= Sekigahara Campaign =

Series of battles in Japan in 1600 CE

- Part of the Sengoku period
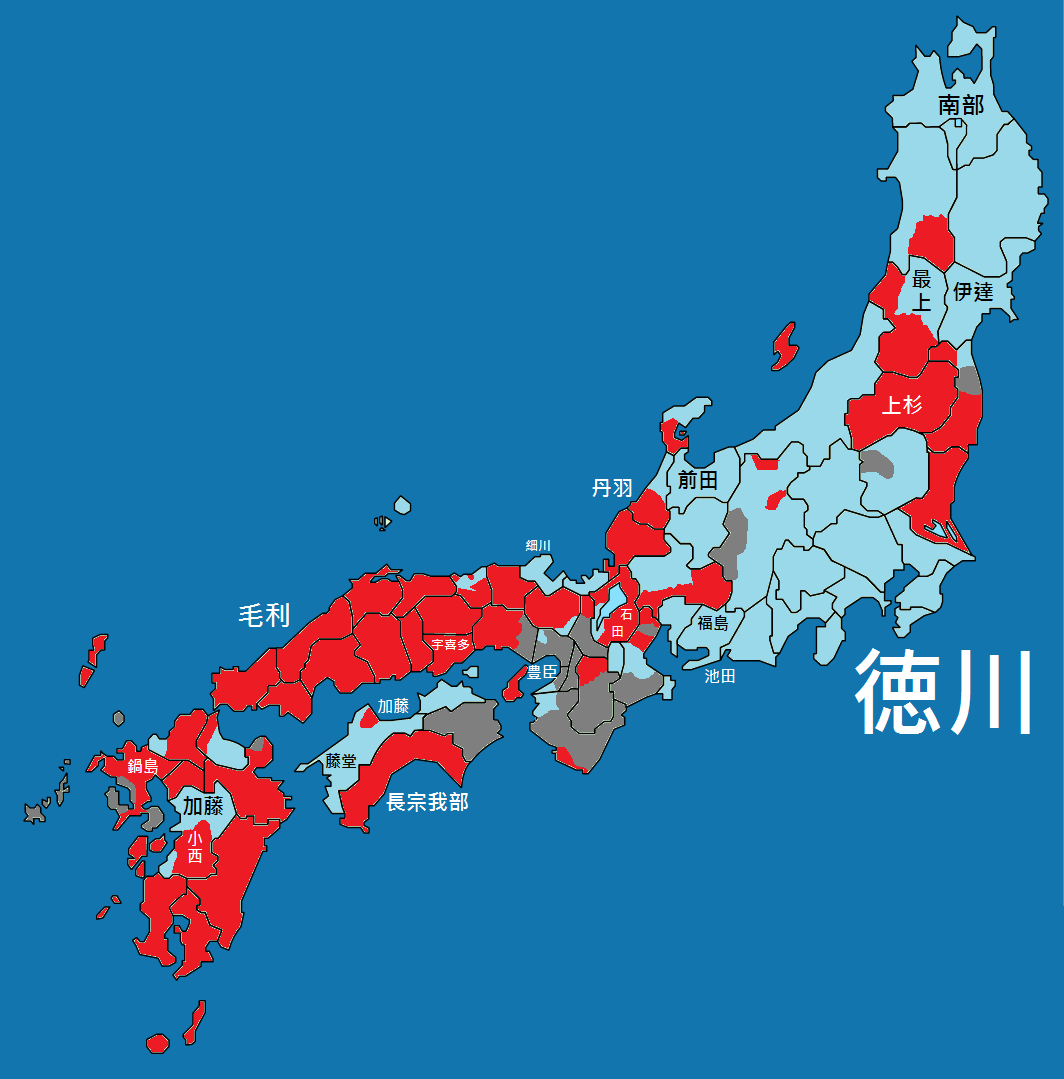
- Map showing the allegiance of major daimyo lords during the conflict. red represents the Western Army, blue represents the Eastern Army, and gray represents neutral forces.
Date	22 August – 5 November 1600; Low-level conflict from 12 July; Continued Date-Uesugi conflict in Tōhoku until May 1601
Location	Japan
Result	Tokugawa victory; beginning of Tokugawa shogunate
Territorial changes	Tokugawa gains nominal control of all Japan

Belligerents
Eastern Army: Forces loyal to Tokugawa Ieyasu: Shinpan (daimyo) clans: Tokugawa clan; Matsudaira clan; Fudai daimyō clans: Ii clan; Sakakibara clan; Sakai clan; Torii clan; Honda clan; Ōkubo clan; Mizuno clan; Tozama daimyō clans; Maeda clan; Mogami clan; Date clan; Kuroda clan; Hosokawa clan; Kyōgoku clan; Sanada clan pro-Eastern faction; Kobayakawa clan (late); Tōdō clan; Asano clan; Ikeda clan; Katō clan; Nabeshima clan; Nanbu clan; Yamauchi clan; Tsutsui clan; Horio clan; Kanamori clan; Hizen-Arima clan	Western Army: Forces loyal to Ishida Mitsunari: Toyotomi clan (Note: While both armies claimed loyalty to the Toyotomi regency, direct Toyotomi retainers were explicitly committed to the Western Army.); Mōri clan; Uesugi clan; Ōtomo clan; Shimazu clan; Chōsokabe clan; Oda clan; Sanada clan pro-Western faction; Kobayakawa clan (defected)

Commanders and leaders
Tokugawa Ieyasu; Tokugawa Hidetada; Tōdō Takatora; Matsudaira Tadayoshi; Fukushima Masanori; Katō Kiyomasa; Honda Tadakatsu; Torii Mototada †; Matsudaira Ietada †; Ōkubo Tadachika; Honda Masanobu; Ii Naomasa (WIA); Katō Yoshiaki; Sakakibara Yasumasa; Sakai Ietsugu; Maeda Toshinaga; Mogami Yoshiaki; Date Masamune; Kuroda Nagamasa; Kuroda Yoshitaka; Ikeda Terumasa; Hosokawa Tadaoki; Hosokawa Fujitaka (surrendered); Mizuno Katsunari; Nabeshima Naoshige; Kyōgoku Takatsugu; Sanada Nobuyuki; Horio Yoshiharu; Asano Nagamasa; Yamauchi Kazutoyo; Kobayakawa Hideaki (late)] Nanbu Toshinao; Tsutsui Sadatsugu; Kanamori Nagachika; Furuta Shigekatsu; Arima Naozumi	Ishida Mitsunari (executed); Ukita Hideie; Shima Sakon †; Ōtani Yoshitsugu †; Toyotomi Hideyori; Mōri Terumoto; Mōri Hidemoto; Konishi Yukinaga (executed); Uesugi Kagekatsu; Naoe Kanetsugu; Maeda Toshimasu; Ōtomo Yoshimune; Tachibana Muneshige; Shimazu Yoshihiro; Shimazu Toyohisa †; Chōsokabe Morichika; Oda Hidenobu (surrendered); Sanada Masayuki; Sanada Yukimura; Kobayakawa Hideaki (defected)

The Sekigahara Campaign was a series of battles in Japan fought between the Eastern Army aligned with Tokugawa Ieyasu and the Western Army loyal to Ishida Mitsunari, culminating in the decisive Battle of Sekigahara. The conflict was sparked by a punitive expedition led by Ieyasu against the Uesugi clan in the northeastern Tōhoku region, providing Mitsunari with an opportunity to denounce Ieyasu in the name of the infant ruling taikō Toyotomi Hideyori while the Tokugawa troops were in the field.

Much of the campaign consisted of a struggle to control key castles on the Tōkaidō and the Nakasendō, the main roads linking Edo and the capital of Kyoto. However, battles and sieges far from these key highways, both in the Tōhoku and in pockets of resistance around the capital, had wide-reaching effects on the manoeuvring and availability of troops for the decisive battle at Sekigahara. The campaign also spilled over briefly into the southern island of Kyūshū, but Ieyasu quickly ordered his forces to stand down following his victory for political reasons.

The campaign dramatically changed the political landscape of Japan, resulting in the ascendancy of the Tokugawa Shogunate over the Toyotomi clan and the shifting of political power between the various daimyō who participated in it.

== Background ==
With the death of Toyotomi Hideyoshi in 1598, his 5 year-old son Toyotomi Hideyori succeeded him formally as the taikō or imperial regent, and rule of Japan fell under a Council of Five Elders appointed by Hideyoshi as regents for Hideyori until he came of age.

Tokugawa Ieyasu, a member of the council, installed himself in Hideyoshi's former residence of Fushimi Castle and arranged political marriages for his children in defiance of the council's restriction on doing so, drawing political ire. Ishida Mitsunari, one of the Five Commissioners appointed to civil administration by Hideyoshi, attempted to approach Maeda Toshiie, a councilman and guardian of Hideyori, at Ōsaka Castle to conspire against Ieyasu; however, the intervention of Hosokawa Tadaoki, a friend of Ieyasu and of the Maeda clan, convinced Toshiie's son Toshinaga to dissuade Toshiie from opposing Ieyasu.

Mitsunari conspired in an assassination plot on Ieyasu, with conflicting narratives on how the plot occurred. By one account, after the plot's failure, several of Ieyasu's generals independently attempted to eliminate Mitsunari. Mitsunari infamously escaped the castle at night disguised as a woman and fled to Fushimi Castle to beg Ieyasu to protect him from retaliation. Ieyasu agreed on the condition that Mitsunari go into exile in his holding at Sawayama Castle in the spring of 1599. Soon after, Maeda Toshiie died in April, and Toshinaga was elected to replace him; however, Ieyasu himself took up guardianship of Hideyori, occupying Ōsaka Castle on 28 October and further enraging the commissioners and council. According to another account, the plot failed when, on 7 September 1599, Ieyasu traveled from Fushimi to Osaka Castle to visit Hideyori and Yodo-dono, mother and daughter, to celebrate the Double Ninth Festival. During this visit, he received a tip-off from Masuda Nagamori, one of the five magistrates, and the plot to assassinate Ieyasu was uncovered. Another collaborator of this plot was revealed to be Maeda Toshinaga, one of the Five Elders, and his accomplices were Hijikata Yuhisa, Ono Harunaga, and Asano Nagamasa, one of the Five Commissioners.Those suspected of being the masterminds of the assassination plot were subsequently severely investigated.

Meanwhile, Tokugawa loyalist Ii Naomasa undertook political initiatives as he formed alliance with Kuroda Yoshitaka and Kuroda Nagamasa. through the Kuroda clan, Naomasa successfully swayed the other military commanders to support the Tokugawa clan. Aside from the Kuroda clan, according to a letter of Naomasa which is preserved in modern-day Hikone Castle Museum, Naomasa also engaged in correspondence with Sanada Nobuyuki to gain his support for the Tokugawa clan in response to a predicted incoming conflict between Ieyasu and his political enemies.

=== Aizu campaign ===
Uesugi Kagekatsu, another councilman, defied Ieyasu by militarising, ordering 80,000 men to construct a castle in Aizu and expand its fortifications and road networks. On 7 May 1600, Ieyasu dispatched a letter to Kagekatsu demanding an explanation, Kagekatsu's chief advisor, Naoe Kanetsugu responded with mocking refusal. Subsequent negotiations broke down, with Kagekatsu even attempting to have one of Ieyasu's envoys killed as a spy, and after Kagekatsu refused to present in person at Ōsaka to account for his actions, Ieyasu summoned a war council on 12 July to plan a punitive expedition, referred to as the "Oyama Council", though some Japanese historians dispute the evidence that this council took place. Regardless, Ieyasu gathered various daimyo lords excluding those from western region to discuss the plan to punish the Uesugi clan.

However, when Ieyasu discovered that Katō Kiyomasa was involved in rebellion of Ijuin Tadamasa against his lord, the Shimazu clan, Ieyasu forbade Kiyomasa from taking part in this campaign. This resulted in Kiyomasa later fighting in the Kyushu campaign against the loyalists of Mitsunari, far from the main battle of Sekigahara.

On 24 July, Ieyasu departed from Ōsaka Castle for his punitive campaign, stopping at Fushimi Castle the next night to give his retainer Torii Mototada instructions against a likely Ishida-backed assault before continuing towards Aizu. Ieyasu was wary of a sudden attack by Mitsunari and his allies, and so he marched at a slow pace to monitor his rivals' movements, arriving in Edo on 10 August where he began mustering troops. Date Masamune and his uncle Mogami Yoshiaki, rulers of Sendai and Yamagata respectively on the border with the Uesugi clan's territory, returned swiftly to their home provinces to defend against Kagekatsu. Mitsunari immediately began summoning conspirators to Sawayama Castle following Ieyasu's departure, some even being convinced to abandon their journeys to join Ieyasu's campaign such as Ōtani Yoshitsugu. On 17 August Mitsunari's war council resolved to form the Western Army as a coalition against Ieyasu, with councilman Mōri Terumoto as its nominal commander-in-chief. According to the letters from Mitsunari to Kagekatsu, it was recorded that Mitsunari also sought cooperation with him to plan a joint attack against Ieyasu's army. However, due to lack of coordination, and alleged mistrust from Kagekatsu, in the end he did not move his troops to pursue Ieyasu's army which were on their way returning to Kyoto as Mitsunari intended.

On 22 August 1600, the coalition entered Ōsaka Castle and proclaimed the creation of the Western Army, claiming guardianship of Hideyori. The same day, Mitsunari issued a series of 13 charges against Ieyasu on behalf of the Five Commissioners and three members of the Council of Five Regents. (Note: Maeda Toshinaga chose to abstain as he had already sided with Ieyasu.) This proclamation effectively marked the declaration of war between the Western and Eastern armies.

== Chūbu-Kansai-Kantō theatre ==
=== Engagements around Kyoto ===
The first major assault of the Western Army in the region of the capital was the siege of Fushimi Castle commencing 27 August. Torii Mototada was resolved to defend the garrison to the last, and despite setbacks the defense held until 6 September when Mototada committed seppuku with his remaining forces, majorly setting back Mitsunari's attempts to support his castles along the Nakasendō road. Nine days later, Mitsunari entered Ōgaki Castle uncontested.

Yamaoka Kagetomo, lord of Kōka samurai clan and ally to Tokugawa Ieyasu, already sent his brother, Kageuchi, to Fushimi Castle, before it was being besieged by the Western Army. Upon learning that the Eastern Army had won the main battle of Sekigahara, Kagetomo headed for Sekigahara from Nagashima in Ise, but encountered Natsuka Masaie's forces along the way. Kagetomo then joined the ither Eastern Army generals Ikeda Nagayoshi and Kamei Tsunenori pursuing the fleeing Natsuka's force. They managed to capture the Minakuchi Castle in Ōmi Province, where the Natsuka clan had taken refuge. After that, Kagetomo telling his allies Kuki Moritaka, Ikeda Nagayuki, and Terazawa Hirotaka that they should also capture Kuwana Castle in Ise Province. The cadlte were defended by two brothers Ujiie Yukihiro and Ujiie Yukitsugu, along with Teranishi Naotsugu. However, as Kagetomo and others arrived, the castle immediately surrendered. Furthermore, this Eastern Army contingent advanced further to force surrenders of Takigawa Katsutoshi in Kanbe Castle and Okamoto Munenori in Kameyama Castle. At the end of thus operation, Ieyasu gave permission to Kagetomo to execute Natsuka Genshun, brother of Masaie who was captured during the capitulation of Minakuchi Castle. Kagetomo did so as vengeance for the Kōka samurai whose wives and children had been crucified by Genshun at Fushimi castle. For his service during the war, Ieyasu also awarded Doami 9,000 koku in Omi Province and the command of 10 cavalrymen and 100 samurai from Kōka.

Though the Western Army had attempted to win over the loyalty of Hosokawa Fujitaka, the father of the Eastern Army general Hosokawa Tadaoki, Mitsunari had alienated Fujitaka during the period following Ieyasu's departure from Ōsaka through an abortive hostage-taking ploy resulting in the death of Tadaoki's wife. Fujitaka had instead fortified Tanabe in Tango Province with 500 men in support of Ieyasu. In mid-August, even prior to the official denouncement of Ieyasu, 15,000 Ishida troops under Onoki Shigekatsu had begun a siege of the fortress. However, Fujitaka's influence and prestige as a scholar-poet was so great that the sympathetic Ishida troops gave a weak offense, such as "forgetting" to load cannons before firing on the keep. The siege only ended 19 October following an order by the emperor to surrender to preserve his life and his precious library, following which the Western Army facilitated his retirement to Kyoto.

Ōtsu Castle on the southwest shore of Lake Biwa, garrisoned by Kyōgoku Takatsugu came under siege on 13 October by the 15,000-strong Western forces of Mōri Motoyasu, Tachibana Muneshige and Tsukushi Hirokado, along with a naval blockade by Mashita Nagamori. The staunch resistance of the Eastern Army troops under Takatsugu was only ended on the 21 October after the Western Army bombarded the castle from Mount Nagara, by which point the Western besiegers, like Onoki Shigekatsu's troops at Tanabe, were too late to join the decisive battle at Sekigahara.

Meanwhile, In Mie Prefecture, Furuta Shigekatsu defended Matsusaka Castle from the incursion of the Western Army.

Meanwhile in the other place, in the Battle of Tsu Castle at October 1, the largest prelude to the Battle of Sekigahara in Ise Province, Kuki Yoshitaka served as a commander of the Western Army naval force. He blockaded the sea and prevented reinforcements from the Eastern Army, contributing to the fall of Tsu Castle. Yoshitaka also received reinforcement from the lord of Shingu Castle in Kii Province who also his son-in-law, Ujiyoshi Horiuchi. Together, they seized Toba Castle, which had been left behind by his son, Kuki Moritaka, who sided with the Eastern Army. However, after the Battle of Sekigahara ended with a victory for the Eastern Army, Yoshitaka fled to Toshima Island. Soon, at the urging of his vassal named Toyoda Goroemon, committed suicide on November 17.

After the main battle of Sekigahara ended, Onogi Shigekatsu retreated from Tanabe Castle, but was soon attacked by an army of 5,300 men led by Hosokawa Tadaoki at Fukuchiyama Castle. Afterwards, he surrendered and opened the castle through the mediation of Yamaoka Doami , who was sent as an emissary of Tokugawa Ieyasu . He begged for mercy through Ii Naomasa, but was denied, so he committed suicide at Jusen-in Temple in Kameyama, Tanba Province.

=== Tōkaidō campaign ===
On 29 August, Ieyasu had established a base of operations in Oyama, and by 1 September Ieyasu began relocating 50,000 troops mustered in Edo north to Oyama, preparing to strike at Kagekatsu in Aizu but not expecting to do so, believing the Date, Mogami and Maeda forces sufficient to halt the Uesugi advance. With the news of the fall of Fushimi, Ieyasu quickly returned to Edo by 10 September, already planning a westward return. Eager to secure the crossroads near Gifu Castle now threatened by the Western Army at Ōgaki Castle, Ieyasu sent Fukushima Masanori, Kuroda Nagamasa, Honda Tadakatsu, Ii Naomasa and Hosokawa Tadaoki ahead along the Tōkaidō road with 16,000 men, followed by 15,000 men under Ikeda Terumasa, Asano Yoshinaga and Yamanouchi Kazutoyo, to fortify Masanori's holding of Kiyosu and to seize Gifu Castle from Oda Hidenobu. The combined 31,000 troops of this "Tōkaidō Corps" quickly besieged Gifu on 28 September and forced the capitulation of Hidenobu.

At first, Mitsunari wanted to use Gifu Castle and Ōgaki Castle as choke points to impede the Eastern army advances. However, several developments of war forced him to abort the plan as:

- Gifu castle was captured by the Eastern Army under Fukushima Masanori and Ii Naomasa before the main forces of Western Army arrived,
- On September 13, Shimazu Yoshihiro was defeated by Mizuno Katsunari in the battle of Sone Castle, following which Katsunari burned the outer moat of Ōgaki Castle and forced Shimazu Yoshihiro to retreat into Ise Province. (Note: The memorandum of Ōshige Heiroku about the Sekigahara campaign theorized that the castle had still not fallen at that moment, but that Yoshihiro saw the smoke rising from Ōgaki Castle and believed the castle already fallen.)

This forced Mitsunari to prepare for the open engagement on the field of Sekigahara.

Meanwhile in Ōsaka, Mōri clan retainer Kikkawa Hiroie was enraged by Mitsunari confining Mōri Terumoto, nominal commander-in-chief of the Western Army, to the castle, and in response to the insult Hiroie secretly communicated with the Tōkaidō Corps promising to keep the 36,000 Mōri troops from engaging the Eastern Army. Mōri Hidemoto, Terumoto's cousin and deputy, also urged Terumoto to defect to the Eastern Army before any engagement occurred.

On 29 September, the Tōkaidō Corps occupied the highlands of Akasaka to threaten Ōgaki Castle as Nabeshima Naoshige besieged the Eastern Army stronghold of Matsuoka Castle. The following day, 30,000 Western troops under Mori Hidemoto, Chōsokabe Morichika, and Nabeshima Katsushige besieged An'nōzu Castle, held by Fukuda Nobutaka and his 1,700-strong garrison. Ishida Mitsunari left Ōgaki Castle on 1 October for Sawayama Castle, where he relented and summoned Mōri Terumoto, who had returned to his own domain to raise troops, to return; one messenger was intercepted, and though a second messenger succeeded in prompting Terumoto to depart with his 30,000 troops, they were delayed from reaching the major confrontations.

Ieyasu moved quickly towards the capital region, reaching Shimada in Suruga Province on 12 October and Nakaizumi in Totomi Province the following day. At the same time, Mōri Hidemoto and Kikkawa Hiroie entered Mino Province and fortified Mount Nangu. During this march, Ieyasu received a letter from Western Army commander Kobayakawa Hideaki offering to defect to the Eastern Army. On 17 October Ieyasu reached Kiyosu Castle, intending to bypass Ōgaki entirely to threaten Sawayama Castle or Ōsaka, and 2 days later he had arrived at Gifu Castle.

Ieyasu arrived in Akasaka around noon on 20 October, meeting up with the main body of the Tōkaidō Corps, and encamped on the hill at Okayama. Western Army generals convinced Mitsunari to permit a testing raid, and Shima Sakon and Akashi Masataka led a small force to attack the Eastern Army at the Kuisegawa river near Ōgaki, mauling the Eastern Army and forcing them to retreat to Sekigahara to regroup. That night, Shimazu Yoshihiro with Ukita Hideie's support suggested a night assault on the exhausted Eastern Army troops, but was opposed by Shima Sakon who convinced Mitsunari to decline the proposal, insulting Yoshihiro. Mitsunari instead ordered a general withdrawal in the evening to the valley of Sekigahara after learning of Kobayakawa Hideaki's occupation of Mount Matsuo, emptying Ōgaki Castle of most of its garrison.

Kikkawa Hiroie, who had predicted that the Western Army would lose, negotiated through Kuroda Nagamasa for the relief of the Mori clan's territories on the condition that the Mori forces would not participate in the main battle.

On 21 October, the Western Army arrayed itself in the valley with Mitsunari's headquarters at the foot of Mount Sasao facing the Eastern Army, while Mōri Hidemoto led a separate formation at the Eastern Army's left flank at the foot of Mount Nangu. Historian Andō Yūichirō estimated that the battle in Sekigahara took place in its entirety over a mere two hours – from 10:00 to 12:00 – contrary to the Edo-period accepted theory of the battle lasting twice as long. The subsequent battle of Sekigahara saw a decisive defeat for the Western Army, with Mitsunari's contingent annihilated by Kobayakawa Hideaki defecting to the Eastern Army and rolling down the formation's right flank, while after a smaller engagement and the treachery of Kikkawa Hiroie forced the eastern formation under Mōri Hidemoto to withdraw rather than join battle.

From 21 to 30 October, Ōgaki Castle was subsequently besieged and taken by the Eastern Army, while on 22 October Kobayakawa Hideaki began besieging Sawayama, ostensibly as a sign of penance and loyalty to Ieyasu; Ishida Masazumi, Mitsunari's brother and commander at Sawayama, capitulated and committed suicide on the second day of the siege. Ishida Mitsunari and Ankokuji Ekei were captured fleeing north from Sekigahara, and were subsequently executed in Kyoto on 9 November.

Meanwhile, the Gujō Hachiman Castle also contested between the forces of Inaba Sadamichi and Endo Tanenao, who Supported The Western Army, with the forces of Endo Yoshitaka and Kanamori Yoshishige, who supported the Eastern army. After the Eastern Army won the Battle of Sekigahara, Sadamichi was transferred by Ieyasu to the Usuki Domain in Bungo Province with a fief of 50,000 koku, and Yoshitaka received Yawata Castle in early November and took over Nakayama Castle.

=== Nakasendō campaign ===
On 25 August, Ōtani Yoshitsugu had made contact with the Sanada clan at Ueda Castle and recruited Sanada Masayuki and his son Yukimura; the eldest son, Sanada Nobuyuki, had already been sent by Masayuki to join the Tokugawa, with whom he already had marriage ties through his wife Komatsuhime (Note: Komatsuhime was Tokugawa retainer Honda Tadakatsu's daughter.) in an attempt to preserve the Sanada clan. After dispatching the Tōkaidō Corps, Ieyasu sent his son Tokugawa Hidetada along the Nakasendō road with 36,000 men towards Mino, ordering him to threaten Ueda Castle while continuing on to meet the Tōkaidō Corps. He reached Karuizawa on 7 October and subsequently arrived in Komoro on 12 October; however, there he disobeyed his father's orders and instead marched on Ueda, encaping at Sometani. Komatsuhime herself had brief but bloodless confrontation at Numata Castle with Masayuki and Yukimura before the siege of Ueda began in earnest.

Hidetada, being unexperienced in warfare at 21 years old, besieged Ueda Castle and its commander Sanada Masayuki unsuccessfully until 16 October, at which point he realised his delay and broke the siege to continue westward along the Nakasendō. He would still, however, only rendezvous with his disappointed father's forces late in the day on 21 October, after the Battle of Sekigahara had been fought and decided.

=== Situation in Kantō ===
Yūki Hideyasu was ordered by Ieyasu to remain in his holdings in Shimōsa, possibly because of his pro-Toyotomi sympathies, and possibility because his emergence as a strong military leader might threaten the prestige and position of his younger half-brother, Tokugawa Hidetada. Following the Battle of Sekigahara and the establishment of the Tokugawa shogunate, he was given all of Echizen Province (670,000 koku) as his fief. In 1604, he was allowed to take the surname Matsudaira.

The Satomi clan under Satomi Yoshiyasu sided with the Eastern Army and defended Utsunomiya Castle. After the war, he was recognized for his achievements by being awarded 30,000 koku in Kashima County, Hitachi Province, making him a daimyo with a total fief of 122,000 koku. Yoshiyasu's younger brother, Satomi Tadashige, was also appointed daimyo of Itahana Domain in Kozuke Province with a fief of 10,000 koku.

== Tōhoku theatre ==
Uesugi Kagekatsu's uprising began in earnest even before the Western Army's proclamation, but Date Masamune and Mogami Yoshiaki began responding to hostilities even before the declaration of war. The Satake clan of Kubota Domain declared neutrality in the conflict due to a secret treaty with the Uesugi and the divided sympathies of clan head Satake Yoshinobu. Maeda Toshinaga also declared for the Tokugawa, but was initially blocked from supporting the campaign due to an internal conflict with the pro-Western faction within the Maeda clan led by his brother Toshimasa in Noto Province. Toshinaga eventually laid siege to Daishōji Castle on 7 September, prompting the suicide of the garrison commander and Toshimasa's capitulation.

=== Keichō Dewa Campaign ===
The northern campaign in and around Dewa province, known as the Keichō Dewa Campaign, was the key flashpoint providing the casus belli for the Sekigahara Campaign at large, and largely consisted of actions by the Uesugi clan against the combined forces of Mogami Yoshiaki and Date Masamune in an unsuccessful attempt to draw Ieyasu's troops northward from Edo.

In the course of responding to the Uesugi clan's mobilisation prior to the declaration of war, Date Masamune seized Shiroishi Castle south of Sendai from the Western Army-aligned Uesugi army in a short siege from the 18–19 August. Masamune's 20,000 troops under Katakura Kagetsuna, Oniniwa Tsunamoto and Yashiro Kageyori attacked Matsukawa, defended by 6,000 defenders under Honjo Shigenaga and Suda Nagayoshi, on October 6, but were repelled.

Uesugi Kagekatsu nominated Naoe Kanetsugu to lead the campaign against the Date and Mogami. The three-division invasion of Mogami territory was launched on 14 October with the aims of taking Yamagata Castle, the 10,000-strong headquarters of Mogami Yoshiaki. Kanetsugu advanced from Yonezawa on 14 October with 20,000 troops of the first division westward towards Yamagata Castle; en route, the Uesugi army besieged Hataya Castle on 18 October, where the garrison of 300 led by Eguchi Gohei fell defending it to the last man. Simultaneously, the 4,000-strong second division under Honmura Chikamori and Yokota Munetoshi besieged Kaminoyama Castle south of Yamagata, held by the Mogami retainer Satomi Minbu; the Uesugi forces conquered it but suffered setbacks thanks to a Mogami counterattack, losing Chikamori in battle and delaying the second division's approach towards Yamagata. The third division, comprising 3,000 men under Shida Yoshihide and Shimo Yoshitada, also advanced towards Yonegawa from the north via Shōnai.

Kanetsugu arrived at Hasedō Castle on 21 October, the day of the Battle of Sekigahara, commencing the Siege of Hasedō. During the course of the siege, Date Masamune and Rusu Masakage crossed the mountain passes to encamp 2.5 km east of Yamagata on 24 October, and Rusu Masakage led an attempt to relieve the siege, prompting Kanetsugu to attempt to storm Hasedō; the assault was repelled, and Kanetsugu retreated leaving a holding force to threaten Hasedō. On November 5, news finally reached Kanetsugu of the defeat at Sekigahara and orders were given to lift the siege entirely, withdrawing the skeleton force to Yonezawa. Date Masamune capitalised on this withdrawal by attempting to besiege Fukushima Castle on 12 November, but withdrew when Uesugi Kagekatsu led a force to relieve the defenders. The Uesugi conflict with the Date and Mogami would outlast the Sekigahara Campaign proper, with a subsequent abortive attempt by Date Masamune to take Fukushima Castle defeated in battle at Matsukawa on 28 May 1601.

== Shikoku theater ==
In early August, under the direction of Hiroshima's caretaker, Motoyoshi Sase, Murakami Motoyoshi was recalled from Awa, and preparations for a military invasion were underway, led by his father, Murakami Takeyoshi, and Sone Kagefusa.

On September 10, the Iyo invasion force departed Hiroshima and reached Ogoshima Island off the coast of Matsumae on the 14th.

On the night of September 17, while the Mori forces were camping at Mitsuhama, they were ambushed by the Katō clan forces, and Murakami Takeyoshi and Sone Kagefusa were killed in the battle.

On September 19, following the defeat of the Western Army at Sekigahara, Terumoto ordered the Mori forces Awa, Tokushima, to retreat to Osaka. Following this order, on the 25th of the same month, the Mori forces handed over Tokushima Castle and its castle town to Masuda Hikoshirō, a vassal of the Hachisuka clan.

== Kyūshū theatre ==
On the April 26, news of the Aizu campaign reached the area, and Tadaoki hurriedly set off east. On August 28, Kato Kiyomasa informed Kitsuki Castle of Otomo Yoshimune's arrival in Bungo, and preparations for battle began. A messenger was dispatched to Tadaoki. Tadaoki's chief retainer, Matsui Yasuyuki , was stationed at Kitsuki Castle, but he refused repeated requests from Toyotomi magistrates and Otani Yoshitsugu to join the Western Army. On August 4, Terumoto and Ukita Hideie issued a letter ordering him to surrender, and dispatched Kazunari , the son of Ota Kazuyoshi , lord of Usuki Castle . However, Yasuyuki, who was in charge of the area, refused their order. On the night of September 10, the Otomo forces, led by Yoshihiro Muneyuki and led by Kibe Gentatsu, Yoshihiro Shichizaemon, gunner Shibata Muneo, and 100 other soldiers, set out from Tateishi to attack Kitsuki Castle. Thanks to a secret betrayal by Nohara Tarouemon in the Ninomaru, the castle town was set on fire, and the battle began at dawn. On the Kitsuki Castle side, Yasuyuki set up an ambush on Mt. Aihara to intercept the attack, killing Shibata Muneo and resulting in a defeat for the Otomo forces. The battle also saw the destruction of Shuyuin Chosenji Temple, Entsuzan Kannon Zen Temple, and Taiheizan Hosenji Temple.

In the run-up to hostilities, Nabeshima Naoshige of Saga Domain intended to support the Tokugawa; however, his son Katsushige was present at Mitsunari's war council on 17 August and swayed him towards joining the Western Army.

Later, On the September 13, the Kitsuki forces set out and took up positions on Mt. Jissouji, and the first sonae of the Kuroda army's advance guard passed through the path between Mt. Jissouji and Mt. Kakudono and clashed with the Otomo forces stationed at Ishigakihara.

Katō Kiyomasa quickly began a campaign in Kyūshū to besiege the holdings of Konishi Yukinaga, a Mōri vassal and rival of Kiyomasa's who had fought under the Western Army at Sekigahara and fled into hiding following the battle. Kuroda Yoshitaka also separately marched on Ōtomo Yoshitsugu's territory, taking Ishitatewara Castle easily on 19 October.

The daimyo of Shimabara Domain Arima Harunobu participated of the army and attacked Konishi Yukinaga's Uto Castle together with Katō Kiyomasa. Harunobu was unable to march due to an eye problem, so he sent his son, Arima Naozumi marched in his place.

Kiyomasa besieged Udo Castle before meeting up with Kuroda Yoshitaka, who had already conquered several minor locations on Kyūshū, and Nabeshima Katsushige, whose family had defected to the Tokugawa. The two then began the siege of Yanagawa in Chikugo Province, defended by Tachibana Muneshige and Tachibana Ginchiyo. The Tachibana troops continued to hold out in the castle, with Ginchiyo organising an ad-hoc militia of nuns to slow the advance of the Eastern Army, donning armour herself to serve as Muneshige's rearguard. Muneshige eventually surrendered the castle following the suggestion that he defect to the Eastern Army in order to attack the Shimazu clan, their long-time rivals; however, Ieyasu instituted a plan of appeasement for the Shimazu to prevent unrest following their defeat at Sekigahara, and so forbade any further action against them.

== Bibliography ==
- Bryant, Anthony (1995). Sekigahara 1600: The Final Struggle For Power. Osprey Campaign Series. Vol. 40. Oxford: Osprey Publishing. ISBN 978-1-85532-395-7.
- Davis, Paul (1999). "Sekigahara, 21 October 1600". 100 Decisive Battles: From Ancient Times to the Present. Oxford University Press. ISBN 978-0-19-514366-9.
- Turnbull, Stephen (2000) [first published 1998]. The Samurai Sourcebook. London: Cassel & Co. ISBN 978-1-85409-523-7.
- Mitsunari, Junji (2016). 毛利輝元 ―西国の儀任せ置かるの由候― [Mōri Terumoto: Saigoku no gi makase okaru no yoshi sōrō]. ミネルヴァ日本評伝選 (in Japanese). ミネルヴァ書房.
- Turnbull, Stephen (2002). War in Japan 1467-1615. Osprey Essential Histories. Vol. 46. Oxford: Osprey Publishing. ISBN 978-1-84176-480-1.
