= Kutsuki =

Kutsuki (written: 朽木) is a Japanese surname. Notable people with the surname include:

- Kutsuki Harutsuna (朽木 晴綱, 1518–1550), Japanese samurai
- Kutsuki Masatsuna (朽木 昌綱, 1750–1802), Japanese daimyō
- Kutsuki Mototsuna (朽木 元綱, 1549–1632), Japanese samurai

== See also ==
- Kutsuki, Shiga (朽木村, Kutsuki-mura), former village in Shiga Prefecture, Japan
