= Battle of Kuisegawa =

- Part of the Sengoku period
Date	1600
Location	Ogaki Castle, near the Kuisegawa river 35°23′20″N 136°34′34″E
Result	Western Army victory and Eastern Army retreats to Sekigahara

Belligerents
Western Army (Ishida Mitsunari)	Eastern Army (Tokugawa Ieyasu)

Commanders and leaders
Shima Sakon; Akashi Teruzumi	Arima Toyouji; Nakamura Kazuhide; Noisshiki Sukeyoshi †; Honda Tadakatsu

Strength
1,300	6,000

Casualties and losses
less	Noisshiki Sukeyoshi †; Nakamura Kazuhide (wounds); Arima Toyouji (wounds); 4,000 men
- Location within Japan

The Battle of Kuisegawa (杭瀬川の戦い) was a decisive battle during the Sekigahara Campaign, this battle gave Ishida Mitsunari's Western Army the initial advantage at the Battle of Sekigahara while Tokugawa Ieyasu's Eastern Army suffered heavy losses and had to retreat to Sekigahara.

== Beginning ==
A few days before October 21, 1600, Ishida Mitsunari and his troops were stationed at Ōgaki Castle. They were evaluating their situation when Tokugawa's army arrived two days later at Mino Akasaka, a few miles away from their location. Seeing the massive army before them, many of the Western army soldiers began to quiver with fear.

== The battle ==
One man who wasn't afraid was Shima Sakon. Wanting to restore the spirit of the men, he requested permission to lead a handful of men to test the enemy's skill. His request was wearily granted and he rode out with 500 men to the Kuisegawa river dividing the two armies, Kuisegawa. Akashi Teruzumi, who had at least 800 men, supported him by waiting in ambush. Hiding his troops in the nearby thicket, Sakon attacked the nearest general, Nakamura Kazuhide. Lured by the offense, Kazuhide and his closest allies, Arima Toyouji and Noisshiki Sukeyoshi, followed the retreating Sakon. As they pursued him, they were ambushed and fought blindly in the forest until Sukeyoshi was killed by Sakon's troops.

Honda Tadakatsu, who was notified of the ruckus, immediately rode to Kuisegawa to assist his comrades' retreat, when he arrived there, he ordered the wounded Toyouji and Kazuhide to retreat while he would attack the Western Army's camp and create a distraction. As the struggle at the Western Army's camp went on, with Sakon and Akashi battling Tadakatsu, it was over as soon as Toyouji and Kazuhide were able to get away from Kuisegawa, Tadakatsu also fought his way out.

Although Arima and Kazuhide successfully retreated thanks to Tadakatsu's aid, the Eastern Army suffered significant losses from the battle and had to pull back from the Mino Akasaka territory, while Sakon and Teruzumi triumphantly returned to Mitsunari and their army's morale was restored. Based on his experience on the field, Sakon advised to move the battle to Sekigahara. Tokugawa Ieyasu was watching the battle from a castle where he was residing and was rather impressed by the Western Army's performance in it.

== Aftermath ==
The Western Army was victorious in this battle, and thanks to it, their morale was boosted and they held a numerical advantage over the Eastern Army in the greater battle yet to come. Though there were losses on both sides, the Western Army's losses were minimal and the Eastern Army had one officer killed, 4.000 men killed and lost territory. The unit with the highest reported casualties was Sukeyoshi who lost 2,000 men in the assault and has been slain. Not wanting to lose the advantage, Mitsunari ordered his army to surround Ieyasu at Sekigahara where the greatest battle in the history of Japan was to take place.

Today, Ōgaki Castle is a museum for Sekigahara and is considered a national treasure in Japan.
