= Akaza Naoyasu =

Japanese daimyo

- 赤座 直保
- Died: 1606; Daimon river, Etchū Province
- Relatives: Akaza Naonori (father)
- Military career
- Allegiance: Oda clan Toyotomi clan Maeda clan
- Rank: Daimyo
- Nickname: 'Kyūbei' or 'Yoshiie'
- Conflicts: Siege of Iwatsuki (1590); Siege of Oshi (1590); Battle of Sekigahara (1600)

Akaza Naoyasu (赤座 直保; ? – 1606) was a Japanese daimyō of the Azuchi–Momoyama period, who served Toyotomi Hideyoshi. He was also known as Kyūbei (久兵衛) and Yoshiie (吉家), and held the title of Bingo-no-kami (備後守).

== Biography ==
His father, Akaza Naonori (赤座 直則), was a retainer of Oda Nobunaga. Naonori was killed in action when Akechi Mitsuhide attacked and killed Nobunaga at Honnō-ji in 1582 (Incident at Honnōji). Naoyasu then served Toyotomi Hideyoshi.

In 1590, he took part in capturing Iwatsuki Castle and Oshi Castle at Musashi Province in the Odawara campaign, and was given 20,000 koku. After that, based in Imajo, Echizen Province, he supported Kobayakawa Hideaki and Horio Yoshiharu.

In 1600 at the Battle of Sekigahara, he was under Ōtani Yoshitsugu, who led part of Ishida Mitsunari's force. However, taking advantage of Kobayakawa Hideaki's betrayal, he switched sides with Wakisaka Yasuharu, Kutsuki Mototsuna, and Ogawa Suketada. Together, they defeated Yoshitsugu's force. After the battle, Tokugawa Ieyasu did not give Naoyasu credit and seized his domain. Because of that, Naoyasu became a retainer of Maeda Toshinaga, and was given a stipend of 7,000 koku.

== Death ==
In 1606, looking over flooded Daimon River, in Etchū Province, he fell off a horse and died by drowning. Naoyasu was succeeded by his son, Akaza Takaharu (赤座孝治). Takaharu changed his family name to Nagahara (永原), and became a retainer of the Maeda clan of Kaga. The family remained retainers of the Maeda until the Meiji Restoration.
