= Battle of Sekigahara =

1600 battle in Japan

- Part of the Sekigahara Campaign during the Sengoku period
- Edo-period screen depicting the battle
Date	October 21, 1600
Location	Sekigahara / Aonogahara (Note: The Mikawa Monogatari chronicle has recorded that according to the letter of Konoe Motohisa which dated September 1600, the battle was taking place Aonogahara (Aono plain). Similarly, The Chronicles of Toshogu Shrine also stated Aonogahara as the place of the battle. In addition, in a letter by Kikkawa Hiroie and a kyoka poem also mention Aonogahara as the place which the battle occurred.) Mino Province, present-day Gifu Prefecture, Japan 35.3705°N 136.4616°E
Result	Eastern army victory
Territorial changes	Tokugawa clan gains nominal control of all Japan

Belligerents
Western Army: Forces loyal to Ishida Mitsunari	Eastern Army: Forces loyal to Tokugawa Ieyasu

Commanders and leaders
Ishida Mitsunari (executed); Ukita Hideie; Ōtani Yoshitsugu †; Shima Sakon †; Chōsokabe Morichika; Gamō Yorisato †; Shimazu Yoshihiro; Shimazu Toyohisa †; Akashi Takenori; Konishi Yukinaga (executed); Toda Katsushige †; Ankokuji Ekei (executed); Mōri Hidemoto; Natsuka Masaie †; Hiratsuka Tamehiro; Defected: Kobayakawa Hideaki; Kikkawa Hiroie; Wakisaka Yasuharu; Kutsuki Mototsuna; Akaza Naoyasu; Ogawa Suketada	Tokugawa Ieyasu: Overall commander Ii Naomasa: Supreme field commander Fukushima Masanori; Tōdō Takatora; Hosokawa Tadaoki; Ikeda Terumasa; Oda Urakusai; Matsudaira Tadayoshi; Kuroda Nagamasa; Takenaka Shigekado; Honda Tadakatsu; Katō Yoshiaki; Terazawa Hirotaka; Ikoma Kazumasa; Tsutsui Sadatsugu; Horio Tadauji; Kanamori Nagachika; Asano Yoshinaga; Yamauchi Kazutoyo; Kyōgoku Takatomo; Furuta Oribe (Note: often mistaken for Furuta Shigekatsu, who was participated in other battle, by Edo-Meiji period history records.)

Strength
120,000 initially, 81,890 by the time of battle	75,000 initially, 88,888 by the time of battle

Casualties and losses
Sekigahara Gunki Taisei: 8,000–32,000 killed; Tokugawa Jikki; The Chronicles of Toshogu Shrine: 35,270 killed; Choyakyubun Hokou:30,000-35,270 (heads collected by the Eastern army after the battle); ~23,000 defected	Sekigahara Gunki Taisei: 4,000–10,000 killed; Tokugawa Jikki; The Chronicles of Toshogu Shrine: 8,000 killed
- Location within Gifu Prefecture Battle of Sekigahara (Japan)

The Battle of Sekigahara (Shinjitai: 関ヶ原の戦い; Kyūjitai: 關ヶ原の戰い, Hepburn romanization: Sekigahara no Tatakai) was an important battle in Japan which occurred on October 21, 1600 (Keichō 5, 15th day of the 9th month) in what is now Gifu Prefecture, Japan, at the end of the Sengoku period.

This battle was fought by the forces of Tokugawa Ieyasu against a coalition loyal to the Toyotomi clan, led by Ishida Mitsunari on behalf of the young child Toyotomi Hideyori, from which several commanders defected before or during the battle, leading to a Tokugawa victory. The Battle of Sekigahara is often regarded as the most important battle in Japanese history.

Mitsunari's defeat in the Battle of Sekigahara is generally considered to be the beginning point of the Tokugawa shogunate, which ruled Japan for two and a half centuries until 1868.

== Background ==
The final years of Toyotomi Hideyoshi's reign were turbulent. At the time of Hideyoshi's death, his heir, Toyotomi Hideyori, was only 5 years old, causing a power vacuum in Japan.

=== Feuding factions ===
In the years following the Imjin War and the death of Hideyoshi, factional disputes arose between Ishida Mitsunari and seven former Toyotomi generals including Katō Kiyomasa. After the subsequent death of Maeda Toshiie, a powerful and long-term ally of Hideyoshi and Oda Nobunaga, who had been sympathetic to Mitsunari's posturing, the uneasy balance of power began to dissolve. Tokugawa Ieyasu gathered both Kiyomasa and Fukushima Masanori to his cause in a bid to challenge the opposition from Mitsunari, who claimed to fight on behalf of the Toyotomi clan.

At this time, political tensions were high in the capital. In 1599, when the relationship between Ieyasu and Maeda Toshiie became strained and rumors of an attempted conspiracy to storm the Tokugawa residence spread, Yoshitsugu accompanied Fukushima Masanori and other military commanders of the Toyotomi clan to the Tokugawa residence to guard Ieyasu. Later, when rumors of a plot to assassinate Ieyasu by Maeda Toshinaga emerged, Yoshitsugu led an army to Echizen with the inner circle of Ishida Mitsunari, who had been ousted by Ieyasu. Maeda Toshinaga, who was accused of being involved in such conspiracies and contentiously but peacefully made to marry into the Tokugawa clan. Uesugi Kagekatsu, one of Hideyori's regents, stood against Ieyasu by building up his army, which Ieyasu officially questioned, demanding answers from Kyoto about Kagekatsu's suspicious activity. Naoe Kanetsugu responded with a mocking letter highlighting Ieyasu's own violations of Hideyoshi's orders.

Mitsunari met with Ōtani Yoshitsugu, Mashita Nagamori and Ankokuji Ekei, conspiring to raise an anti-Tokugawa army, of which Mōri Terumoto was appointed to be the overall commander. This coalition formed what came to be referred to as the Western Army. Terumoto immediately marched and captured Osaka Castle while the main army of the Tokugawa were still on their way to suppress Kagekatsu.

At first, Mitsunari wanted to use Gifu Castle, which at that time was commanded by Oda Hidenobu (the grandson of Nobunaga), and Ōgaki Castle as choke points to impede the advances of the Eastern Army (the Tokugawa-led coalition). However, this plan was foiled by a number of campaign events:

- Gifu Castle was captured by the Eastern Army under Fukushima Masanori and Ii Naomasa before the main forces of the Western Army arrived.
- On October 19, Shimazu Yoshihiro's troops were beaten by Mizuno Katsunari in a battle outside Sone Castle, and breaking through two or three baileys, after which Katsunari razed the outer moat of Ōgaki Castle and forced Yoshihiro to retreat into Ise Province. (Note: the memorandum about Sekigahara campaign has theorized that the castle was still not fallen at that moment. However, Yoshihiro saw the smoke soared high from the direction of Ōgaki castle and though the castle was already fallen, as Yoshihiro position at that moment were far from Ogaki castle after being beaten by Katsunari's forces before.)
- Mitsunari realized that the Tokugawa army was heading towards Osaka Castle.

Following these failures and the threat against Osaka Castle, Mitsunari changed his plan and prepared his army for an open battle on the field of Sekigahara against the main body of the Eastern Army, led by Ieyasu. As preparation for this inevitable conflict, Ieyasu had purchased massive quantities of Tanegashima matchlocks.

However, one day before the beginning of the battle, Kikkawa Hiroie, vassal of the Western Army-allied Mōri clan, colluded with the Eastern Army and promised that the Mōri clan would change sides during the battle, on the condition they would be pardoned after the war. Kuroda Yoshitaka and Kuroda Nagamasa served as representatives of the Eastern Army in this correspondence with Hiroie. Hiroie and his senior retainer Fukubara Hirotoshi presented hostages to the Tokugawa side as proof for their cooperation with the latter.

== Battle ==
At dawn on October 21, 1600, the Tokugawa advance guard stumbled into Ishida's army; neither side saw each other because of dense fog caused by earlier rains. Both sides panicked and withdrew, but each was now aware of their adversary's presence and location. Mitsunari placed his position in defensive formation, while Ieyasu deployed his forces south of the Western Army position. Last-minute orders were issued and the battle began. Traditional opinion has stated the battle began around 08:00. However, recent Japanese historians' research estimates that the battle actually began closer to 10:00. (Note: Primary source material from a letter signed by Ishikawa Yasumichi and Motomasa Hikosaka to Matsudaira Ienori which informing the battle started at 10:00 am.)

The battlefield's topography, a narrow basin flanked by Mount Nangu to the south and Mount Matsuo to the north, constrained large-scale maneuvers. Military historian Stephen Turnbull notes that this geography forced the Western Army into a linear formation, limiting their ability to utilize their numerical advantage effectively, while providing elevated positions that defectors later used to enfilade the Western lines.

The battle started when Ii Naomasa, previously heavily involved in the Battle of Gifu Castle, commanded his famed unit of 3,600 crimson-clad Ii no Akazonae ("Ii's red devils") to attack the center of the Western Army. According to historian Watanabe Daimon, by many indications of the battle records, the assignment of Naomasa as ichiban-yari (the first unit to engage the enemy) suggests the armies may have already been settled before the battle. Fukushima Masanori concurred with Naomasa's intention to lead the first attack, as Naomasa was appointed by Ieyasu as the supreme field commander and was therefore responsible for all commands and strategies during the battle. (Note: If the theory was true, Professor Watanabe Daimon surmised that this means Ii Naomasa acted as both supreme commander and the Ichiban-Yari unit (vanguard unit which was expected to draw first blood in medieval Japanese warfare).)

Naomasa charged forward with 30 spearmen and clashed with the ranks of the Western Army. Meanwhile, Fukushima Masanori advanced from his position, following Naomasa and immediately engaging with troops led by Ukita Hideie.

At this point, the battle entered a deadlock. Ōta Gyūichi, who was present at the battle, wrote in his chronicle that "friends and foes are pushing each other" and "gunfire thunders while hails of arrows fly in the sky". According to records from Spanish accounts, 19 cannons from the De Liefde, a Dutch trading ship, were also used by the Tokugawa army in this battle as field artillery. Kani Saizō, the forerunner of Fukushima Masanori's army, was recorded for taking the heads of 17 enemy combatants he killed during combat near Gifu Castle, and was noted by Ieyasu himself with praise after the battle concluded Famous swordsman Yagyū Munenori also reported being participated on the side of Eastern Army, where he was later given 2,000 koku in Yamato Province as recognition for his merit in this battle.

=== Western Army defectors ===
During the Battle of Sekigahara, several commanders of the Western Army changed sides, allying with the Tokugawa and changing the course of the battle. Perhaps the most notable of these defectors was Kobayakawa Hideaki, the nephew of Toyotomi Hideyoshi, whose disgruntlement with his uncle was exploited by the Tokugawa to sway his loyalty. Two prevailing theories exist regarding the timeline of Hideaki's defection:

- The conventional theory regarding Hideaki's betrayal suggests that the defection occurred partway through the battle. Although he had agreed to defect to the Tokugawa side beforehand, Hideaki was allegedly hesitant during the battle and remained neutral, reportedly only joining the battle around noon as a member of the Eastern Army. Some later historical accounts claim that as the battle grew more intense, Ieyasu finally ordered his arquebuses to fire at Kobayakawa's position on Mt. Matsuo to force a choice. This version allegedly originated from an anecdote about Hideaki dating to the Edo period.
- Modern Japanese researchers of Sekigahara, such as Jun Shiramine and Junji Mitsunari, have advanced the theory that Hideaki had already defected to the side of Tokugawa by the start of the battle, based on correspondence documents between Hideaki and Kuroda Nagamasa before the battle, as well as Ōtani Yoshitsugu's army position at the start of the battle suggesting foreknowledge by the Western Army of Hideaki's betrayal. Historian Stephen Turnbull also argues that the sheer distance between the Eastern Army positions and that of Kobayakawa, far out of range of arquebuses and likely too far for a shot to even be heard, makes the "story about Ieyasu ordering ‘cannon-shot’ into his ranks" to force Hideaki's hand very unlikely. Furthermore, Masayuki Fujimoto argues the notion of Ieyasu' shooting cannot be corroborated by reliable historical sources of that time. Similarly, another historian, Yūichi Goza explains that the story of Ieyasu shooting at Hideaki's location comes from secondary sources from the Edo period, suggesting it may have been the result of dramatization and embellishment from pro-Tokugawa shogunate historiography to aggrandize Ieyasu's success in Sekigahara. In fact, Goza explained that according to the theory of Jun Shiramine and other Japanese historian Takahashi Yōsuke, the reason why Mitsunari moved from Ogaki Castle to Sekigahara was not because they were enticed to confront the Eastern Army there, but because Mitsunari had learned Hideaki's betrayal even before the battle, and he wanted to rescue Otani Yoshitsugu, who was already arrived at Sekigahara.

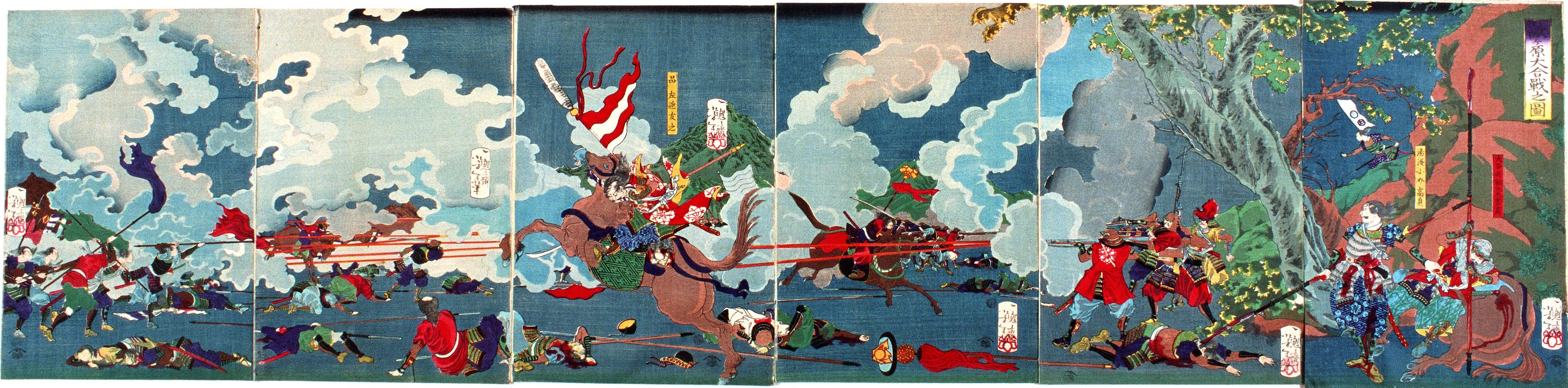
Sekigahara battle woodblockprint

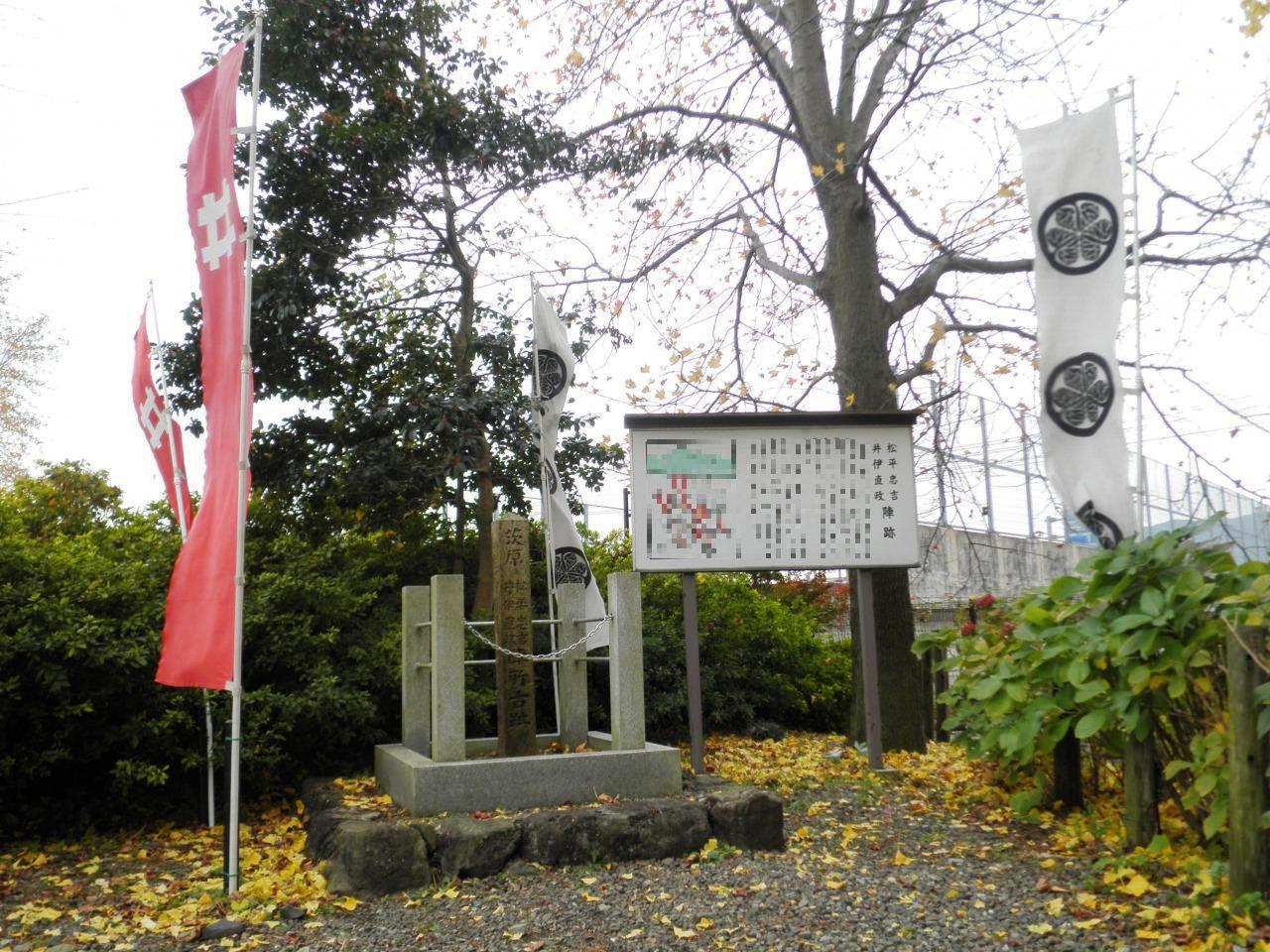
Site of Matsudaira Tadayoshi and Ii Naomasa's Positions during the battle

Regardless of what actually transpired, the turncoat Kobayakawa forces overwhelmed Yoshitsugu's position, as according to Nakatomi Yūhan-ki (臣祐範記), "The armies of Kamigata (referring to Western Army) had the upper hand, until Kobayakawa Hideaki betrayed them and attacked them from behind with over 15,000 men." At the same time, Yoshitsugu's troops also engaged the units led by Tōdō Takatora, while subsequently Oda Nagamasu and Honda Tadakatsu moved forward and intercepted the Toda Katsunari units attacking Masanori's flank. This intercepting movement resulted in Katsunari's death in combat.

Following the defection of Hideaki, Western Army leaders Wakisaka Yasuharu, Ogawa Suketada, Akaza Naoyasu and Kutsuki Mototsuna also changed sides, further turning the battle in the Eastern Army's favor. These four commanders are recorded to have established contact and concluded deals with Tōdō Takatora, one of the main commanders of the Eastern Army, several days before the battle.

Mōri Terumoto, then daimyō of the Mōri clan, also defected from the Western Army during the battle by keeping his forces entrenched at Osaka Castle rather than joining the battle, then sending his vassal Kikkawa Hiroie to quietly surrender to Ieyasu afterward. Professor Yoshiji Yamasaki of Toho University states that any neutrality-for-territorial-preservation agreement was ineffective at best and badly backfired for the Mōri at worst, as their domains were greatly reduced by the Tokugawa following the battle, and some Mōri troops notably did fight with the Western Army at Sekigahara rather than maintaining their neutrality. Sentiments of defection were divided among the Mōri; Mōri Hidemoto, cousin of and commander under Terumoto, genuinely attempted to meet and aid the Western Army, though his efforts were sabotaged by Hiroie, who, under the pretense of being busy eating his meal, stationed his troops in front of Hidemoto, obstructing them from advancing and relieving Mitsunari. Hiroie also obstructed another Western Army contingent led by daimyō Chōsokabe Morichika from marching and attacking the Tokugawa forces.

=== Collapse of the Western Army ===
Map position of the opposing forces at Sekigahara from the first volume of Nihon Senshi (日本戦史), published by the Army General Staff in 1893. This depiction has since been deemed unreliable by historian Jun Shiramine. (Note: professor Jun Shiramine argued this kind of map were relied solely on "Kuroda clan chronicles" record without considering other source materials.)

One of the first and most notable weak points within the Western Army forces developed on Ukita Hideie's front. During the engagement, Hideie's forces began to wane and were steadily overcome by the forces of Fukushima Masanori due to the latter's superior troop quality. The disparity in combat effectiveness may have been attributable to the prior insurrection within the Ukita clan, which caused many senior samurai vassals of the Ukita to desert and join the Tokugawa faction. Hideie was thereby forced to enter Sekigahara with fresh recruits of rōnin mercenaries to fill the gap left within his army. This proved fatal over the course of long-term combat against the Fukushima clan's more disciplined and trained regular troops; the Ukita clan ranks began to break and finally collapse under pressure despite outnumbering the Fukushima.

To the south, Ōtani Yoshitsugu was outnumbered in a successful attack led by Kobayakawa Hideaki; Hiratsuka Tamehiro, along with Oda Nobunaga's sons, Oda Nobuyoshi and Oda Nagatsugu, led a 360-man vanguard on the Fujikawa Plateau under Yoshitsugu. He fought back against Hideaki's troops for a while. However, he was unable to withstand against simultaneous attacks by the forces of Wakisaka Yasuharu, Tōdō Takatora and Kyōgoku Takatomo. In the end, Tamehiro was killed by either Kashii Taibei, a vassal of Yamauchi Kazutoyo, or by Yokota Kohansuke, a vassal of Hideaki. Yoshitsugu committed suicide and his troops retreated shortly thereafter. Amidst the confusion within the Otani clan troops, Toda Katsushige was slain by the Tokugawa forces. (Note: One version reported he was killed by Oda Nagamasu while another version said it was by Tsuda Nobunari.) The Ōtani forces' rout left the Western Army's right flank wide open, which Masanori and Hideaki then exploited to roll the flank of the Western Army. Mitsunari, realizing the situation was desperate, began to retreat his troops. Meanwhile, Western Army commander Shima Sakon was engaged by the troops of Kuroda Nagamasa, who had taken a detour on the north to flank the Mitsunari and Sakon positions. In the end, Sakon was shot and fatally wounded by a round from an arquebus.

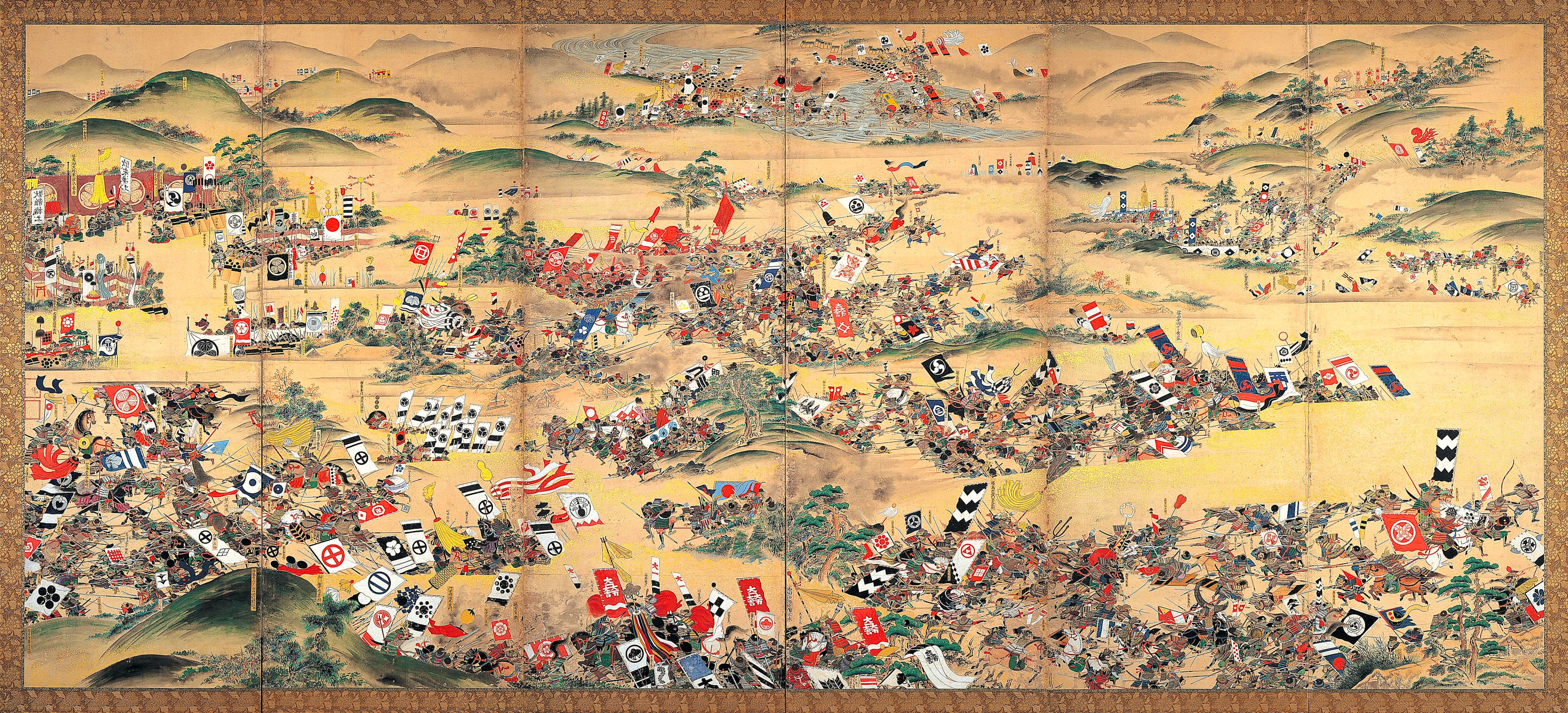
Edo period screen depicting the Battle of Sekigahara – 160,000 men fought on October 21, 1600.

Following the capitulation of Sakon's unit, Shimazu Yoshihiro found his troops completely surrounded by Masanori and Honda Tadakatsu from the front, while Hideaki troops attacked his rear.[37][38] The Shimazu troops only managed to break their encirclement after devastating casualties, escaping with only 200 soldiers remaining; even then, they were pursued by Ii Naomasa until the latter was incapacitated by a shot from a rifleman.[39] This breakout was executed using a fighting withdrawal tactic later termed Sutegamari (捨て奸, a sacrificial rearguard action). While traditional gunki monogatari (military chronicles) romanticize this as a deliberate, heroic charge by Shimazu Toyohisa to save the main force, modern historians caution that such narratives may be Edo-period embellishments designed to glorify the Shimazu clan's survival despite the catastrophic defeat.

The forces of the Western Army continued to crumble without the arrival of reinforcements, their situation continued to deteriorate due to the waves of defections, until the battle had finally concluded. Historian Andō Yūichirō estimated that the battle in Sekigahara took place in its entirety over a mere two hours – from 10:00 to 12:00 – contrary to the Edo-period accepted theory of the battle lasting twice as long. The two hours duration was found in the primary source of the letter of Ieyasu himself which dated October 21, 1600 (Keichō 5, 15th day of the 9th month), at the day of the battle, for Date Masamune, informing the latter about the timing of Eastern Army victory at Sekigahara.

=== Late arrivals ===
The combined Eastern Army forces of Tokugawa Hidetada and Sakakibara Yasumasa, who commanded as many as 38,000 soldiers, were at the time of the battle bogged down in the Siege of Ueda against Sanada Masayuki and Sanada Yukimura, who sided with the Western Army.[41] This division within the Sanada clan was starkly illustrated by Masayuki's eldest son, Sanada Nobuyuki, who remained loyal to the Eastern Army. According to later historical accounts, Nobuyuki's wife, Komatsuhime (Honda Inahime), played a role in securing their domain, allegedly refusing entry to her Western-aligned father-in-law and brother-in-law, though modern historians note this specific episode may be partly apocryphal. At the same time, 15,000 Western Army soldiers were being held up by 500 troops under Hosokawa Yūsai in the Siege of Tanabe in Maizuru, many of the former refusing to advance out of their respect for the Hosokawa. Due to these incidents, large proportions of both armies' forces ultimately never participated in the clash at Sekigahara.

Another Western Army contingent that failed to reach the Sekigahara battlefield was led by Tachibana Muneshige, who had been stalled by Kyōgoku Takatsugu in the Siege of Ōtsu. As result, Muneshige was forced to remain at Osaka Castle after learning of the Western Army's annihilation at Sekigahara. However, when Mōri Terumoto (also at Osaka Castle) offered his surrender to the Eastern Army, Muneshige departed with his army and returned to his homeland in Kyushu.

== Aftermath ==
Although the Eastern Army was victorious, the soldiers of Mōri who did not participate in the battle and holed in the Osaka Castle were largely intact. Ieyasu feared that Terumoto would continue to resist by barricading himself in Osaka Castle with Hideyori. Therefore, on September 17, Ieyasu sent a letter to Terumoto to convince him to leave Osaka Castle by promise of a peaceful settlement between the two.

As soon as the news of the Eastern Army's victory at Sekigahara reached Ogaki Castle, which at the time was still besieged by Mizuno Katsunari, Western Army-affiliated garrison commander Akizuki Tanenaga immediately surrendered and opened the castle for Katsunari. In response, Katsunari immediately wrote to Ii Naomasa asking that Ieyasu pardon Tanenaga, which Ieyasu accepted.

The most prominent political effect of the Eastern Army victory in Sekigahara was the shifting authority to assign military ranks and redistribute lands from the Toyotomi clan to Tokugawa Ieyasu. Immediately following the battle, Ieyasu redistributed domains worth 6.8 million koku, primarily as recompense for the allies instrumental in his victory:

- Ikeda Terumasa was reassigned from Mikawa Province, Yoshida region to a 520,000-koku domain in Harima Province, Himeji region.
- Tōdō Takatora was reassigned to a 200,000-koku domain in Imabari, Ehime.
- Matsudaira Tadayoshi was reassigned from a 100,000-koku domain in Musashi Province, Yuki region, to a 520,000-koku domain in Echizen Province, Fukui region.
- Yūki Hideyasu was reassigned from a 101,000-koku domain in Shimōsa Province, Shinobu region, to a 569,000-koku domain in Owari Province, Kiyosu region.
- Gamō Hideyuki was reassigned from a 180,000-koku domain in Shimotsuke Province, Utsunomiya region, to a 600,000-koku domain in Mutsu Province, Aizu region.
- Maeda Toshinaga had his 835,000-koku domain in Kaga Province, Kanazawa region, expanded to 1,100,000 koku.
- Katō Kiyomasa had his 195,000-koku domain in Higo Province, Kumamoto region, expanded to 515,000 koku.
- Kuroda Nagamasa was reassigned from a 180,000-koku domain in Buzen Province, Nakatsu region, to a 523,000-koku domain in Chikuzen Province, Fukuoka region.
- Fukushima Masanori had his 200,000-koku domain in the area of contemporary Aki District, Hiroshima, expanded to 498,000 koku.
- Horio Tadauji had his domains in Matsue, Izumo, expanded to 240,000 koku.
- Asano Yoshinaga was assigned to 376,560-koku domain and the control of Wakayama Castle in Kii Province.
- Ieyasu also bestowed increases of at least into 10,000 koku to many of his fudai daimyō (Tokugawa clan hereditary vassals) whose domain were less than 10,000 koku before the battle.

Notably, Kobayakawa Hideaki, whose defection from the Western Army contributed greatly to Ieyasu's victory, was bestowed a domain which covered parts of Bizen Province and Mimasaka Province and which was worth 520,000 koku. This redistribution of domains was done verbally, instead of by formal letter of intent. Historian Watanabe Daimon suspected this was because Ieyasu was still wary of the existence of Toyotomi clan which had been inherited by Toyotomi Hideyori.

Another defecting daimyo who awarded by Ieyasu was Kikkawa Hiroie. Ieyasu gave him the land which belonged to Mōri Terumoto for his service in obstructing the Western Army during the battle, rewarding Hiroie by punishing Terumoto. This meant Ieyasu reneged his earlier promise to give pardon to Terumoto, and as the Kikkawa clan was traditional vassal of the Mōri clan, Hiroie refused the bestowal and asked Ieyasu to not punish the Mōri clan. Ieyasu cited the reason of his decision to neglect his promise to Terumoto as various letters from many Western Army collaborators which, seized after the battle, heavily implied Terumoto's major role in anti-Tokugawa movement during the war. On October 3, Hiroie once again petitioned to Ieyasu to spare Terumoto from abolishment, and for the provinces of Suo and Nagato Domains bestowed to him to be given to Terumoto. On October 10, Ieyasu decided to spare the Mōri clan from territorial abolition, but he still stripped away much of Terumoto's fiefs, from eight provinces to only two provinces in Suo and Nagato with a total stipend of 298,000 koku.

Takenaka Shigekado, who was awarded with 1,000 koku after the battle, was immediately ordered by Ieyasu to build Kubizuka (head-burial mound) for those who had fallen in the battle of Sekigahara. After that, Shigekado did not accompany the main force of the Eastern Army, which headed west. In the meantime, he captured Konishi Yukinaga, who had fled to Mount Ibuki, and delivered him to Ieyasu, who was advancing to Kusatsu in Omi. As appreciation, Ieyasu then bestowed upon him the sword that belonged to Yukinaga.

Ieyasu bestowed smaller domain increases to the three remaining Shitennō (Ii Naomasa, Honda Tadakatsu, and Sakakibara Yasumasa), his closest high-ranking generals, as compared to those he offered to newer commanders and vassals. Some 20th-21st historians believed it is possible this perceived disparity was the result of those generals choosing to decline Ieyasu's offers of extensive compensation. However, although Yasumasa indeed declined Ieyasu's offer for 250,000 koku of Mito Domain, Arthur Lindsay Sadler recorded that Naomasa and Honda Tadakatsu expressed dissatisfaction due to their rewards from Ieyasu.

Kinoshita Katsutoshi became one of the two Eastern Army daimyo who was stripped from his domain despite siding with Ieyasu during the conflict. The perceived reason was because of his cowardice as he abandoned Fushimi castle during its siege, leaving Torii Mototada to defend the castle alone. This enraged Ieyasu, who demoted him. However, after his father, Iesada, died in 1608, through the intermediation of Kōdai-in, he was granted his estate (25,000 koku in Ashimori Domain, at Bitchu Province) and was left to his discretion. Ieyasu had also decided to divide his estate between Katsutoshi and Toshifusa, but Kodaiin gave the entire estate to Katsutoshi as she favored him. Another Daimyo was Miyabe Nagafusa, who was demoted and stripped from his title, due to slander by Tanaka Yoshimasa that Nagafusa intended to defect to the Western Army, despite participating in the attack on Sawayama Castle as part of the Eastern Army.

As for the generals of the defeated Western Army, roughly 87 daimyō had their domains confiscated and their power stripped due to their support of Mitsunari in the battle. The long-standing Chōsokabe clan, headed by Chōsokabe Morichika, was stripped of its title and domain of Tosa Province, which was consequently given to Yamauchi Kazutoyo in recognition of his service to the Tokugawa. Several former Chōsokabe retainers resisted the forcible takeover by the Tokugawa and Kazutoyo; in response, Ii Naomasa sent military reinforcements to assist Kazutoyo in suppressing the rebellion of Chōsokabe vassals in Tosa. Suzuki Hyōe, vassal of Naomasa, relieved Kazutoyo with an army transported by 8 ships, ultimately pacifying the region in 5 weeks after killing about 273 enemies.

On September 17, Ieyasu dispatched his army, led by Kobayakawa Hideaki, to attack Sawayama Castle in Ōmi Province, the home base of Mitsunari. Most of the castle's troops had been sent to Sekigahara, leaving the castle's garrison with only 2,800 men. Despite Mitsunari's absence, the defense of the castle was initially successful under the leadership of Mitsunari's father Ishida Masatsugu and brother Masazumi. Following the defection of retainer Moritomo Hasegawa and other defenders, the castle was opened to the besieging army; most of Mitsunari's relatives, including Masatsugu, Masazumi, and Mitsunari's wife Kagetsuin, were killed in battle or committed suicide. (Note: After the castle fell in 1601, Naomasa appointed to take control to Sawayama Castle, However, as Naomasa has no intention to keep the castle, he immediately dismantle the structures of Sawayama Castle, while its materials were moved to renovate and expand Hikone Castle, the traditional castle belonged to the Ii clan.)

In response to Shimazu Yoshihiro's support of the Western Army, Ieyasu prepared a massive punitive expedition to Kyushu, to be led by his son Tokugawa Hidetada. This force was to be composed of Eastern Army forces thereupon engaged in the West, including the armies of Katō Kiyomasa, Kuroda Yoshitaka, Nabeshima Naoshige, and the Tachibana clan. However, this operation was aborted once Shimazu Yoshihisa, the head of the Shimazu clan, entered negotiations with Ieyasu. Shimazu-Tokugawa deliberations continued until 1602 and were aided by the intercession of Kiyomasa, Yoshitaka, and Tachibana Muneshige; ultimately, the Shimazu clan avoided punishment, becoming the only Western Army-aligned clan to avoid losing territory after the defeat at Sekigahara.

On November 6, Ishida Mitsunari, Konishi Yukinaga and Ankokuji Ekei were captured and executed.

In 1603, Ieyasu was officially appointed as shōgun by Emperor Go-Yōzei.

In 1931, the location of the battle was registered as a Monument of Japan. The positions of Ieyasu and Mitsunari's armies, and that of the death of Ōtani Yoshitsugu, are commemorated therein.

== Historical analysis ==
As the conclusion of the Battle of Sekigahara has served as the de facto beginning of the Edo period, and more generally, of the return of stability to Japan, in 1664, Hayashi Gahō, Tokugawa historian and rector of Yushima Seidō, wrote:

Evil-doers and bandits were vanquished and the entire realm submitted to Lord Ieyasu, praising the establishment of peace and extolling his martial virtue. That this glorious era that he founded may continue for ten thousands upon ten thousands of generations, coeval with heaven and earth.

Jakob Meckel, (28 March 1842 – 5 July 1906), a general in the Prussian army and foreign advisor to the government of Meiji period Japan, once analyzed the map of the forces distribution at the Battle of Sekigahara. Jakob deduced that the Western Army, due to greater numbers and better positions on higher ground, should have won. At first, Jakob was skeptical with a Japanese staff officer's explanation that it was the Eastern army had won, only believing so after the officer explained to him about the flow of the battle.

20th-21st century Japanese historians such as Kasaya Kazuhiko, Mizuno Goki, Watanabe Daimon and others pointed that among major factors which influenced the result of the battle of Sekigahara, it was the perceived unpopularity of Ishida Mitsunari and the resentment of many powerful daimyo lords of that time, particularly those who involved in the Japanese invasions of Korea, as they felt their achievements during the campaign was undermined by Mitsunari's report, or even Mitsunari's own mismanagement under Hideyoshi.

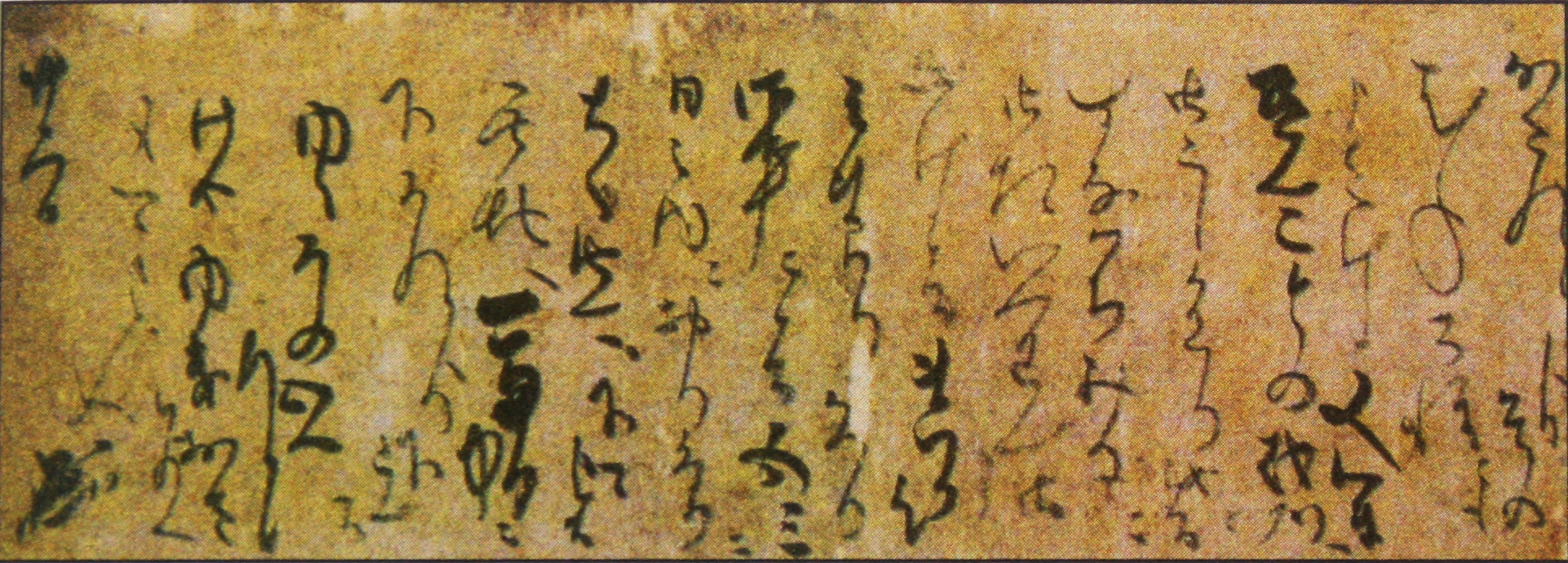
Ishida Mitsunari's letter to Toyotomi Hideyoshi, expressing a negative opinion of some generals' (including Kobayakawa Hideaki) reckless action during the Japanese invasions of Korea.

One notable example was in 1598, when several daimyo lords, which colloquially known as the "Military Faction" of Toyotomi government, such as Fukushima Masanori, Katō Kiyomasa, Ikeda Terumasa, Hosokawa Tadaoki, Asano Yoshinaga, Katō Yoshiaki, Kuroda Nagamasa, Hachisuka Iemasa, Tōdō Takatora, and Kuroda Yoshitaka brought their troops and entourage to storm Ishida's residence to confront Mitsunari. At first, those daimyo lords gathered at Kiyomasa's mansion in Osaka Castle, and from there they marched to Mitsunari's mansion. However, Mitsunari had learned of this from a report by a servant of Toyotomi Hideyori named Jiemon Kuwajima, and fled to mansion together with Shima Sakon and others to hide. The heated situation forced Mitsunari to even flee and hid himself at the Satake Yoshinobu's residence, and then at Fushimi Castle, Before Tokugawa Ieyasu himself acted as mediator for the dispute to calm those daimyo who resented Mitsunari.

Even Kobayakawa Hideaki's fief of Chikuzen and Chikugo was confiscated due to the rumored Mitsunari's slander against him on the aftermath of Korean war. It was said that Hideaki held grudge towards Mitsunari as he thought the confiscation of his fief was because Mitsunari game him bad assessment During the siege of Ulsan. However, Watanabe Daimon warned that such rumor was baseless as Hideaku was not involved in the siege of Ulsan, and the rumor of Mitsunari influenced the confiscation of Hideaki's domains was probably just because the political mood and historical bias during that time, where many tends to blame Mitsunari for everything goes wrong prior to Sekigahara battle. (Note: Hifeaki's grudge theory was anecdotal, as historically, Hideaki was actually transferred to Echizen.) Nevertheless, Daimon still pointed out that Mitsunari already made too many enemies the moment he started hostility against Ieyasu, as according to the Keicho Kenbunsho, on the eve of the battle of Sekigahara, even his close ally Otani Yoshitsugu warned Mitsunari, saying, "You are hated by the daimyos, so if you raise an army, those who sued you last year will become your enemies.". Furthermore, Yoshitsugu also cited the difference in the amount of Koku, the number of soldiers, and the amount of material resources between Ieyasu and Mitsunari, as well as the difference in military experience and ability, and said that there was no way Mitsunari could defeat Ieyasu.

Yūichi Goza, Assistant Professor at the International Research Center for Japanese Studies, concludes that Mitsunari naively overestimated the authority of Toyotomi clan, while in reality, many daimyo were pragmatic enough to prioritize following Tokugawa Ieyasu, who was viewed as extremely powerful figure of the time. Goza pointed out several indications one of them is the surprising letter of Mitsunari with the indication he believes he still could persuade Fukushima Masanori to join him to oppose Ieyasu. Similarly, Toshi Kohara, a Japanese anthropologist and professor emeritus of Rikkyo University, believed that despite those daimyo were originally vassals of Hideyoshi, they are convinced that fighting for Ieyasu and opposing Mitsunari was the best course for the interest of Hideyoshi's heir, Toyotomi Hideyori.

Kazuto Hongo, researcher from the University of Tokyo, remarked that Sekigahara campaign was essentially more of Ieyasu's political victory rather than military one. This took account from most political and factional advantages Ieyasu has secured that ultimately become critical factors for the outcome of this war, including the approval from the mother of Hideyori, Ōmandokoro, for his operation.

According to one historical record from Chikugo Province, Tachibana Muneshige was once advised by his senior retainer, Komono Masutoki, to side with the Eastern Army, saying that the Western Army had no chance of winning. However, Muneshige replied that he does not care about winning or losing.

== Statistics and chronology ==
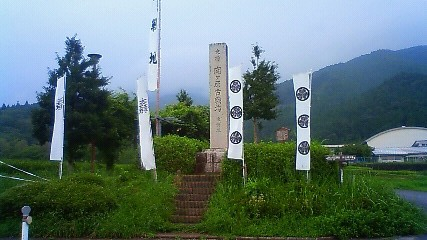
Battle of Sekigahara monument.

Commanders
Commanders of Eastern Army (Tokugawa Force)	Commanders of Western Army (Ishida Force)
Tokugawa Ieyasu (head of the alliance): 30,000 men; Maeda Toshinaga; Date Masamune; Katō Kiyomasa: 3,000 men; Fukushima Masanori: 6,000 men; Hosokawa Tadaoki: 5,000 men; Numata Jakō; Asano Yoshinaga: 6,510 men; Ikeda Terumasa: 4,560 men; Kuroda Nagamasa: 5,400 men; Katō Yoshiaki: 3,000 men; Komatsuhime; Tanaka Yoshimasa: 3,000 men; Tōdō Takatora: 2,490 men; Sanada Nobuyuki; Mogami Yoshiaki; Yamauchi Kazutoyo: 2,058 men; Hachisuka Iemasa; Honda Tadakatsu: 500 men; Terazawa Hirotaka: 2,400 men; Ikoma Kazumasa: 1,830 men; Ii Naomasa: 3,600 men; Matsudaira Tadayoshi: 3,000 men; Oda Nagamasu: 450 men; Tsutsui Sadatsugu: 2,850 men; Kanamori Nagachika: 1,140 men; Tomita Nobutaka: 1,300 men; Yuki no Kata; Okaji no Kata; Furuta Shigekatsu: 1,200 men; Wakebe Mitsuyoshi; Horio Tadauji; Nakamura Kazutada; Arima Toyouji 900 men; Kyōgoku Takatomo: 3,000 men; Kuki Moritaka	Mōri Terumoto (official head of the alliance) (not present); Ishida Mitsunari (de facto head of the alliance): 4,000 men; Niwa Nagashige; Uesugi Kagekatsu; Maeda Toshimasa (Brother of Maeda Toshinaga); Ukita Hideie: 17,000 men; Shimazu Yoshihiro: 1,500 men; Kobayakawa Hideaki (defected): 15,600 men; Konishi Yukinaga: 4,000 men; Mashita Nagamori; Ogawa Suketada (defected): 2,100 men; Ōtani Yoshitsugu: 600 men; Ōtani Yoshiharu: 3,500 men; Wakisaka Yasuharu (defected): 990 men; Ankokuji Ekei: 1,800 men; Satake Yoshinobu; Oda Hidenobu; Chōsokabe Morichika: 6,600 men; Kutsuki Mototsuna (defected): 600 men; Akaza Naoyasu (defected): 600 men; Kikkawa Hiroie (defected): 3,000 men; Natsuka Masaie: 1,500 men; Mōri Hidemoto: 15,000 men; Tachibana Ginchiyo; Toda Katsushige: 1,500 men; Sanada Masayuki; Sanada Yukimura: 40 men; Shima Sakon: 1,000 men; Gamō Yorisato: 1,000 men; Shimazu Toyohisa: 750 men; Kuki Yoshitaka; Vassals of the Toyotomi: 2,000 men

The participants of the Battle of Sekigahara are listed below, with corresponding troop count estimates (in tens of thousands): ○ = Main daimyō who participated in the Battle of Sekigahara

● = Daimyō who defected

	Daimyō	Kokudaka (hundreds)		Daimyō	Kokudaka (hundreds)
Western Army	Mōri Terumoto	121.0	Eastern Army	Tokugawa Ieyasu ○	256.0
Western Army	Uesugi Kagekatsu	120.0	Eastern Army	Maeda Toshinaga	84.0
Western Army	Satake Yoshinobu	54.0	Eastern Army	Date Masamune	58.0
Western Army	Shimazu Yoshihiro ○	73.0	Eastern Army	Katō Kiyomasa	20.0
Western Army	Ukita Hideie ○	57.0	Eastern Army	Fukushima Masanori ○	24.0
Western Army	Ishida Mitsunari ○	19.4	Eastern Army	Hosokawa Tadaoki ○	18.0
Western Army	Konishi Yukinaga ○	20.0	Eastern Army	Asano Yoshinaga ○	16.0
Western Army	Mashita Nagamori	20.0	Eastern Army	Ikeda Terumasa ○	15.0
Western Army	Ogawa Suketada ●	7.0	Eastern Army	Kuroda Nagamasa ○	18.0
Western Army	Ōtani Yoshitsugu ○	5.0	Eastern Army	Katō Yoshiaki ○	10.0
Western Army	Wakisaka Yasuharu ●	3.0	Eastern Army	Tanaka Yoshimasa ○	10.0
Western Army	Ankokuji Ekei ○	6.0	Eastern Army	Tōdō Takatora ○	11.0
Western Army	Kobayakawa Hideaki ●	37.0	Eastern Army	Mogami Yoshiaki	24.0
Western Army	Oda Hidenobu	13.5	Eastern Army	Yamauchi Kazutoyo ○	6.0
Western Army	Chōsokabe Morichika ○	22.0	Eastern Army	Hachisuka Yoshishige	17.7
Western Army	Kutsuki Mototsuna ●	2.0	Eastern Army	Honda Tadakatsu ○	(10.0)
Western Army	Akaza Naoyasu ●	2.0	Eastern Army	Terazawa Hirotaka ○	8.0
Western Army	Kikkawa Hiroie ●	(14.2)	Eastern Army	Ikoma Kazumasa ○	15.0
Western Army	Natsuka Masaie ○	5.0	Eastern Army	Ii Naomasa ○	(12.0)
Western Army	Mōri Hidemoto ○	(20.0)	Eastern Army	Matsudaira Tadayoshi ○	13.0
Western Army	Toda Katsushige ○	1.0	Eastern Army	Tsutsui Sadatsugu ○	20.0
Western Army	Sanada Masayuki	4.0	Eastern Army	Kyōgoku Takatomo ○	10.0

Below is a chronology of the events leading up to and shortly following the Battle of Sekigahara:

- May 7 – Ieyasu asks Uesugi Kagekatsu for explanations for his military mobilization. Kagekatsu refuses Ieyasu.
- June 8 – Ieyasu calls his allies to punish the Uesugi.
- July 12 – Ieyasu holds a meeting in Osaka to plan the punishment of the Uesugi, attended by Hosokawa Tadaoki, Date Masamune, Mogami Yoshiaki, Satake Yoshinobu and Nanbu Toshinao.
- July 26 – Ieyasu leaves Fushimi Castle after meeting with Torii Mototada.
- August 16 – Mitsunari meets with Ōtani Yoshitsugu and convinces him to take sides against the Tokugawa.
- August 17 – Ishida Mitsunari, Ankokuji Ekei, Ōtani Yoshitsugu and Mashita Nagamori meet in Sawayama and agree to ask Mōri Terumoto to become commander in chief of the alliance. Nagamori secretly sends Ieyasu news about the meeting.
- August 19 – Siege of Tanabe: while Hosokawa Tadaoki's army was en route to attack Uesugi and Mitsunari's Western Army, Ikoma Chikamasa's forces under Onoki Shigekatsu attack Tanabe Castle against Hosokawa Fujitaka.
- August 22 – Mōri Terumoto arrives at Osaka Castle and takes command of the Western Army.
- August 23 – Battle of Gifu Castle: Western-aligned Oda Hidenobu is besieged and defeated by Ikeda Terumasa, Ikeda Sen and Fukushima Masanori of the Eastern Army.
- August 27 – Siege of Fushimi, led by Mitsunari and Kobayakawa Hideaki.
- August 29 – Ieyasu establishes his headquarters in Oyama, Shizuoka to discuss strategy with allies.
- August 30 – Battle of Asai: Maeda Toshinaga of the Eastern Army holds back the forces of Niwa Nagashige and Uesugi Kagekatsu.
- September 1 – Siege of Shiroishi: Uesugi Kagekatsu loses Shiroishi Castle to Date Masamune's pro-Tokugawa troops.
- September 6 – Fall of Tanabe Castle to the Western Army. Fujitaka enters Kameyama Castle, governed by Maeda Shigekatsu in Tanba.
- September 7 – Tokugawa ally Maeda Toshinaga attacks his brother, Toshimasa, and besieges Daishoji Castle. The commander of the garrison, Yamaguchi Munenaga, commits seppuku.
- September 8 – Fall of Fushimi Castle: Torii Mototada and Matsudaira Ietada die.
- September 10 – Ieyasu returns to Edo Castle from Oyama.
- September 15 – Mitsunari's Western army arrives at Ogaki Castle.
- September 29 – Nabeshima Naoshige and other Western Army generals besiege Matsuoka Castle. The Eastern Army occupies the heights of Akasaka, near Ogaki Castle.
- September 29 – Fall of Gifu Castle to the Eastern Army. Tokugawa Hidetada heads towards Nakasendo.
- September 30 – Mōri Hidemoto lays siege to Anotsu Castle, held by Tomita Nobutaka.
- October 1 – Mitsunari returns to Sawayama Castle from Ogaki, asking Terumoto to march. Terumoto has been at Osaka Castle defending Toyotomi Hideyori.
- October 7 – Ieyasu leaves Edo with 30,000 men heading towards Tokaido.
- October 9 – Tokugawa Hidetada reaches Komoro, Nagano, and against the orders of his father, diverts his forces towards Ueda.
- October 12 – Ieyasu passes through Shimada in Suruga. Hidetada camps in Sometani village to besiege Ueda Castle, held by Sanada Masayuki.
- October 13 – Ieyasu passes through Nakaizumi in Tōtōmi. Mōri Hidemoto and Kikkawa Hiroie enter Mino and set up camp near Mount Nangu. Western Army commanders Mōri Hidekane, Tachibana Muneshige and Tsukushi Hirokado besiege Ōtsu Castle, held by Kyōgoku Takatsugu.
- October 14 – Ieyasu receives a secret messenger from Kobayakawa Hideaki, who offers him support. Naoe Kanetsugu leads the Uesugi forces against Mogami Yoshiaki at the Siege of Hasedo.
- October 16 – Hidetada abandons the Siege of Ueda Castle and heads to Mino.
- October 19 – Ieyasu arrives at Gifu Castle in Mino. Kuroda Yoshitaka defeats Ōtomo Yoshimune and other Ishida-allied generals at the Battle of Ishigakibara.
- October 20 – Ieyasu moves to Akasaka. The two coalitions make contact at Kuisegawa, near Akasaka. The Eastern force retreats to Sekigahara. The Western coalition heads to Sekigahara from Ogaki Castle.
- October 21 – Battle of Sekigahara
- October – Siege of Yanagawa: the last battle of the Kyūshū Sekigahara Campaign.
- October 30 – Date Masamune tries to conquer Fukushima Castle but fails and retreats. (In May 1601, during the Battle of Matsukawa, Masamune is repelled by Honjō Shigenaga.)
- November 5 – Naoe Kanetsugu calls for a full withdrawal of all Uesugi forces, putting an end to Uesugi's campaigns in the north.

== Cultural depictions ==
Owing to its pivotal status as the climax of the Sengoku period, the Battle of Sekigahara is a common subject of modern depictions and retellings:

- In 1966, Ryōtarō Shiba authored the historical novel Sekigahara, which has since been adapted into a 2017 film of the same name directed by Masato Harada.
- James Clavell included a historical-fiction depiction of the battle in his 1975 novel Shōgun, later adapted for television in the United States as a miniseries in 1980 and again as a series in 2024.
- Tokyo Broadcasting System aired a television miniseries about the battle in January 1981, also entitled Sekigahara.
- The 2000 real-time tactics video game Kessen is set during the conflict between the Tokugawa and Toyotomi clans, and features the Battle of Sekigahara.
- The 2011 grand strategy video game Total War: Shogun 2 includes Sekigahara as a historical battle, in which the player controls Mitsunari's Western Army.
- The 2017 action RPG video game Nioh portrays events related to the battle.
- Manga series Vagabond portrays legendary samurai Miyamoto Musashi as a participant in the battle.
- The battle was featured in 2023 historical drama What Will You Do, Ieyasu?
- While this battle has been portrayed in numerous NHK Taiga dramas, the version in the 2000 production Aoi —aired to coincide with the 400th anniversary of the Battle of Sekigahara— is particularly notable. The production utilized 60 horses to film the combat sequences. Actor Masahiko Tsugawa, who played the lead role, praised the result as "a magnificent battle scene that will remain in the history of Japanese television drama.
- The battle of Sekigahara is mentioned in the 2024 movie Exhuma by a resurrected Japanese general.
- The battle is depicted during a flashback sequence in the Echoes of Sekigahara story expansion for Ghost of Yōtei, told from the perspective of the Western Army. During the battle, Atsu, the game's protagonist, is tasked with delivering orders from Ishida Mitsunari to signal Kobayakawa's reinforcements, not knowing Kobayakawa has already defected to the Eastern Army.

== Bibliography ==
- Bryant, Anthony J. (1995). Sekigahara 1600: The final struggle for power. Bloomsbury Publishing. ISBN 978-1-8553-2395-7. OL 8992865M.
- Daimon, Watanabe (2021). 関ヶ原合戦人名辞典 [Sekigahara kassen jinmei jiten]. 東京: 東京堂出版. ISBN 978-4-490-10915-3.
- Davis, Paul K. (1999). "Sekigahara, 21 October 1600". 100 decisive battles : from ancient times to the present. New York: Oxford University Press. ISBN 978-0-19-514366-9. Paul Davis used the following sources to compile the chapter "Sekigahara, 21 October 1600" in 100 Decisive Battles: From Ancient Times to the Present "Sekigahara, 21 October 1600."
- De Lange, William (2020). Samurai Battles: The Long Road to Unification. Toyo Press. ISBN 978-94-92722-23-2. in Davis 1999.
- Mitsunari, Junji (2016). Mōri Terumoto: Saigoku no gi makaseokaru no yoshi sōrō. Mineruva Nihon hyōdensen (Shohan ed.). Kyōto-shi: Mineruva Shobō. ISBN 978-4-623-07689-5. OCLC 949847873.
- Pitelka, Morgan (2016). "5: Severed Heads and Salvaged Swords: The Material Culture of War". Spectacular accumulation: material culture, Tokugawa Ieyasu, and samurai sociability. Honolulu: University of Hawaiʻi press. ISBN 978-0-8248-5157-6. JSTOR j.ctvvn521.
- Sadler, Arthur Lindsay. The Maker of Modern Japan: The Life of Tokugawa Ieyasu. G. Allen & Unwin. ISBN 978-0-598-44090-7. in Davis 1999.
- Sansom, George Bailey (1986). A history of Japan. 2: 1334-1615. Stanford, Calif: Stanford Univ. Press. ISBN 978-0-8047-0525-7. in Davis 1999.
- Turnbull, Stephen R. (1977). The samurai: a military history (1st American ed.). New York: Macmillan. ISBN 978-0-02-620540-5. in Davis 1999.
  - —— (2011). Samurai: The World of the Warrior. Bloomsbury Publishing. ISBN 978-1-84908-996-8.
  - ——; Rava, Giuseppe (2012). Tokugawa Ieyasu: leadership, strategy, conflict. Command. Oxford, UK: Osprey Publishing. ISBN 978-1-84908-574-8.
- Vaporis, Constantine Nomikos (2019). Samurai: an encyclopedia of Japan's cultured warriors. Santa Barbara, California / Denver, Colorado: ABC-CLIO. ISBN 978-1-4408-4271-9.
- Wilson, William Scott (2004). The Lone Samurai: The Life of Miyamoto Musashi. Tokyo: Kodansha International. ISBN 978-4-7700-2942-3.
