= Kutsuki Mototsuna =

Japanese samurai commander

Kutsuki Mototsuna (朽木 元綱; 1549 – October 12, 1632) was a samurai commander in Azuchi-Momoyama period and Edo period. His father was Kutsuki Harutsuna (朽木 晴綱). The Kutsuki were a powerful clan at Kutsuki-tani (朽木谷), Takasima-gori, Ōmi Province. His childhood name was Takewakamaru (竹若丸.

At the age of two, Mototsuna succeeded when his father died in battle. At first, he served an Ashikaga shogunate at the Hokosyu. In 1570, Mototsuna helped Oda Nobunaga when he attacked Asakura clan and retired through Kutsuki. He then served Hashiba Hideyoshi after Nobunaga died in 1582.

In 1600 at the Battle of Sekigahara, at the start Mototsuna took part in Ishida Mitsunari's force belonging to Otani Yoshitsugu. However, acting in concert with Kobayakawa Hideaki, Mototsuna, along with Wakisaka Yasuharu, Ogawa Suketada and Akaza Naoyasu, betrayed Mitsunari. After the battle, Ieyasu let Yasuharu govern his domain because of this exploit.

== Family ==
- Father: Kutsuki Harutsuna
- Mother: Asukai Masatsuna's daughter
- Wife: Gyōe's daughter
- Children:
  - Kutsuki Nobutsuna (1582-1662)
  - Kutsuki Tomotsuna (1599-1662)
  - Kutsuki Tanetsuna (1605-1660)
  - daughter married Hori Naomasa
