= Ogawa Suketada =

Japanese daimyo (1549–1601)

- 小川 祐忠

Personal details
- Born: 1549
- Died: 1601 (aged 51–52)

Military service
- Allegiance: Azai clan Oda clan Akechi clan Shibata clan Toyotomi clan
- Battles/wars: Tanba Campaign (1578); Battle of Yamasaki (1582); Battle of Shizugatake (1583); Invasion of Shikoku (1585); Battle of Sekigahara (1600)

Ogawa Suketada (小川 祐忠; 1549–1601) was a daimyō (warlord) in feudal Japan during the Azuchi–Momoyama and Edo periods. Initially Suketada served Akechi Mitsuhide.

In 1582, He participated and served Mitsuhide at the Battle of Yamasaki.

After Mitsuhide defeat, he served Shibata Katsutoyo at Battle of Shizugatake (1583).

After Katsutoyo died, Suketada served Toyotomi Hideyoshi in Invasion of Shikoku (1585). He was given 70,000 koku at Imabari, Iyo Province and became a daimyo.

In 1600, at the Battle of Sekigahara, initially he was part of "Western Army" of Ishida Mitsunari. During the battle he betrayed Mitsunari and switched sides to join Tokugawa Ieyasu's "Eastern Army" along with Kobayakawa Hideaki, Wakisaka Yasuharu, Kutsuki Mototsuna and Akaza Naoyasu. Ieyasu won the battle and became the de facto ruler of Japan. Ieyasu seized Suketada's domain after the battle.
