= Terazawa Hirotaka =

Japanese daimyō

Terazawa Hirotaka (寺沢 広高; 1563 – May 18, 1633) was a Japanese daimyō of the early Edo period. He was a retainer of Toyotomi Hideyoshi, and was the builder of Karatsu Castle.

== Life ==
Hirotaka became lord of Karatsu in 1595.

In 1598, he abandoned his original castle of Nagoya Castle, and started work on a new castle at Karatsu, using many materials from the old one.

In the Battle of Sekigahara in 1600, he joined the forces of Tokugawa Ieyasu. He was rewarded with greater lands around Karatsu, forming a dominion of 123,000 koku.

From 1602 to 1608, The Tokugawa shogunate ordered neighboring tozama domains to contribute to Hirotaka's new castle construction at Karatsu. They did so primarily by excavating its network of moats.

Hirotaka was responsible for part of the overtaxation and mismanagement of the local government which instigated the Shimabara Rebellion shortly after his death.

== In popular culture ==
Hirotaka is a playable character from the Eastern Army in the original Kessen.

Preceded by none	Daimyō of Karatsu; 1593–1633	Succeeded by Terasawa Katataka
