= Toda Katsushige =

Japanese daimyō

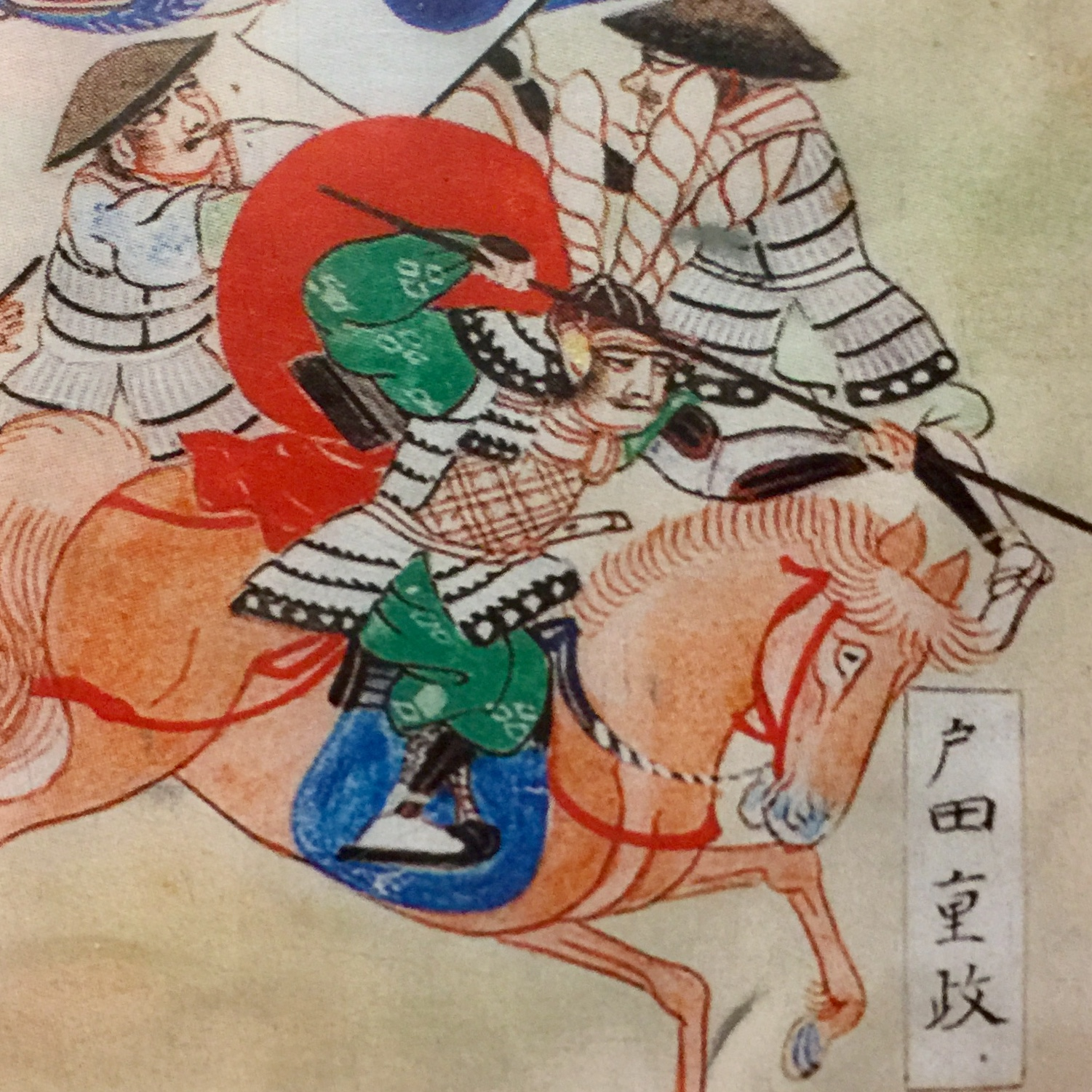
Toda Katsushige

Toda Katsushige (戸田 勝成, 1557 – October 21, 1600) or Toda Shigemasa was a daimyō in Sengoku and Azuchi–Momoyama periods. At first, Shigemasa served Niwa Nagahide. In 1585, after Nagahide died, Shigemasa served Toyotomi Hideyoshi and was given 10,000 koku at Echizen Province.

He took part in the expedition to Kyūshū in 1586, the siege of Odawara in 1590, and the Battle of Bunroku in 1592.

In 1600, he took part in Ishida Mitsunari's force at the Battle of Sekigahara. He fought under the command of Ōtani Yoshitsugu. However, he died in the battle since Kobayakawa Hideaki, Wakisaka Yasuharu, and others betrayed him.

According to one estimate, including those taking part in Tokugawa Ieyasu's force, many people regretted Shigemasa's death because of his strength, and he had been respected by many daimyos.
