= Kutsuki Harutsuna =

Kutsuki Harutsuna (朽木 晴綱, 1518–1550) was a Japanese samurai of the Sengoku period, who ruled Kutsukidani Castle in Ōmi Province. He was a supporter of the shōgun Ashikaga Yoshiharu.

His heir is Kutsuki Mototsuna. Harutsuna's descendants became daimyō in the Edo period. The Kutsuki were a powerful clan at Kutsuki-tani (朽木谷), Takasima-gori, Ōmi Province.

== Family ==
- Father: Kitsuki Tanetsuna
- Wife: Asukai Masatsuna's daughter
- Son: Kutsuki Mototsuna by Asukai Masatsuna's daughter
