= Furuta Shigekatsu =

Furuta Shigekatsu (古田 重勝; 1560 – July 20, 1606) was a Japanese samurai of the Sengoku period of Japan. He fought under Toyotomi Hideyoshi at the Siege of Odawara Castle and in the Bunroku Campaign in Korea (1592–1593). As a reward for his efforts, he received Matsuzaka (37,000 koku) in Ise. He was the first daimyō of that region.

In 1600, he sided with Tokugawa Ieyasu and fought in the Battle of Sekigahara. He survived, and was awarded adjoining territories that include present-day Tsu city, worth 55,000 koku. Furuta contributed stones for the construction of Edo Castle. He died while in Edo, in 1606.
