= Ōtani Yoshitsugu =

Japanese samurai (1558-1600)

- 大谷 吉継
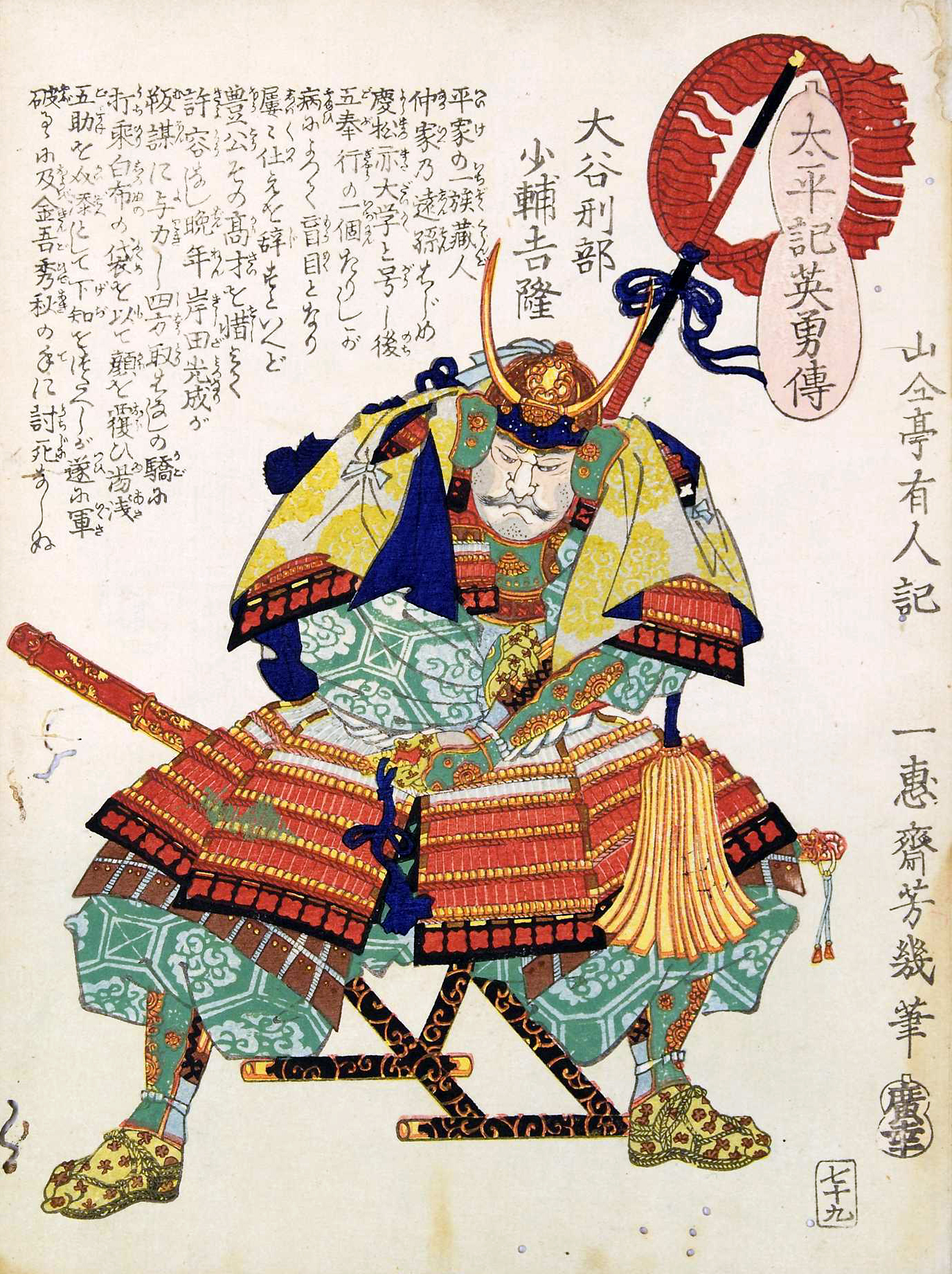
- Ukiyo-e by Utagawa Yoshiiku

Lord of Tsuruga Domain
- In office 1589–1600
- Preceded by: Hachiya Yoritaka

Personal details
- Born: 1558 or 1565 Shiga Prefecture
- Died: October 21, 1600 (aged 41–42) or October 21, 1600 (aged 34–35) Sekigahara, Gifu Prefecture
- Children: Chikurin-in; Ōtani Yoshikatsu; Kinoshita Yoritsugu
- Relatives: Sanada Yukimura (son-in-law); Higashi-dono (mother, maid of Hideyoshi's wife Nene)

Military service
- Allegiance: Toyotomi clan Western Army
- Rank: Gyōbu Shōyū
- Unit: Ōtani clan
- Battles/wars: Battle of Shizugatake (1583); Korean Campaign (1592-1598); Battle of Sekigahara (1600)

Ōtani Yoshitsugu (大谷 吉継; 1558 or 1565 – October 21, 1600) was a Japanese samurai of the Sengoku period through the Azuchi-Momoyama Period. He was also known by his court title Junior Assistant Minister of Justice or Gyōbu-shōyū (刑部少輔). He was born in 1558 to a father who was said to be a retainer of either Ōtomo Sōrin or Rokkaku Yoshikata. He became one of Toyotomi Hideyoshi's followers. He participated in the Toyotomi's Odawara campaign and Korean campaign.

== Personal info ==
Ōtani Yoshitsugu is well known in Japan for two main aspects: his leprosy, and his friendship with Ishida Mitsunari.

While it has not been determined that Yoshitsugu actually suffered from leprosy, rumors circulated that Otani Yoshitsugu was suspected of being the culprit in the 1587 massacre incident at Osaka, where thousands people being slaughtered. In relation to this, the Hongan-ji Diary (also known as the Uno Shusui Nikki) circulates a rumor that Yoshitsugu was a leper who needed corpses to eat to cure his disease.

== Early life ==
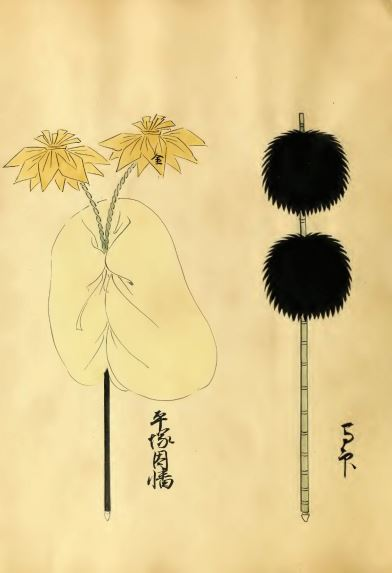
Otani Yoshitsugu Battle standard

The traditional theory stated that his father was Otani Moriharu, a vassal of the Otomo clan, and that he was born when his father went to Bungo Province for medical treatment and became a vassal of the Otomo clan for a time. However, there was no Otani clan with the surname Taira within the Otomo clan at that time.

When the conflict between Hideyoshi and Shibata Katsuie, a senior retainer of the Oda clan, broke out, Yoshitsugu served as a umamawari (horse guard) in Hideyoshi's invasion of Mino Province during this period. The Battle of Shizugatake took place in 1583. During this time, Yoshitsugu bribed Shibata Katsutoyo , the lord of Nagahama Castle, to defect.

In 1590, when Hideyoshi was about to stop at Sunpu Castle on during the siege of Odawara Campaign, Ishida Mitsunari said, "The Suruga Dainagon (Ieyasu) is related to Hojo Sakyo (Ujinao) , and there may be a conspiracy, so I would advise you not to enter the castle." However, Asano Nagamasa and Yoshitsugu rebuked him, saying, "Dainagon-Dono (Ieyasu) is not the type of person to do such a thing," and urged Hideyoshi to enter the castle.

== After Hideyoshi's death ==
In 1599, when the relationship between Ieyasu and Maeda Toshiie became strained and rumors of an attempted of conspiracy to storm the Tokugawa residence spread, Yoshitsugu accompanied Fukushima Masanori and other military commanders of the Toyotomi clan to the Tokugawa residence to guard Ieyasu. Later, when rumor of a plot to assassinate Ieyasu by Maeda Toshinaga emerge, Yoshitsugu led an army to Echizen with the inner circle of Ishida Mitsunari, who had been ousted by Ieyasu.

In the same year, a riot occurred within the Ukita clan, as several of Ukita clan vassals such as Togawa Tatsuyasu, Sadatsuna Oka, and others rebelled against Hideie. The Togawa Family Genealogy first cites the chaos within the domain caused by the alleged unfair land survey carried out by Nakamura Jirobei, Osafune Kii-no-kami, and Ukita Tarozaemon. In response, Sakakibara Yasumasa and Yoshitsugu were appointed as inspectors to mediate this incident. As mediation lacked progress, Yoshitsugu finally decided to allow the rebellious senior vassals to leave the Ukita clan household. The Todai-ki records that Yoshitsugu believed the senior retainers were at fault, while leyasu believed Hideie was the one who responsible. In the end, Yasumasa successfully reconciled the case, and the armed riot was resolved without bloodshed.

Before the Mitsunari-Ieyasu war broke out, Yoshitsugu was said to have repeatedly tried to persuade Mitsunari of the futility of his actions. However, at seeing the staunchness of his friend's convictions, Yoshitsugu joined his cause after mulling it over for several days. At the time, Yoshitsugu's health was deteriorating, making him nearly blind. He could not stand up, let alone fight. He was led to the battleground in a palanquin.

In 1600, as Mitsunari told his intention to oppose Tokugawa Ieyasu, Yoshitsugu warned him, about the possibility of many daimyo lords who will instrad support Ieyasu against Mitsunari. Yoshitsugu said, "You are hated by the daimyos, so if you raise an army, those who sued you last year will become your enemies.". Furthermore, Yoshitsugu also cited the difference in the amount of koku, the number of soldiers, and the amount of material resources between Ieyasu and Mitsunari, as well as the difference in military experience and ability, and said that there was no way Mitsunari could defeat Ieyasu.

== Battle of Sekigahara ==
In 1599, Yoshitsugu gathered his men and moved with the Tokugawa troops as far as Tarui Castle. According to the Keicho Kenmonshu, Mitsunari was at Sawayama Castle and invited Yoshitsugu to his realm. Though blind due to his illness as he entered the gates, Yoshitsugu was appalled to find armed soldiers awaiting him and developed a silent grudge toward Mitsunari. Undeterred, Mitsunari introduced him to his vassal, Shima Kiyooki. Kiyooki flipped Yoshitsugu's perceptions of the Western army, but he wanted to remain within Ieyasu's ranks as he believed Mitsunari could not win. However, for one reason or another, Mitsunari was able to convince Yoshitsugu to defect and join the Western army.

His other activities before the Battle of Sekigahara are not clearly known, but he was said to have suggested Mitsunari to relocate his main base the night before the conflict. Yoshitsugu led an army of 6,500 for the battle, he was command 600 troops and had three subordinates: Hitatsuka Tamehiro with 900 troops, his son, Ōtani Yoshikatsu, with approximately 2,500, and Kinoshita Yoritsugu with 1,000. Other daimyo under command of Yoshitsugu: Toda Katsushige with 1,500 troops.

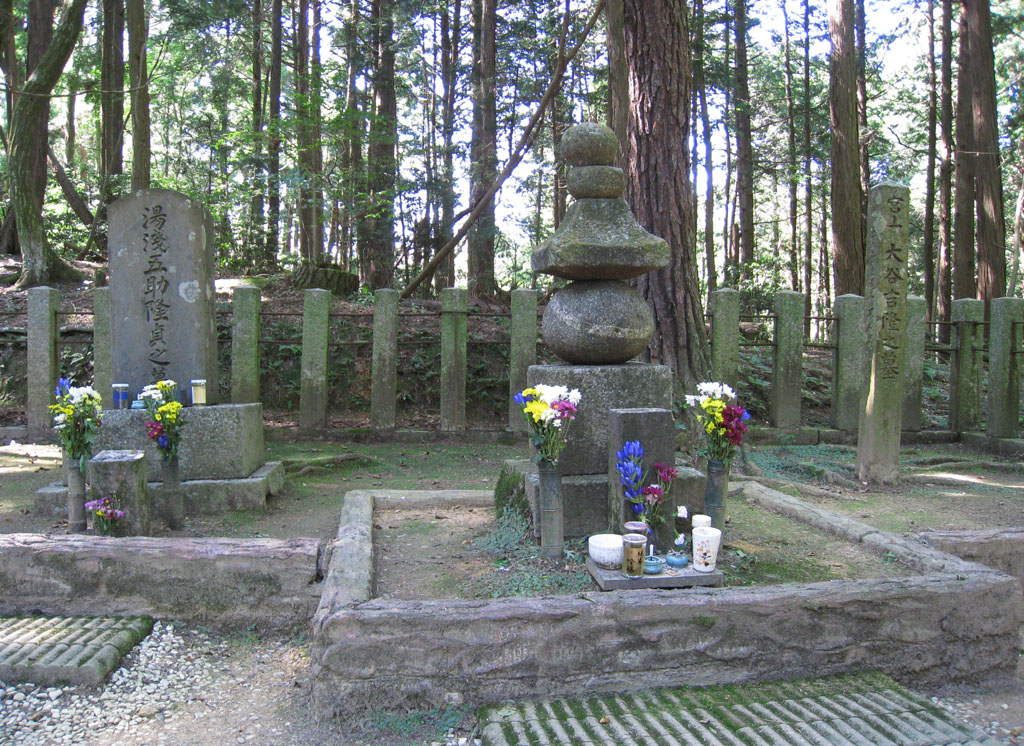
Grave of Ōtani Yoshitsugu

During the battle, Yoshitsugu's troops was outnumbered in a successful attack led by Kobayakawa Hideaki; Yoshitsugu committed suicide and his troops retreated shortly thereafter. Amidst the confusion within the Otani clan troops, Toda Katsushige was slain by the Tokugawa forces. (Note: One version reported he was killed by Oda Nagamasu while another version said it was by Tsuda Nobunari.) The Ōtani retreat left the Western Army's right flank wide open, which Masanori and Hideaki then exploited to roll the flank of the Western Army. Mitsunari, realizing the situation was desperate, also began retreating his troops. Meanwhile, Western Army commander Shima Sakon was engaged by the troops of Kuroda Nagamasa, who had taken a detour on the north to flank the Mitsunari and Sakon positions. In the end, Sakon was shot and fatally wounded by a round from an arquebus.

== In popular culture ==
- Yoshitsugu is one of the Western army's units in the strategy video game Kessen.
- Yoshitsugu is the inspiration for the fictional Lord Onoshi in James Clavell's novel Shōgun.
- Yoshitsugu becomes playable character in Samurai Warriors 4, using saihai as weapon. This incarnation is portrayed as an Azai retainer as well as being a close friend of Todo Takatora before Sekigahara. Unlike most incarnations, Yoshitsugu is able to walk and run on his own though he hides his face and most of his body.
- In Sengoku Collection, Yoshitsugu is a girl plagued with bad luck, often spending her evenings alone searching for four-leaved clovers.
- Yoshitsugu also appears in Sengoku Basara 3 as a cryptic strategist of the Western Army. He is also Motonari's retainer as well as Mitsunari's voice of reason. His goal in the game is to cause all of the other warriors to suffer as much as he has.
- Yoshitsugu also features in the fictional game Nioh, as a general commanding forces against Kobayakawa Hideaki. In the battle of Sekigahara, he is shown as a samurai hidden behind a white hood which covers his face, aside from his eyes. This version of Yoshitsugu is not blind and is armed with daishō (dual katanas). After Kobayakawa's betrayal, he uses the magic of antagonist Kelley to transform into a demon and fight on the front lines of the battle. He is later defeated in a one on one fight with main protagonist William, one of the factors leading in Ishida's defeat.
