= Shima Sakon =

Japanese samurai and daimyō (1540–1600)

- 島 左近
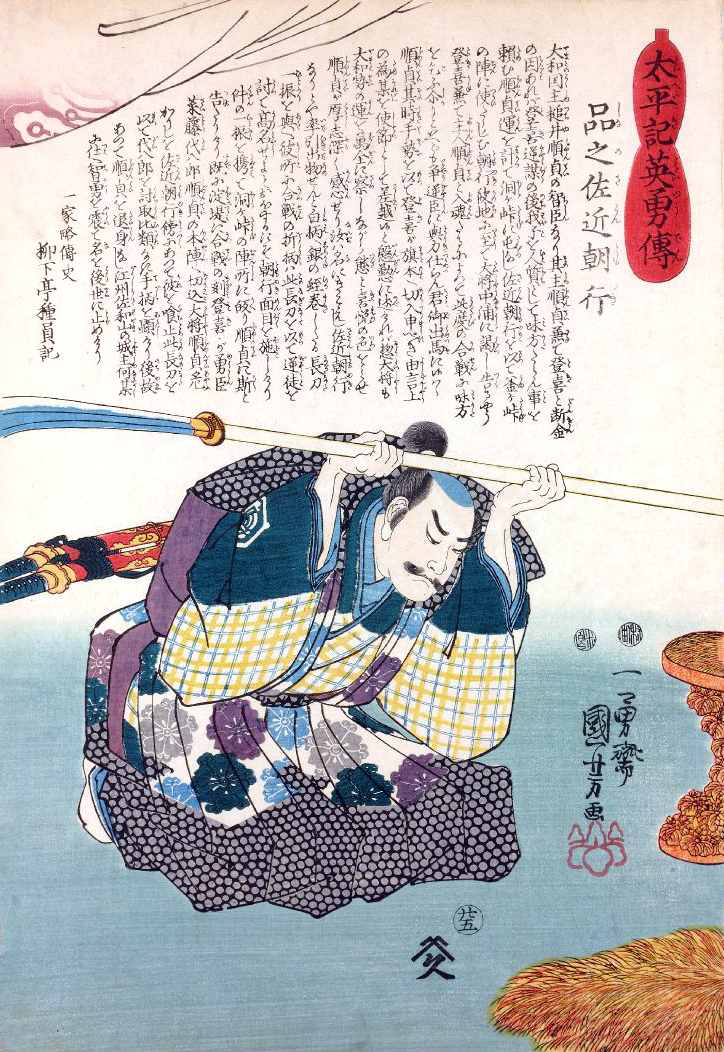
- Born: June 9, 1540; Yamato province, Japan
- Died: October 21, 1600 (aged 60); Sekigahara, Gifu Prefecture
- Other names: Shima Kiyooki, Shima Tomoyuki, Shima Katsutake
- Relatives: Shima Matsukatsu (father); Shima Kiyomasa (son)
- Military career
- Allegiance: Hatakeyama clan Tsutsui clan Toyotomi clan Western Army
- Rank: Commander, Strategist
- Nickname: "Shima Sakon" (Shima Nearby on the Left)
- Conflicts: Battle of Kyōkōji; Siege of Shigisan; Siege of Hijiyama; Kyushu Campaign; Battle of Kuisegawa; Battle of Sekigahara

Shima Kiyooki (島 清興; 9 June 1540 - 21 October 1600), also known as Shima Tomoyuki and Shima Katsutake, was a Japanese samurai of the late Sengoku period. His nickname was Shima Sakon (島 左近) (Shima Nearby on the Left). Sakon would join the services of the Hatakeyama clan, Tsutsui Junkei and Toyotomi Hidenaga before eventually serving under Ishida Mitsunari.

== Biography ==
Sakon was born in the Yamato province to Shima Matsukatsu, a local lords of Yamato Province. The Shima clan was considered to be a resident landholder around present-day Heguri-cho, Ikoma County, Nara Prefecture. Sakon served the Hatakeyama clan who were the Shugo (Governors) of Kawachi Province.

In 1562, Sakon took part in the Battle of Kyokoji in which Hatakeyama Takamasa fought Miyoshi Nagayoshi, but Takamasa was defeated.

Later in 1577, Sakon became one of the two primary samurai officers under Tsutsui Junkei alongside Matsukura Shigenobu. Since he fought under command of Junkei during this time, he became one of the local lords belonging to the Tsutsui clan, gradually distinguished himself as a samurai taisho or samurai commander (a samurai who gives battle orders and maneuvers troops).

After the death of Junkei, It has been said that in January 1586, Sakon hired by Ishida Mitsunari and was convinced to serve the Toyotomi clan under Toyotomi Hidenaga (Hideyoshi’s brother) at Kyushu Campaign.

In 1591, after Hidenaga died, Ishida Mitsunari recruited him into his army as a leading strategist.

Later in 1598 after Hideyoshi died, Sakon proceeded to help Mitsunari as he struggled against Tokugawa Ieyasu.

== Battle of Sekigahara ==
In 1600, a few days before the battle of Sekigahara, Sakon led an assault on Ieyasu's Eastern army at Battle of Kuisegawa with great success. As always, he was one of the bravest generals of Ishida Mitsunari on the battlefield.

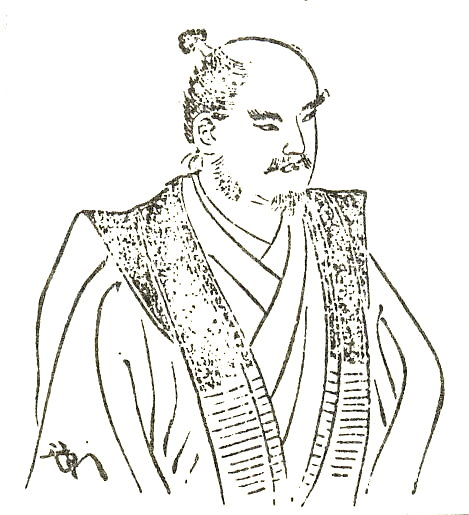
Shima Sakon

On October 21, 1600, at the Battle of Sekigahara, Shima served as one of Ishida's higher-ranking officers, commander of Ishida Mitsunari forces, he commanding a unit of 1,000 men. Some sources suggest Shima led musketmen and that his position had cannons. He fought against Hosokawa Tadaoki and was shot by riflemen led by Kuroda Kanbei's son, Nagamasa, and forcing him to retreat. His fourth son, Shima Kiyomasa, fighting within Otani Yoshitsugu's ranks, was killed by an 'Eastern' samurai named Takagi Heizaburō.

His fate remains somewhat of a mystery since neither he nor his body was on the battlefield after the battle. Some say he died of his wounds after the battle or escaped and died a few years later.
