= Kessen =

2000 video game

- North American PlayStation 2 cover art
- Developer: Koei
- Publishers: JP: Koei; NA/EU: Electronic Arts
- Director: Fumito Kozutsumi
- Designers: Tachiki Kanda; Norimitsu Komine; Fumito Kozutsumi; Takao Sakai; Masahiko Sugahara; Yōichi Wada; Ichiro Yasuda
- Series: Kessen
- Platforms: PlayStation 2, PlayStation Network
- Release: PlayStation 2: JP: March 4, 2000; NA: October 26, 2000; PAL: December 15, 2000; PlayStation Network: JP: July 25, 2012
- Genre: Real-time tactics
- Mode: Single-player

Kessen (決戦; "Decisive Battle") is a real-time tactics video game produced by Koei. It was a launch game for the PlayStation 2 in Japan and North America, where it was published by Electronic Arts. It was initially the only real-time wargame game available for the PlayStation 2.

It is a real-time tactics game set in feudal Japan, focusing upon a conflict between the eastern Tokugawa clan and western Toyotomi clan (with Ishida Mitsunari as the Toyotomi's guardian and protector) shogunates at the end of Sengoku Jidai. Tokugawa Ieyasu served as the primary representative for the Eastern forces where the Western army changed leaders based on the results of select key battles.

Although it was, for the most part, historically accurate, Kessen contained a number of "what-if" scenarios, for example, if the Western forces are victorious at the Battle of Sekigahara (historically an Eastern victory).

Two sequels were later created, Kessen II and Kessen III. These two games introduced magical and meteorological elements to the games.

== Cinematics ==
A note from the game's producer, Kou Shibusawa, addressed to players before any campaign begins, explains his desire to take his own twist on this segment of history but felt too constricted by cinema to do so properly. With Kessen, he believes that he was able to explore his ideas more freely. Thus, several of the game's cutscenes have a theatrical feel similar to chanbara and jidaigeki films.

Before each campaign begins, a narrator enlists a brief summary of the events proceeding the selected campaign to help familiarize players with the battle taking place. After the pre-planning of the battle is finished, a cinematic event occurs, often dramatizing character interactions or significant historical events that took place before the battle occurs. Similar events also occur after the war council, during battle, and at the battle's end.

Among the historically accurate retelling of events, preference for the often romanticized accounts were sometimes used. Notable instances include Hosokawa Gracia ordering a soldier to kill her and Tokugawa Hidetada ordering the assassination of Sanada Masayuki for causing his tardiness at Sekigahara.

== Development ==
Kessen was developed in one year with a budget of $5 million.

== Reception ==
Reception

Aggregate score
Aggregator	Score
Metacritic	75/100

Review scores
Publication	Score
AllGame	2.5/5
Edge	7/10
Famitsu	32/40
Game Informer	8/10
GameFan	82%
GamePro	2.5/5
GameRevolution	B
GameSpot	7.4/10
GameSpy	88%
IGN	8.1/10
Official U.S. PlayStation Magazine	3/5
Playboy	75%

Kessen received "generally favorable reviews" according to the review aggregation website Metacritic. In Japan, Famitsu gave it a score of one nine, one eight, one seven, and one eight, for a total of 32 out of 40.

Some reviewers have described the game as redundant and slow. Cutscenes were cited by one critic to be "the visual appeal to Kessen". Graphics concerning the historical figures were also said to be "over-the-top" and colorful enough to the point of ridiculousness, though impressive. What gained Kessen the most praise was the game's sound department, many citing the orchestral score to be "epic" with one critic noting the "English voices to be good and fitting". Overall, it is seen as a game for history buffs of Japanese history with a good but flawed presentation.

The title won a special prize PlayStation Award in 2000. It was also nominated for the grand prize in the consumers' selection for graphics and scenarios. It was a runner-up for GameSpot's annual "Best Strategy Game" award among console games, losing to Ogre Battle 64.
