= Ōgaki Castle =

Building in Ogaki, Gifu Prefecture, Japan

- 大垣城
- Ōgaki, Gifu Prefecture, Japan
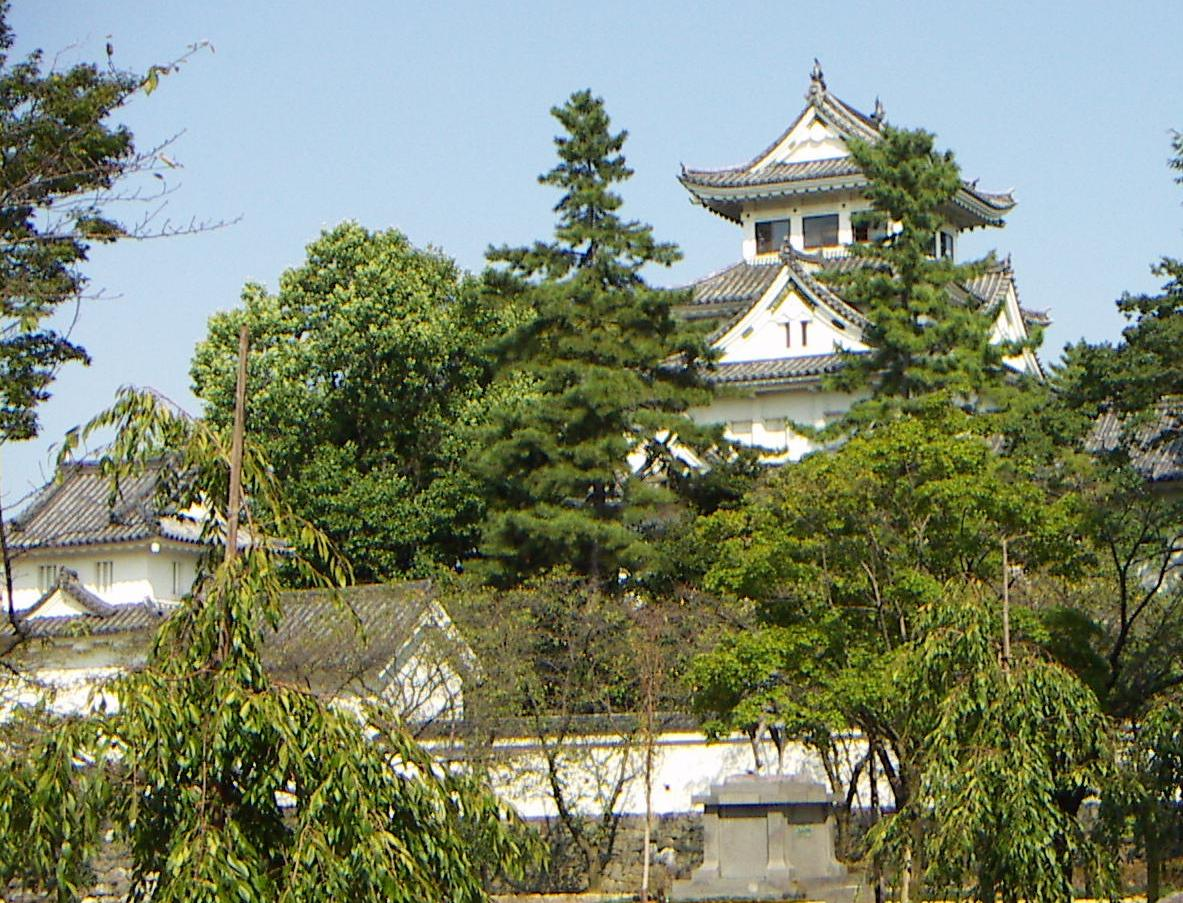
- Ōgaki Castle

Site information
- Type: flatlands-style Japanese Castle
- Condition: Reconstruction

Location
- Coordinates: 35°21′43″N 136°36′58″E

Site history
- Built: 1535
- Demolished: 1871

Garrison information
- Past commanders: Ujiie Naomoto, Ikeda Tsuneoki, Itō Morikage
- Occupants: Ujiie clan, Itō clan, Okabe clan, Matsudaira clan, Toda clan

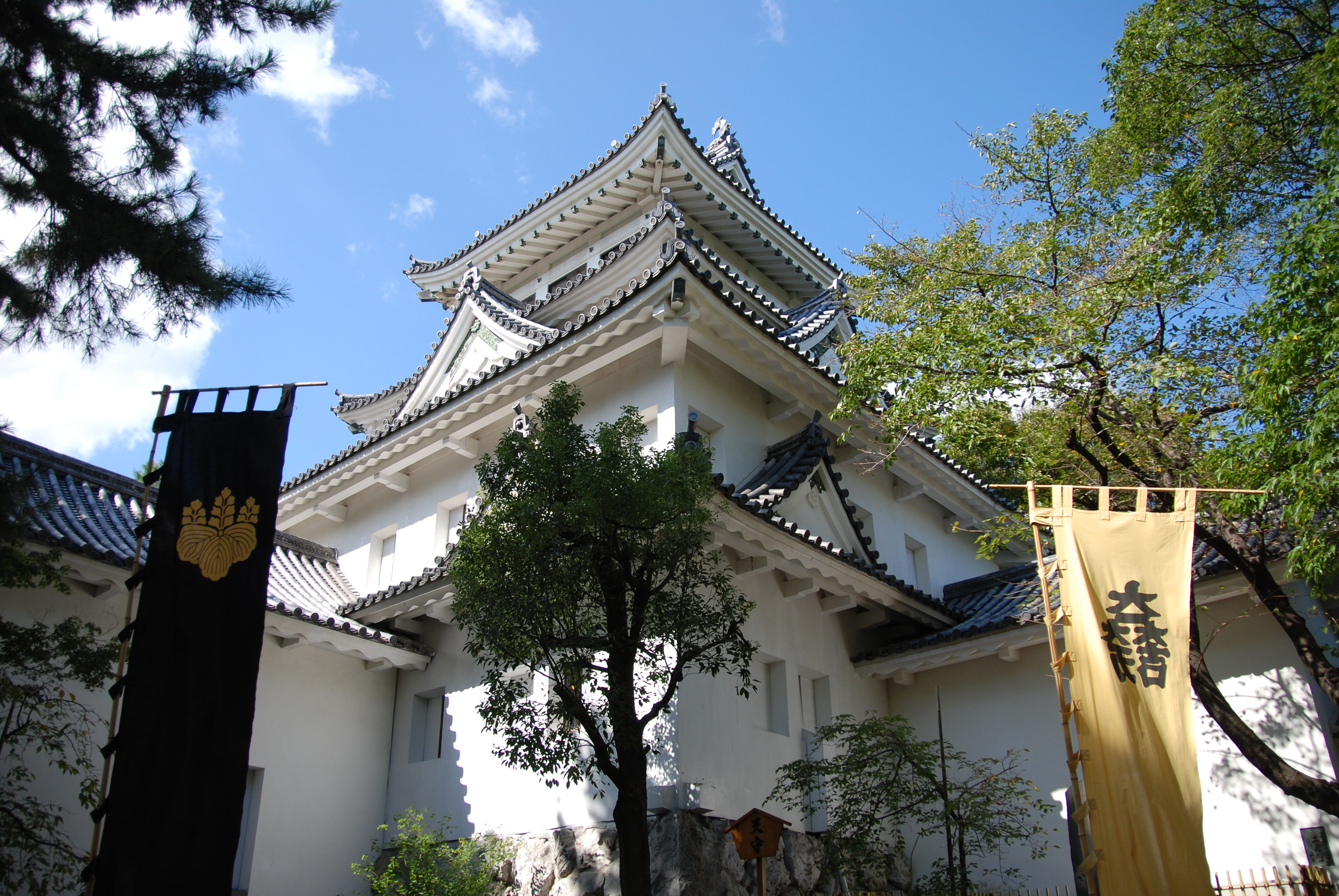
View of the main keep of Ōgaki Castle

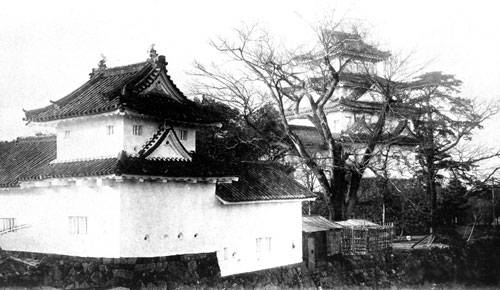
Ōgaki Castle in 1933

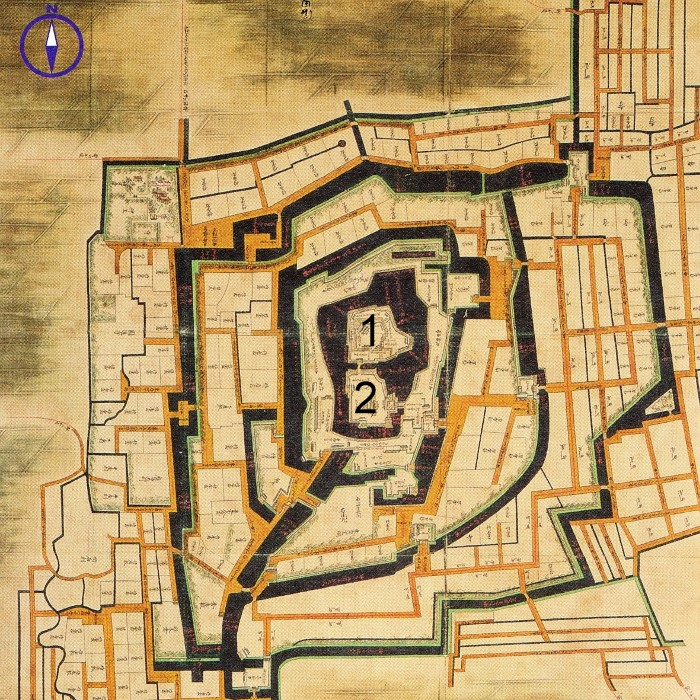
Edo period layout map of Ōgaki Castle

Ōgaki Castle (大垣城, Ōgaki-jō) is a flatlands-style Japanese castle located in the city of Ōgaki, Gifu Prefecture, Japan. During the Sengoku period, Ōgaki Castle was home to several of Toyotomi Hideyoshi's most trusted generals and relatives; during the Edo period, it was home to the Toda clan, daimyō of Ōgaki Domain, who dominated parts of the province of Mino under the Tokugawa shogunate. Other names for the castle include Bi Castle (麇城 Bi-jō) and Kyoroku Castle (巨鹿城 Kyoroku-jō).

== History ==
Ōgaki is located in western Mino Province, and was bordered by the Ibi River and the Kuisegawa River. In addition to its defensive site, the location was also of strategic value in control of the Sekigahara Pass, which was the main overland route connecting Mino with Ōmi Province and Kyoto. A fortification was originally erected on this site by the Miyagawa clan, a local samurai clan, who called it "Ushiya Castle". The area came to be hotly contested in the Sengoku period between Saitō Dōsan and Oda Nobuhide. Under Oda Nobunaga, Ujiie Naotomo followed by his son Ujiie Naomasa ruled the area. Toyotomi Hideyoshi recognized the location's strategic significance, and assigned a succession of his generals to the castle: Ikeda Tsuneoki, Toyotomi Hidetsugu, Toyotomi Hidenaga, Katō Mitsuyasu, Hitotsuyanagi Naosuke, Toyotomi Hidekatsu and finally to Itō Morimasa. Under these generals, the area of the castle was expanded and its defenses strengthened. The central area of the castle was small, but it was encircled by multiple layer of water moats connected to the river, which gave the castle a large total area.

When Tokugawa Ieyasu decided to march westward to seize power from the Toyotomi clan, Ishida Mitsunari attempted to use Gifu Castle and Ōgaki Castle as his front line of defense, and to cut off the approaches to Osaka via the Tokaido and Nakasendō highways. However, Gifu Castle, which was held by Oda Nobunaga's grandson Oda Hidenobu, fell to Ieyasu's vanguard after only one day; Ieyasu chose to quickly move through Mino Province, although a large portion of his army (led by Tokugawa Hidetada) had not yet arrived. At Ōgaki, Itō Morimasa was daimyō of a 30,000 koku domain and a staunch supporter of Ishida Mitsunari, but was an inept commander. Caught by surprise, Ishida Mitsunari concentrated his forces at Sekigahara, setting the scene for the Battle of Sekigahara. Itō Morimasa marched to his support, rather than utilizing the castle for a flanking attack, and was defeated. The castle fell to Tokugawa forces after a small skirmish shortly after the battle.

Under the Tokugawa shogunate, the castle was given to a number of fudai clans until 1635, when the castle and domain were assigned to Toda Ujikane, whose descendants would continue to rule to the Meiji restoration in 1871. Under the Toda, Ōgaki Castle was repaired, with a four-story tenshu and corner yagura watchtowers, and four layers of moats Many of the castle structures were destroyed and the outer layers of moats were filled in by order of the Meiji government after the end of the Edo period, but the central portion of the castle survived largely intact. The area is preserved as a public park.

Due to the historical importance of the castle, including its role in the Battle of Sekigahara, the tenshu and yagura were designated a National Treasure in 1936. However, these structures were all destroyed by American air raids on July 29, 1945. After World War II, the tenshu and two of the yagura were reconstructed based on old drawings and photographs in 1959, albeit in modern reinforced concrete. The tenshu now serves as a museum. Several original gates of the castle have survived but are no longer in their original locations.

The Castle was listed as one of the Continued Top 100 Japanese Castles in 2017.

== Literature ==
- De Lange, William (2021). An Encyclopedia of Japanese Castles. Groningen: Toyo Press. pp. 600 pages. ISBN 978-9492722300.
