= Naitō Ienaga =

Japanese samurai (1546–1600)

Naitō Ienaga (内藤 家長; 1546 – September 8, 1600)

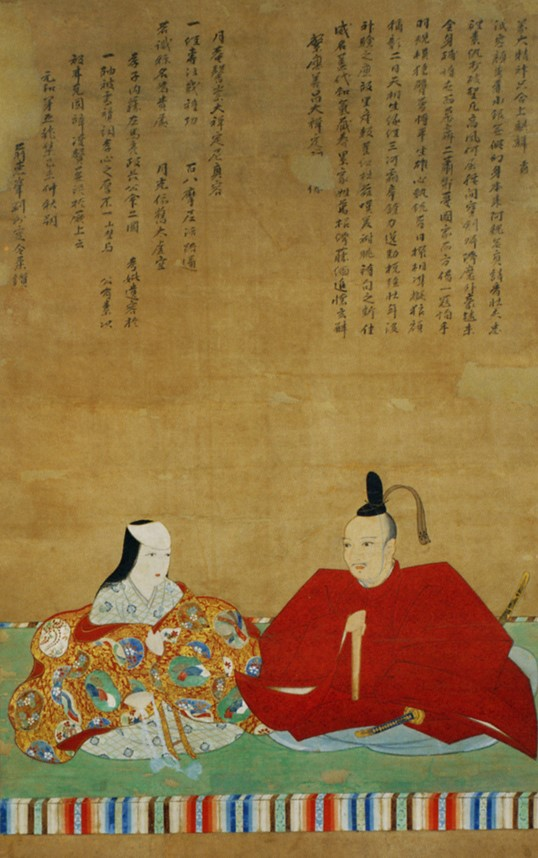
Portraits of Naito Ienaga (1546-1600) and his wife.

was a Japanese samurai of the Sengoku Period through Azuchi-Momoyama Period, who served the Tokugawa clan. He was the son of Naitō Kiyonaga. Ienaga served Tokugawa Ieyasu from a young age, and was famed for his skill with the bow. He assisted in the suppression of the Ikkō-ikki of Mikawa Province, and this earned him Ieyasu's trust.

After Ieyasu's move to the Kantō region in 1590, Ienaga was granted the 20,000 koku fief of Sanuki in Kazusa Province. In 1600, he was assigned to Fushimi Castle together with Torii Mototada and Matsudaira Ietada. He is believed to have been one of the last of the castle's defenders to be killed, during the assault on the castle by the forces of Ishida Mitsunari.

Ienaga was succeeded by his son Masanaga, who served during the Osaka Campaign of 1615.

Preceded by none	1st Lord of Sanuki (Naitō); 1590-1600	Succeeded by Naitō Masanaga
