= Sanuki Domain =

Sanuki Domain 佐貫藩
- under Tokugawa shogunate Japan
- 1600–1871
- Capital: Sanuki Castle
  - Type: Daimyō
- Historical era: Edo period
  - Established: 1600
  - Disestablished: 1871
- Today part of: part of Ibaraki Prefecture

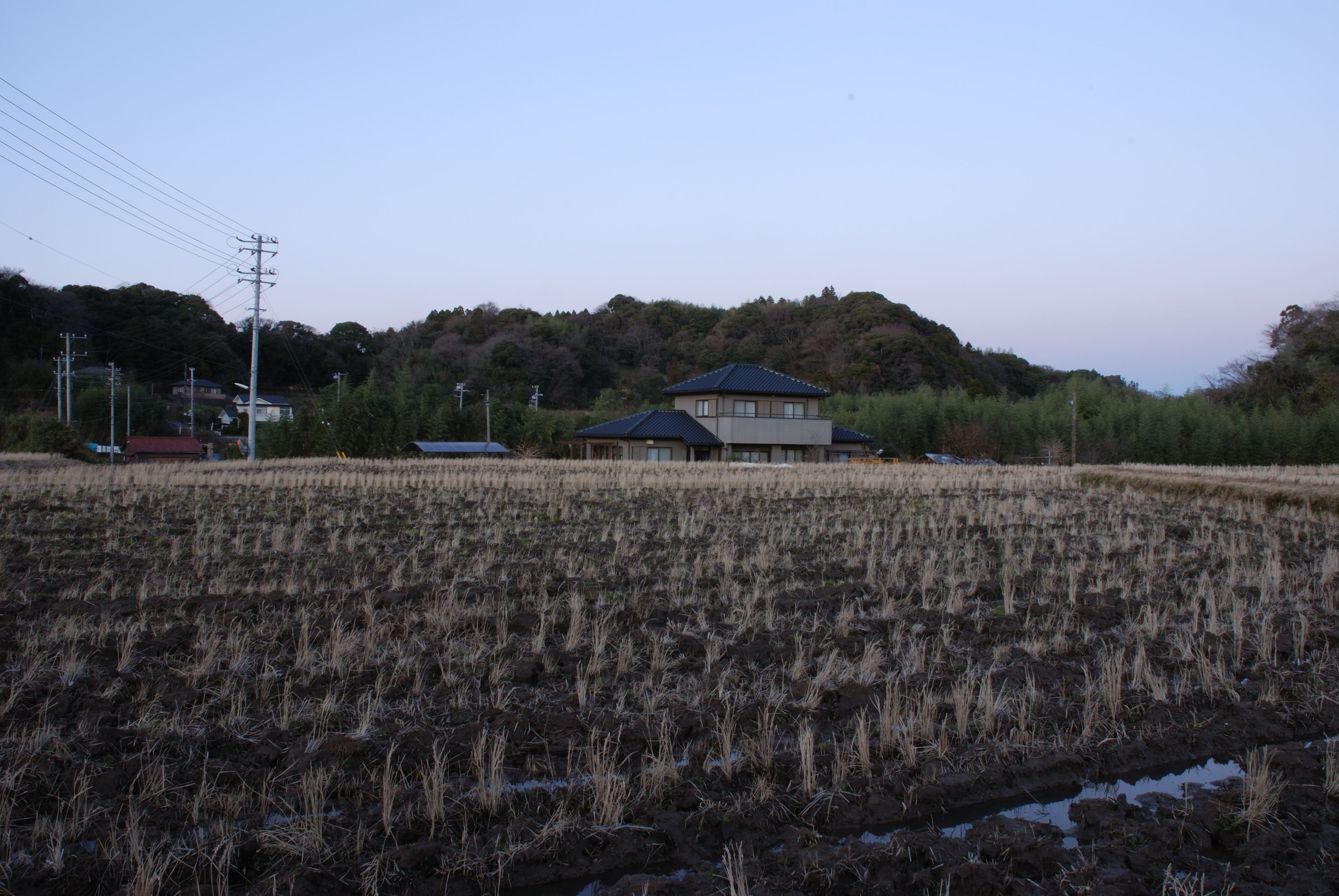
Site of Sanuki Castle, administrative center of Sanuki Domain

Sanuki Domain (佐貫藩, Sanuki-han) was a feudal domain under the Tokugawa shogunate of Edo period Japan, located in Kazusa Province (central modern-day Chiba Prefecture). It was centered on Sanuki Castle in what is now the city of Futtsu, Chiba.

== History ==
The original Sanuki Castle was built by the Satomi clan, rulers of most of the Bōsō Peninsula during the Sengoku period. Following the Battle of Odawara in 1590, the Kantō region by was assigned to Tokugawa Ieyasu by the warlord Toyotomi Hideyoshi, who also restricted the Satomi to Awa Province for their lukewarm support of his campaigns against the Later Hōjō clan. Tokugawa Ieyasu appointed Naitō Ienaga, one of his hereditary retainers, to be daimyō of the newly formed 20,000 koku Sanuki Domain.

During the Siege of Fushimi in 1600 prior to the Battle of Sekigahara, Naito Ienaga was one of the last defenders of Fushimi Castle to fall to the forces of Ishida Mitsunari. He was succeeded by his son, Naito Masanaga, who was awarded an additional 10,000 koku for his efforts at the Siege of Osaka. He gained another 10,000 koku for his participation in the suppression of the Satomi clan at Tateyama Domain in Awa Province, and yet another 5,000 koku when Shōgun Tokugawa Hidetada visited on an extended falconry expedition, thus bringing his total revenues to 45,000 koku. He was subsequently transferred to Iwakidaira Domain in Mutsu Province.

His replacement, Matsudaira Tadashige, was an 8,000 koku hatamoto of Fukuya Domain in Musashi Province, who was elevated to the ranks of the daimyō with an additional 7,000 koku stipend. He was subsequently transferred to Tanaka Domain in Suruga Province and Sanuki Domain reverted to tenryō territory directly under the control of the Tokugawa shogunate.

In January 1639, the domain was revived for Matsudaira Katsutaka, a former jisha-bugyō, whose holdings had reached 15,000 koku, qualifying for the status of daimyō. However, the Matsudaira clan was dispossessed from Sanuki under the tenure of his son, Matsudaira Shigeharu, for mismanagement, and Sanuki Domain again lapsed to tenryō status.

In May 1710, the domain was reestablished as a 16,000 koku holding for Abe Masatane, formerly daimyō of Kariya Domain in Mikawa Province. The Abe clan continued to rule Sanuki until the Meiji Restoration. The final daimyo of Sanuki Domain, Abe Masatsune, initially served with the pro-Tokugawa forces in the Boshin War against the strong advice of his senior retainers and refused to surrender his armory to the new Meiji government. He was subsequently imprisoned for a time, but was pardoned, and was appointed domain governor under the new administration, until the abolition of the han system in July 1871 and subsequently became a viscount under the kazoku peerage. Sanuki Domain became “Sanuki Prefecture”, which merged with the short lived “Kisarazu Prefecture” in November 1871, which later became part of Chiba Prefecture.

The domain had a population of 401 samurai in 91 households, 111 ashigaru in 29 households, and 16,908 commoners in 3314 households per a census in 1869. The domain maintained its primary residence (kamiyashiki) in Edo at Soto-Sakurada.

== Holdings at the end of the Edo period ==
Although most domains in the han system, consisted of several discontinuous territories calculated to provide the assigned kokudaka, based on periodic cadastral surveys and projected agricultural yields, Sanuki Domain was a compact territory located entirely within Kazusa Province.

- Kazusa Province
  - 55 villages in Amaha District
  - 1 village in Mouda District
  - 6 villages in Ichihara District

== List of daimyōs ==
#	Name	Tenure	Courtesy title	Court Rank	kokudaka
Naitō clan (fudai) 1590–1622
1	Naitō Ienaga (内藤家長)	1590–1600	-none-	-none-	20,000 koku
2	Naitō Masanaga (内藤政長)	1600–1622	Sama-no-suke (左馬助)	Lower 4th (従四位下)	45,000 koku
Matsudaira (Sakurai) clan (fudai) 1622–1633
1	Matsudaira Tadashige (松平忠重)	1622–1633	Daizen-no-suke (大膳亮)	Lower 5th (従五位下)	15,000 koku
Matsudaira clan (fudai) 1638–1684
1	Matsudaira Katsutaka (松平勝隆)	1638–1662	Izumo-no-kami (出雲守)	Lower 5th (従五位下)	15,000 koku
2	Matsudaira Shigeharu (松平重治)	1662–1684	Yamashiro-no-kami (山城守)	Lower 5th (従五位下)	15,000 koku
Abe clan (fudai) 1684–1871
1	Abe Masatane (阿部正鎮)	1710–1751	Inaba-no-kami (因幡守)	Lower 5th (従五位下)	16,000 koku
2	Abe Masaoki (阿部正興)	1751–1764	Inaba-no-kami (因幡守)	Lower 5th (従五位下)	16,000 koku
3	Abe Masayoshi (阿部正賀)	1764–1780	Suruga-no-kami (駿河守)	Lower 5th (従五位下)	16,000 koku
4	Abe Masazane (阿部正実)	1780–1792	Hyōbū-Shoyū (兵部少輔)	Lower 5th (従五位下)	16,000 koku
5	Abe Masahiro (阿部正簡)	1792–1825	Suruga-no-kami (駿河守)	Lower 5th (従五位下)	16,000 koku
6	Abe Masataka (阿部正暠)	1825–1836	Yamashiro-no-kami (山城守)	Lower 5th (従五位下)	16,000 koku
7	Abe Masami (阿部正身)	1836–1854	Suruga-no-kami (駿河守)	Lower 5th (従五位下)	16,000 koku
8	Abe Masatsune (阿部正恒)	1854–1871	Suruga-no-kami (駿河守)	Lower 5th (従五位下)	16,000 koku
