= Takatsuki Domain =

Japanese feudal domain located in Settsu Province

Takatsuki Domain 高槻藩
- under Tokugawa shogunate Japan
- 1615–1871
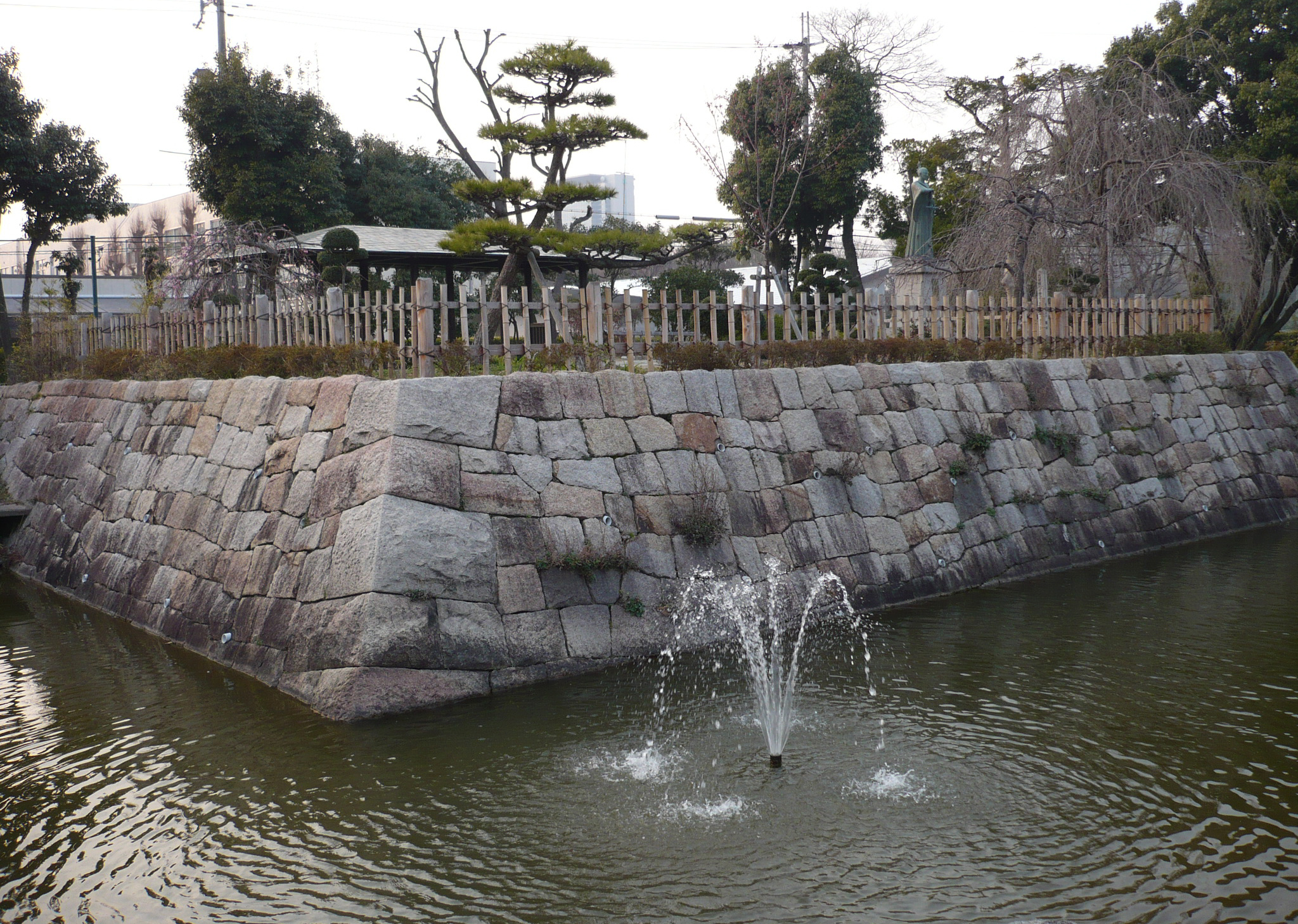
- Takatsuki Castle Park

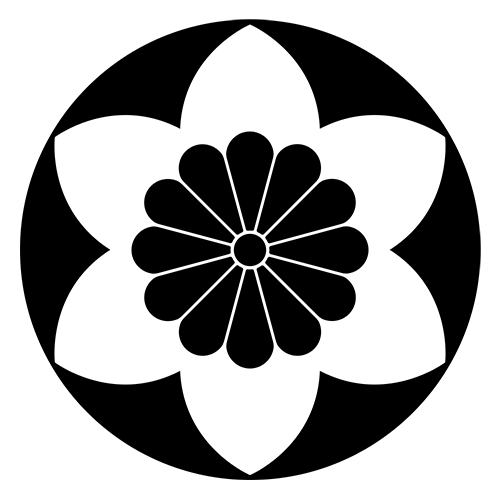
- Coat of arms
- Capital: Takatsuki Castle
- Area
  - Coordinates: 34°50′33.95″N 135°37′15.31″E
- Historical era: Edo period
  - Established: 1615
  - Disestablished: 1871
- Today part of: part of Osaka Prefecture

Location of Takatsuki Castle
Takatsuki Domain (Japan)

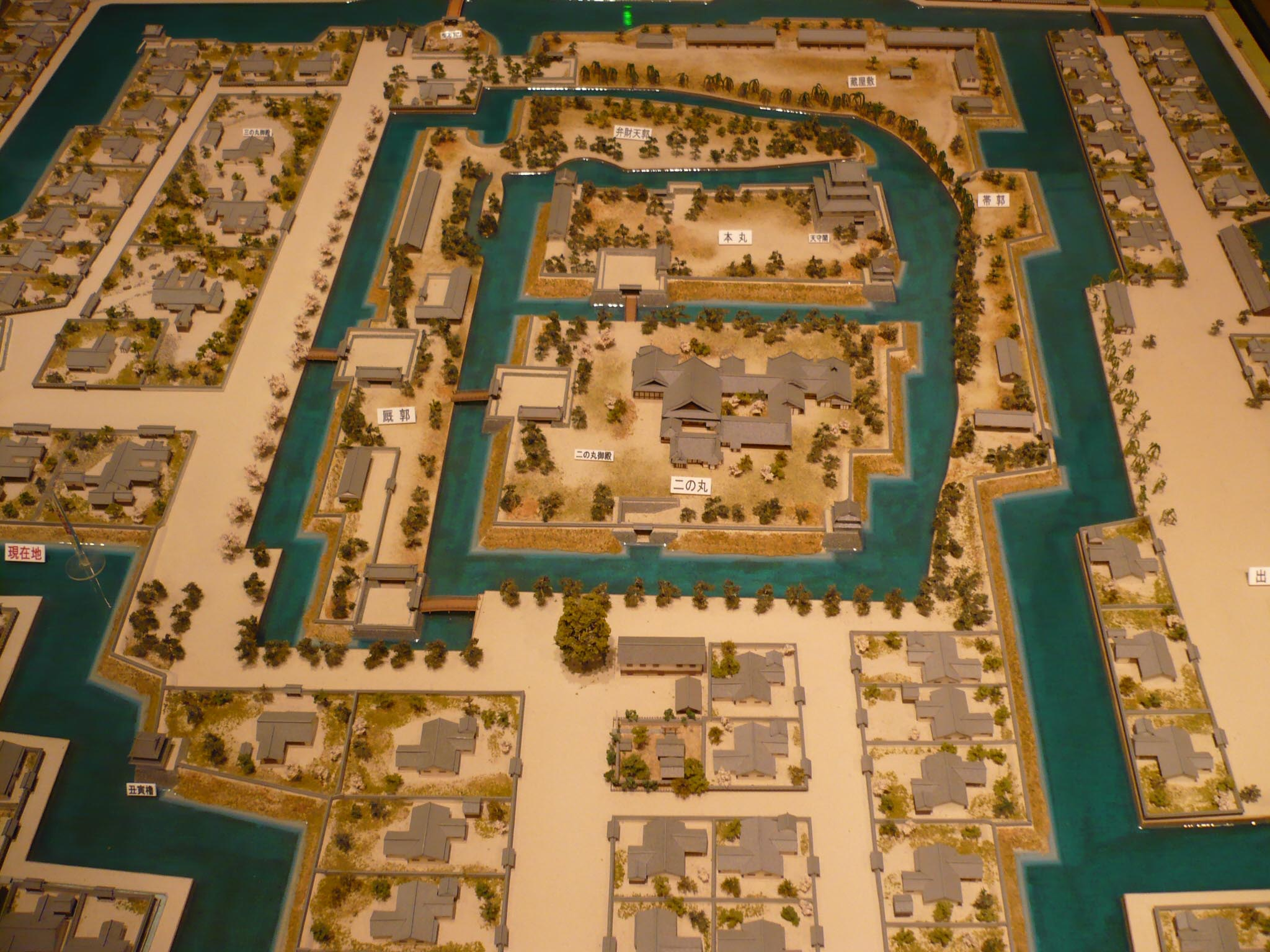
Diorama of Takatsuki Castle

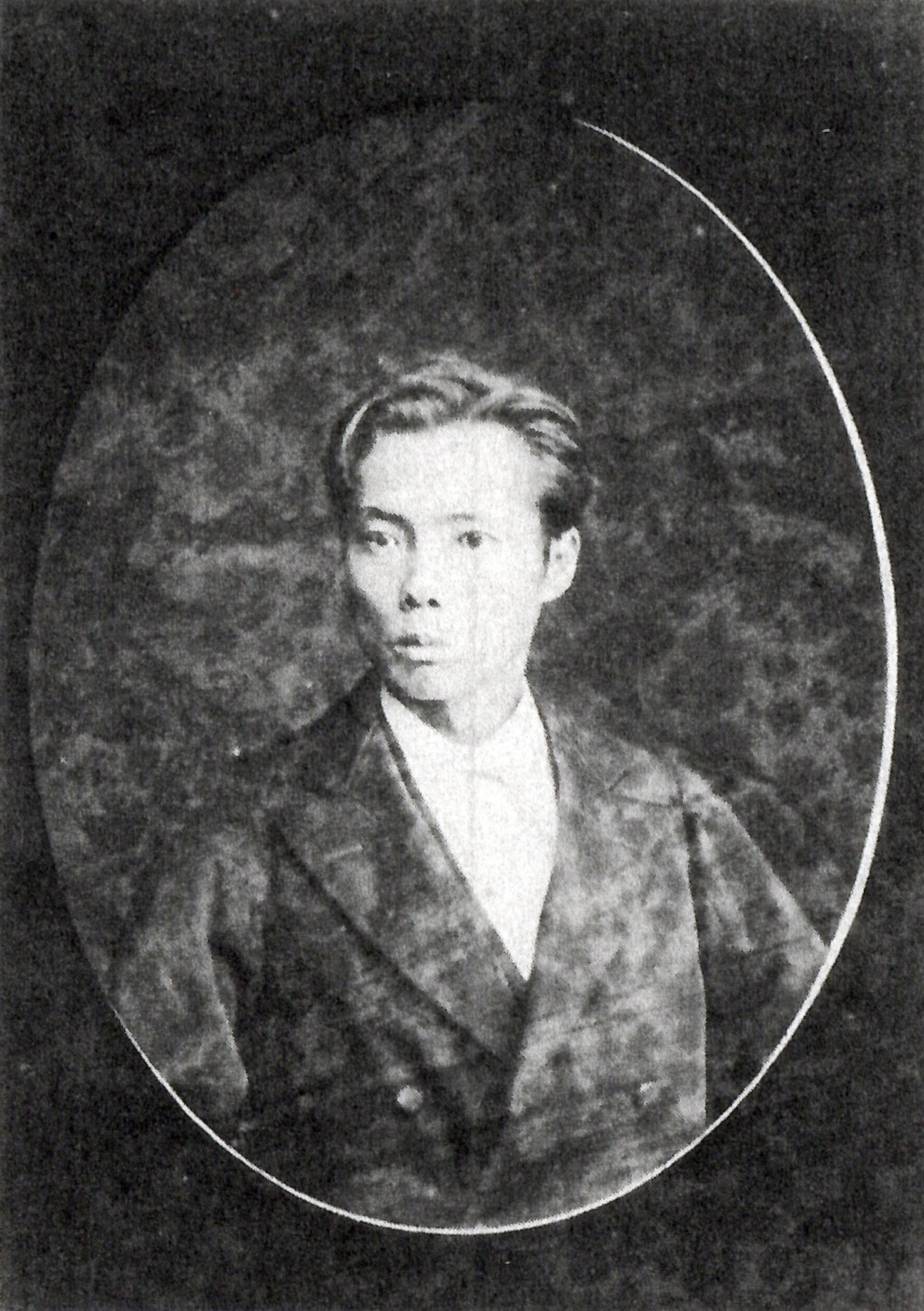
Nagai Naomasa

Takatsuki Domain (高槻藩, Takatsuki-han) was a feudal domain under the Tokugawa shogunate of Edo period Japan, located in Settsu Province in what is now the northern portion of modern-day Osaka Prefecture. It was centered around Takatsuki Castle, which is located in what is now the city of Takatsuki, Osaka.

== History ==
During the Sengoku period, Takatsuki was ruled by Takayama Ukon, who served Oda Nobunaga and Toyotomi Hideyoshi. Following Hideyoshi's persecution of the Kirishitan religion, the area was awarded as a 30,000 koku domain to Shinjo Naomori. Following the 1600 Battle of Sekigahara, he was dispossessed. In 1615, Naito Nobumasa was transferred to Takatsuki from Nagahama Domain in Ōmi Province and his kokudaka was set at 40,000 koku by the Tokugawa shogunate. Naito Nobumasa repaired Takatsuki Castle and its jōkamachi before being reassigned to Fushimi Castle in Yamashiro Province in 1617. The domain then passed through a large number of changes in control over a short period of time. Toki Sadayoshi was transferred from Moriya in Shimōsa Province in 1617 with the kokudaka of the domain reduced to 20,000 koku, but his son Toki Moriyuki was reduced to hatamoto status and returned to Moriya in 1619. He was replaced by Matsudaira Ienobu from Kasahara in Mikawa Province, but he was transferred to Sakura Domain in Shimōsa in 1635. Okabe Nobukatsu ruled from 1635 to his transfer to Kishiwada Domain in Izumi Province in 1640 and the domain was reassigned to Matsudaira Ienobu's second son, Matsudaira Yasunobu until his transfer to Sasayama Domain in Tanba Province in 1649. The domain then went to Nagai Naokiyo, who transferred his seat from Nagaoka in Yamashiro Province. His descendants would continue to rule Takatsuki until the Meiji Restoration.

In 1871, due to the abolition of the han system, Takatsuki Domain became “Takatsuki Prefecture”, and was later incorporated into Osaka Prefecture.

== Holdings at the end of the Edo period ==
As with most domains in the han system, Takatsuki Domain consisted of several discontinuous territories calculated to provide the assigned kokudaka, based on periodic cadastral surveys and projected agricultural yields.

- Settsu Province
  - 2 villages in Sumiyoshi District
  - 29 villages in Shimashimo District
  - 41 villages in Shimakami District
  - 1 village in Nose District
- Tanba Province
- 15 villages in Kuwana District
- Kawachi Province
- 3 villages in Matta District

== List of daimyō ==
#	Name	Tenure	Courtesy title	Court Rank	kokudaka
Naito clan, 1615-1617 (Fudai)
1	Naito Nobumasa| (内藤信正)	1615 - 1617	Kii-no-kami (紀伊守)	Junior 5th Rank, Lower Grade (従五位下)	40,000 koku
Toki clan, 1617-1619 (Fudai)
1	Toki Sadayoshi (土岐定義)	1617 - 1619	Yamashiro-no-kami (山城守)	Junior 5th Rank, Lower Grade (従五位下)	20,000 koku
2	Toki Sadayuki (土岐頼行)	1619 - 1619	Yamashiro-no-kami (山城守)	Junior 5th Rank, Lower Grade (従五位下)	20,000 koku
Katahara-Matsudaira clan, 1619-165 (Fudai)
1	Matsudaira Ienobu (松平家信)	1619 - 1635	Kii-no-kami (紀伊守)	Junior 4th Rank, Lower Grade (従四位下)	20,000 koku
Okabe clan, 1635-1640 (Fudai)
1	Okabe Nobukatsu(岡部宣勝)	1635 - 1640	Mino-no-kami (美濃守)	Junior 5th Rank, Lower Grade (従五位下)	50,000 koku
Katahara-Matsudaira clan, 1640-1649 (Fudai)
1	Matsudaira Yasunobu (松平康信)	1640 - 1649	Wakasa-no-kami (若狭守)	Junior 4th Rank, Lower Grade (従四位下)	36,000 koku
Nagai clan, 1649-1871 (Fudai)
1	Nagai Naokiyo (永井直清)	1649 - 1671	Hyuga-no-kami (日向守)	Junior 5th Rank, Lower Grade (従五位下)	36,000 koku
2	Nagai Naotoki (永井直時)	1671 - 1680	Ichi-no-kami (市正)	Junior 5th Rank, Lower Grade (従五位下)	36,000 koku
3	Nagai Naotane (永井直種)	1680 - 1695	Hyuga-no-kami (日向守)	Junior 5th Rank, Lower Grade (従五位下)	36,000 koku
4	Nagai Naotatsu (永井直達)	1695 - 1706	Hyuga-no-kami (日向守)	Junior 5th Rank, Lower Grade (従五位下)	36,000 koku
5	Nagai Naohide (永井直英)	1706 - 1715	Bingo-no-kami (備後守)	Junior 5th Rank, Lower Grade (従五位下)	36,000 koku
6	Nagai Naozane (永井直期)	1715 - 1748	Hida-no-kami (飛騨守)	Junior 5th Rank, Lower Grade (従五位下)	36,000 koku
7	Nagai Naoyuki (永井直行)	1748 - 1758	Omi-no-kami (近江守)	Junior 5th Rank, Lower Grade (従五位下)	36,000 koku
8	Nagai Naoyoshi (永井直珍)	1758 - 1770	Hida-no-kami (飛騨守)	Junior 5th Rank, Lower Grade (従五位下)	36,000 koku
9	Nagai Naonobu (永井直進)	1771 - 1809	Hyuga-no-kami (日向守)	Junior 5th Rank, Lower Grade (従五位下)	36,000 koku
10	Nagai Naotomo (永井直与)	1809 - 1842	Hida-no-kami (飛騨守)	Junior 5th Rank, Lower Grade (従五位下)	36,000 koku
11	Nagai Naoteru (永井直輝)	1842 - 1861	Hida-no-kami (飛騨守)	Junior 5th Rank, Lower Grade (従五位下)	36,000 koku
12	Nagai Naotsura (永井直矢)	1861 - 1865	Hida-no-kami (飛騨守)	Junior 5th Rank, Lower Grade (従五位下)	36,000 koku
13	Nagai Naomasa (永井直諒)	1865 - 1871	Hyuga-no-kami (日向守)	Junior 5th Rank, Lower Grade (従五位下)	36,000 koku

== See also ==
- List of Han
- Abolition of the han system
