= Hōsen-in =

Buddhist temple in Kyoto Prefecture

Coordinates: 35°7′16.9″N 135°50′2.4″E

- 宝泉院
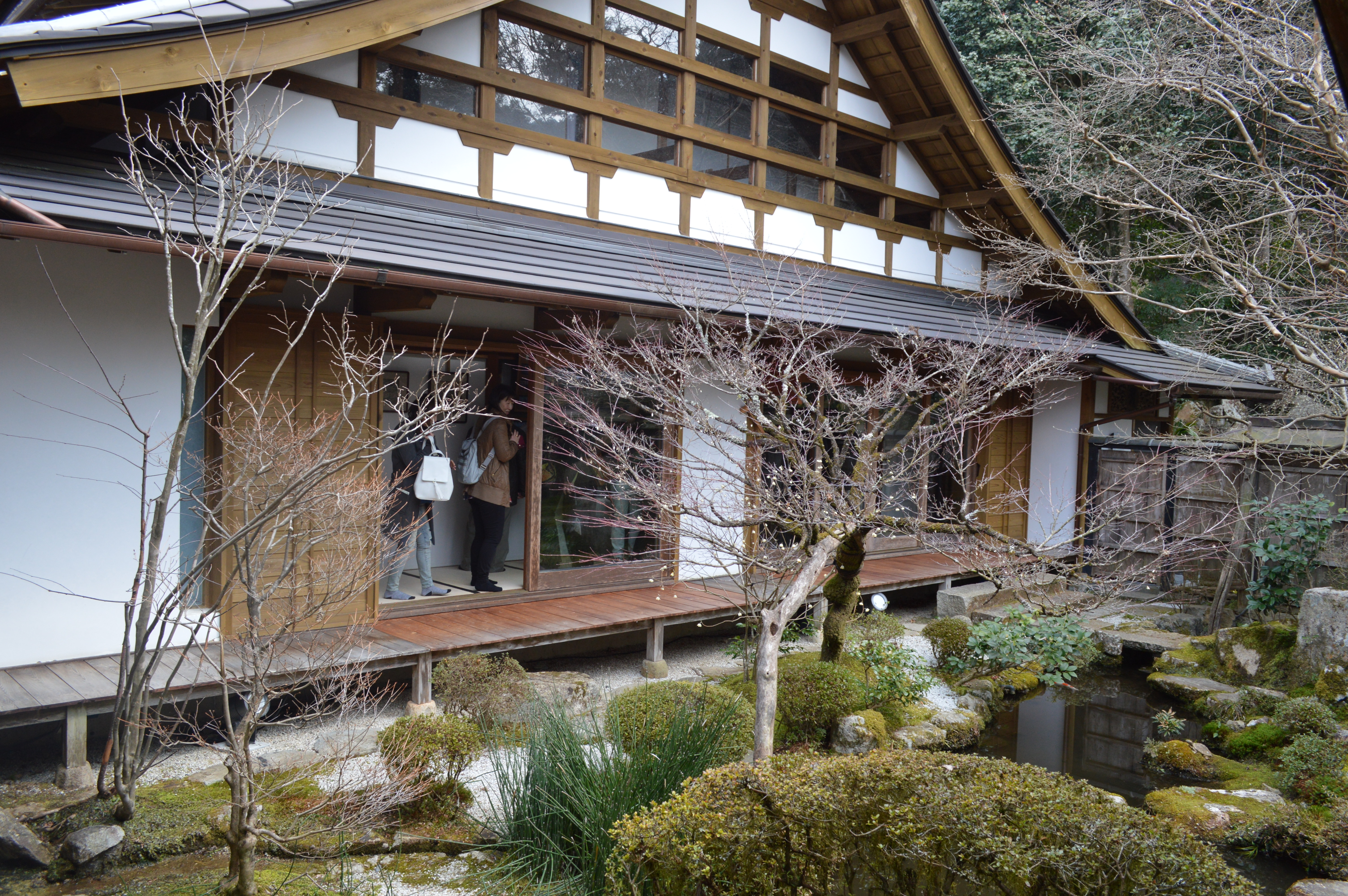

Religion
- Affiliation: Buddhism

Location
- Location: 187 Oharashōrin'inchō, Sakyō-ku, Kyoto-shi, Kyoto-fu
- Interactive map of Hōsen-in

Architecture
- Completed: 1012 (Chōwa 2)

Website
- http://www.hosenin.net/

Hōsen-in (宝泉院) is a Buddhist temple of the Tendai-shū, located in Sakyō-ku of Kyoto-shi, in the prefecture of Kyoto, Japan. It is specified as a natural monument by the Kyoto government.

== History ==
It was built in 1012 under the reign of Emperor Sanjō in the imperial year Chōwa 2. Its original purpose was to serve as temple quarters for priests from the nearby Shōrin-in temple.

== Structure ==
One of the rooms features a blood stained ceiling that was originally a floorpiece from Fushimi Castle. The blood is from Torii Mototada, Tokugawa Ieyasu's retainer, and several other men who committed seppuku when the castle they were garrisoned in as being overrun by Ishida Mitsunari's forces during the siege of Fushimi castle. This battle delayed the Ishida forces, which gave Tokugawa Ieyasu time to prepare for the Battle of Sekigahara and eventually unify Japan under the Tokugawa Shogunate. Thus, Torii Mototada's act of valor is honored through having the bloody floorpiece serve as a piece of Hōsen-in.

== Visiting ==
At the entrance, along with paying the fee, guests are given a ticket that can be used for refreshments at the end. Guests are passed through a washitsu featuring such sights including a five-leafed pine. This temple also features a garden called Hōrakuen, or "Treasure Paradise" At the end, the refreshments ticket can be exchanged for green tea and some light snacks.

== See also ==
- Sanzen-in
- Shōmyō
- Suikinkutsu
