= Suwahara Castle =

Castle ruins in Shimoda, Japan

- 諏訪原城
- Shimada, Shizuoka, Japan
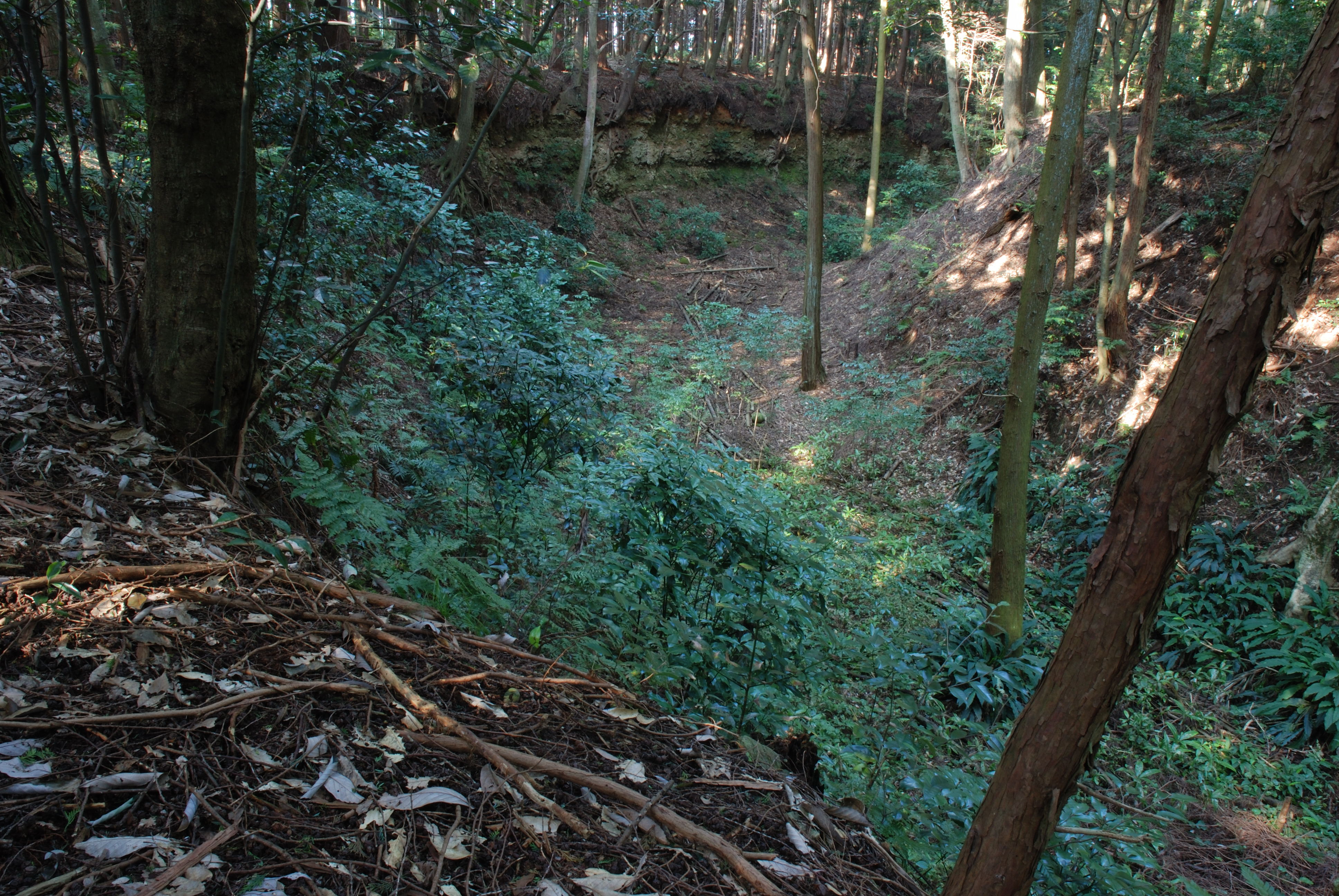
- Dry moat (Mikazuki moat) of Suwahara Castle

Site information
- Type: yamashiro-style Japanese castle
- Controlled by: Takeda clan, Tokugawa clan
- Condition: ruins

Location
- Suwahara Castle Suwahara Castle (Japan)
- Coordinates: 34°49′4.94″N 138°7′11.4″E

Site history
- Built: 1573
- Built by: Baba Nobuharu?

Garrison information
- Past commanders: Imagawa Ujizane, Matsudaira Ietada

Suwahara Castle (諏訪原城, Suwahara-jō) was a Sengoku period yamashiro-style Japanese castle located in the Kanaya neighborhood of the city of Shimada, Shizuoka prefecture, Japan. The ruins have been protected as a National Historic Site since 1975.

== Overview ==
Suwahara Castle is located at the edge of cliff in the northern part of the Makinohara Plateau, commanding the location where the Ōi River crosses the Tōkaidō highway. It has an elevation of about 200 meters. At the time the castle was constructed, the river was closer to the cliff face, so that the castle was strategically important for controlling both the highway and the river. The inner bailey of the castle is a square-shaped area, 100 meters on a side, which is backed against a steep cliff. Two enclosures spread in concentric circles from the inner bailey, each protected by a moat and wall. The second bailey is approximately 100 meters long by 80 meters die, and the third bailey is approximately 200 meters long by 80 meters wide. In the middle of both the second and third bailey is a large semi-circular fort, called an "Umadashi", which is a construct unique to Takeda clan designs. Each "umadashi" is a 40 meter semi-circular wall, protected by a dry moat, with a gate on either end, from which the defenders could protect the flanks of the wall, the gates, and to stage counterattacks. total size of the castle was about 300 meter long and 200 meter wide.

== History ==
Following the death of the warlord Takeda Shingen, his son Takeda Katsuyori attempted to pursue his father's legacy by pursuing a highly aggressive policy against Mikawa-based Tokugawa Ieyasu. As part of this campaign, Katsuyori ordered his general Baba Nobuharu to construct a castle at this location in 1573 in order the facilitate the Takeda invasion of Tōtōmi Province and capture of Takatenjin Castle. It was named after a Suwa shrine brought to this site by the Takeda clan from Shinano Province, as the Suwa kami were the tutelary kami of the Takeda.

In 1575, following their victory at the Battle of Nagashino, the Tokugawa swept through Tōtōmi Province, and overran Suwahara Castle. The castle was renamed Makino Castle and used as the Tokugawa base of operations against the Takeda in the Siege of Takatenjin Castle in 1581. After Tokugawa clan was relocated to the Kantō region by Toyotomi Hideyoshi in 1590, Suwahara Castle was abandoned.

Despite having been used for only less than 10 years, original plan of this castle clearly remains. The castle was listed as one of the Continued Top 100 Japanese Castles in 2017. The site is about a 30-minute walk from Kanaya Station on the JR East Tokaido Main Line.

== See also ==
- List of Historic Sites of Japan (Shizuoka)
