= Matsudaira Tadayoshi =

Fourth son of Tokugawa Ieyasu (1580–1607)

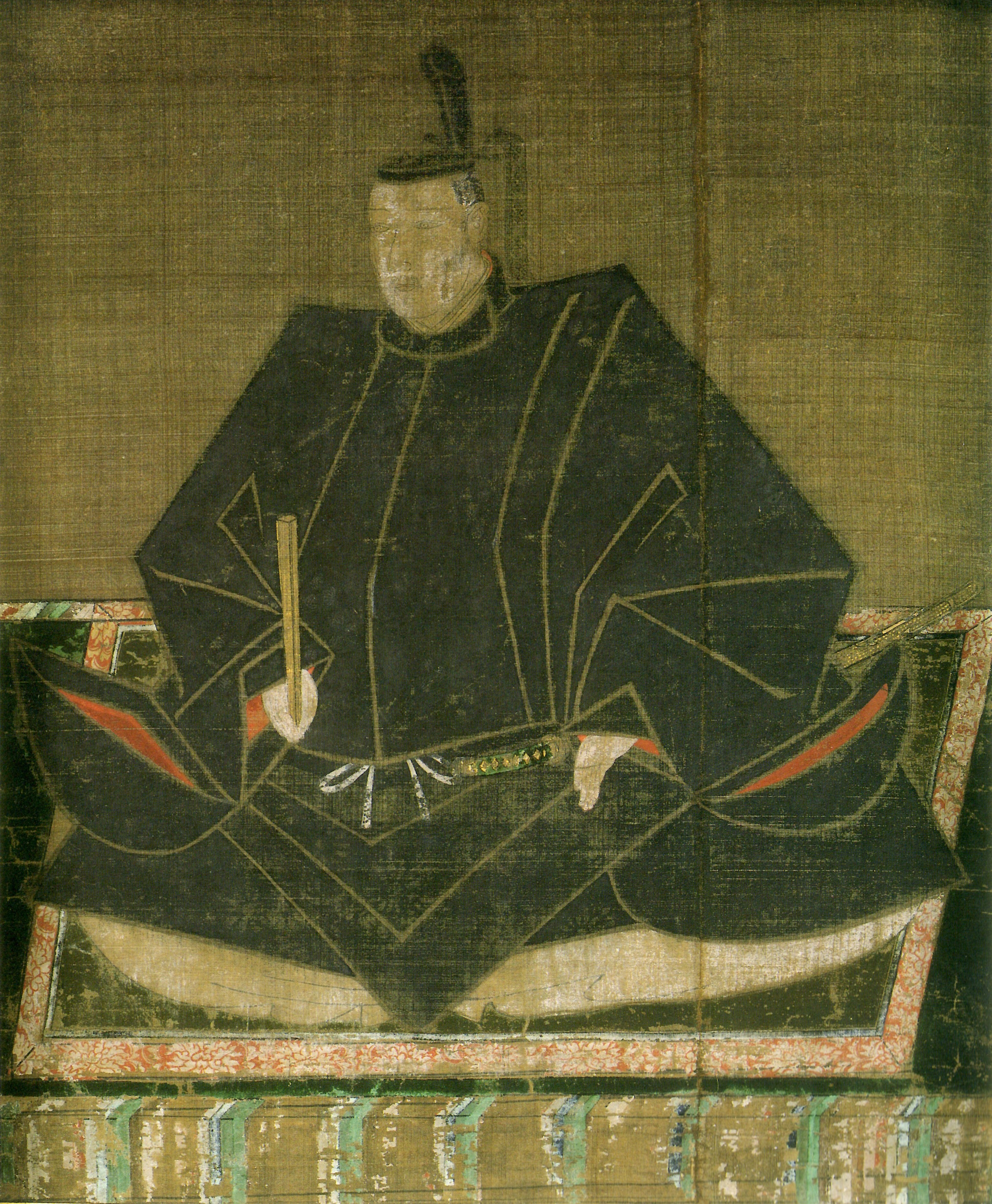
Matsudaira Tadayoshi

Matsudaira Tadayoshi (松平 忠吉; c. 1580 – 1607) was a Japanese military commander and feudal lord during the early Edo period. He was the fourth son of Tokugawa Ieyasu with his concubine Saigo-no-Tsubone. His childhood name was Fukumatsumaru (福松丸).

== Early life ==
When his mother died, he and his brother were adopted by Acha no Tsubone (1555-1637). His full brother, Tokugawa Hidetada, was the second shōgun.

== Lordships ==
Tadayoshi was adopted by his paternal uncle Matsudaira Ietada and succeeded him as the second lord of Oshi Domain.

In the Battle of Sekigahara, he was attended by Ii Naomasa and was therefore at the forefront of the fighting. In the midst of the battle, he was shot by an Ishida gunner, but survived with a bullet wound.

Tadayoshi became lord of Kiyosu Castle, the most important fortification in Owari, where he was given 52-thousand koku.

== Personal life and death ==
His wife was the daughter of Ii Naomasa. Tadayoshi died in 1607 without having produced a son.

Three of his retainers committed junshi following his death. The events surrounding his death including the suicide of his followers are reported in Kenmotsu sōshi (監物草子) written in the Kan'ei era.

He was buried in Shinnyo-ji in Kakegawa.

== Family ==
- Father: Tokugawa Ieyasu
- Mother: Saigō-no-Tsubone
- Adopted Father: Matsudaira Ietada (Fukozu)
- Wife: Ii Masako
- Child: 1

Preceded by Matsudaira Ietada (Fukozu)	Lord of Oshi; 1592-1600	Succeeded by Ownership reverting to direct Tokugawa Shogunate control (Tenryo)
