= Kasuya Takenori =

Japanese samurai

- 糟屋 武則
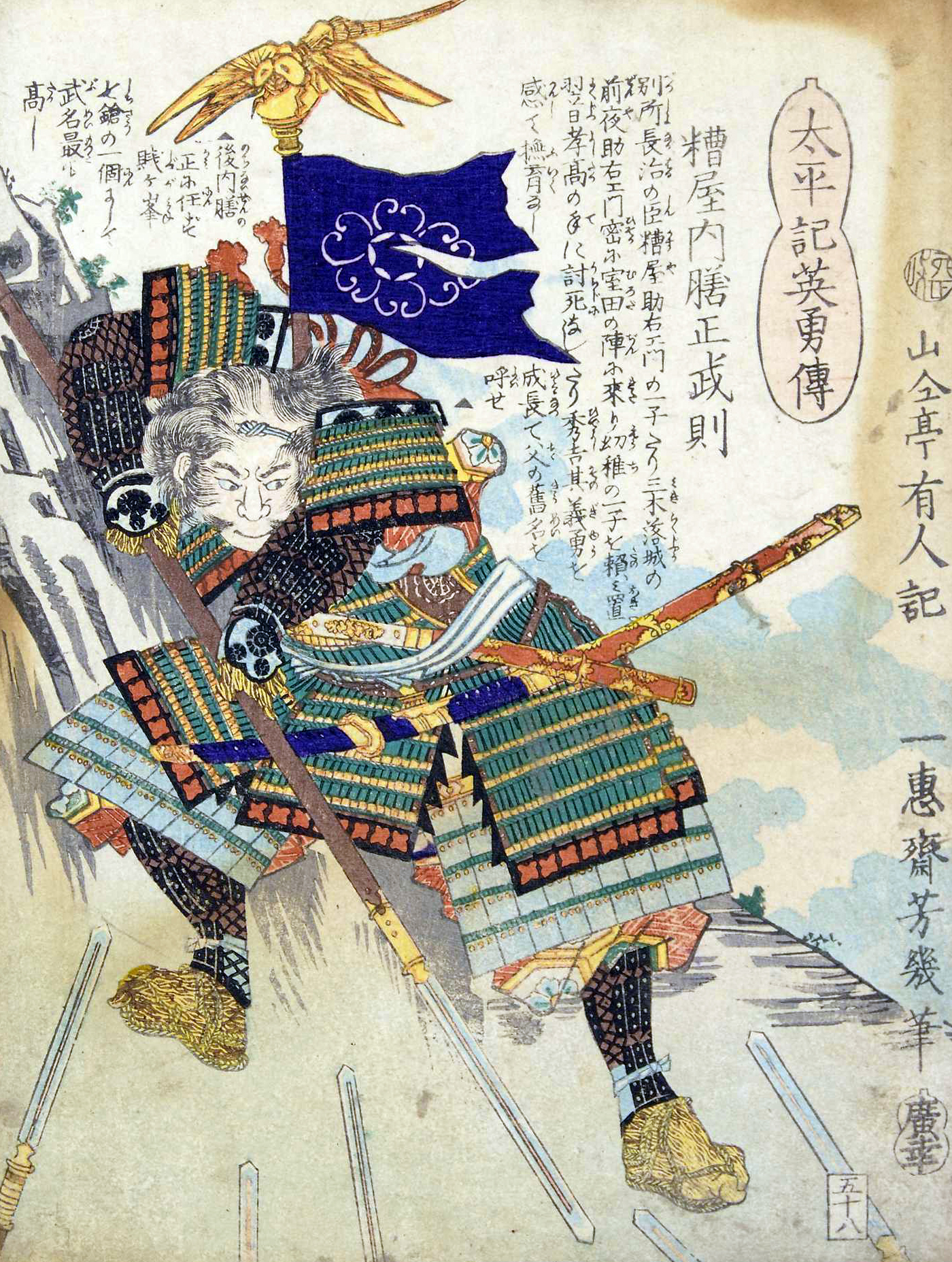
- Portrait of Kasuya Takenori from Utagawa Yoshiiku's Heroes of the Taiheiki
- Born: 1562
- Died: 1607 (aged 44–45)
- Military career
- Allegiance: Bessho clan Toyotomi clan Western Army; Tokugawa shogunate
- Rank: Hatamoto
- Commands: Kakogawa castle
- Conflicts: Chūgoku campaign Battle of Shizugatake; Korean campaign Siege of Fushimi

Kasuya Takenori (糟屋 武則; 1562–1607) was a Japanese samurai of the Azuchi-Momoyama Period, in the service of the Toyotomi clan. He was the second son of Kasuya Tadayasu, a retainer of the Bessho clan of Harima Province. He held the title of Naizen no Kami (内膳正).

Following the Chūgoku campaign, Takenori became a page of Toyotomi Hideyoshi due to the recommendation of Kuroda Kanbei.

In 1583, Takenori achieved notoriety due to his distinguished combat at the Battle of Shizugatake, where he was known as one of the Seven Spears of Shizugatake, and for this distinction he received a stipend of 3,000 koku from Hideyoshi. Also served in the Korean campaign, and subsequently was granted Kakogawa Castle in Harima Province.

In 1600, at the Battle of Sekigahara, he was to be the only one out of the "Seven Spears" to side with Ishida Mitsunari's "Western" army, and joined in the attack on Fushimi Castle. While his holdings were confiscated after the battle, his family was later allowed a 500 koku stipend, and was given the status of hatamoto under the Tokugawa family's care.

Despite this slight restoration of family fortunes, soon after Takenori's death the Kasuya line would end.

== Legacy ==
Today, Takenori's extra-long yari is on display at the Nagahama City Museum, in Nagahama Castle.

While greatly famous himself, Takenori had other famous relatives. His brother was fellow Sengoku-era warrior Kasuya Tomomasa, while his nephew was the famed archer and Aizu domain retainer Kasuya Takenari (糟屋 武成).
