= Matsudaira Ietada (Katahara) =

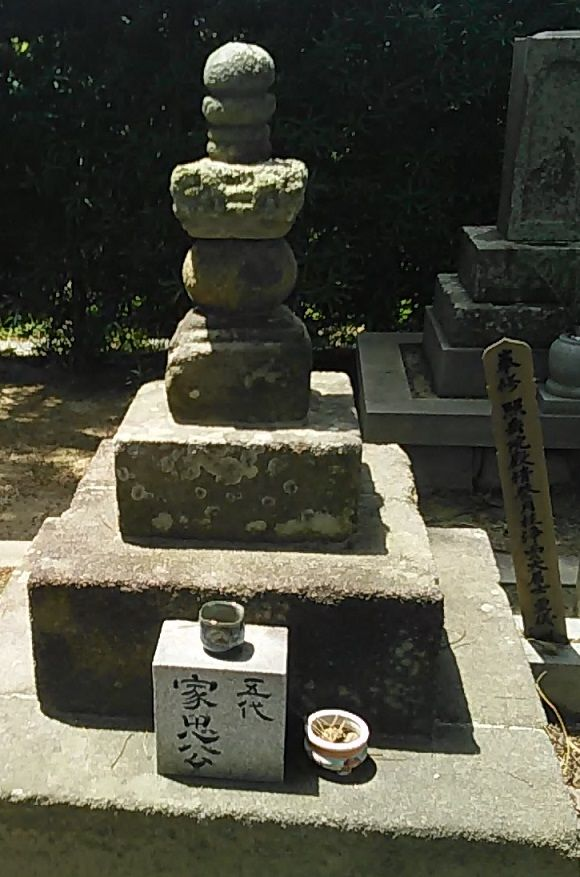
The grave of Matsudaira Ietada

This is about a member of the Kii-Matsudaira. For others of the same name, see Matsudaira Ietada.

Matsudaira Ietada (松平 家忠; 1548–1582) was a Japanese samurai of the Sengoku period and the 5th daimyō (lord) of the Katahara branch of the Matsudaira clan, which was based in Katahara Castle, Mikawa Province (the ruins of the castle are in what is now Gamagōri, Aichi). Ietada was also known as Matsudaira Matashichiro, and had the nickname Kii no kami, or "The Defender of Kii" (紀伊守).

Matsudaira Ietada was the son of the 4th daimyō, Matsudaira Iehiro (died 1571) and Lady Osai, daughter of Mizuno Tadamasa. Lady Osai was the sister of Lady Odai, the mother of Tokugawa Ieyasu, thus he and Ietada were cousins. Ietada succeeded his father to become the 5th lord of the Katahara branch of the Matsudaira clan, based in Katahara Castle, Mikawa Province.

Ietada married a daughter of Sakai Masachika. He was succeeded by their son, Matsudaira Ienobu (1565–1638), the 6th daimyō of the Katahara-Matsudaira clan.

| Preceded by Matsudaira Iehiro | 5th Daimyō of Katahara (Katahara-Matsudaira); 1571–1582 | Succeeded by Matsudaira Ienobu |
| Preceded by none | 1st Daimyō of Kii (Katahara-Matsudaira); 1575–1582 | Succeeded by none |
