= Matsudaira Ietada =

Matsudaira Ietada was the name of at least two samurai who lived in the Sengoku period of Japan:

- Matsudaira Ietada (Fukōzu), 1555–1600, samurai who adopted Matsudaira Tadayoshi, son of Tokugawa Ieyasu and Lady Saigo
- Matsudaira Ietada (Katahara), 1548–1582, samurai and cousin of Tokugawa Ieyasu
