= Matsudaira Ienobu =

Japanese samurai (1565-1638)

Matsudaira Ienobu (松平 家信) (1565 – February 27, 1638), also known as Matsudaira Ietomi (松平家副), was a Japanese samurai of the Sengoku period through early Edo period, who served the Tokugawa clan and later became a daimyō. He was the son of Matsudaira Ietada, and became the 6th head of the Katahara-Matsudaira clan. From an early age, he served Tokugawa Ieyasu, taking part in the major campaigns of the Tokugawa clan. He saw action against the Takeda clan in 1582, and succeeded to family headship in the same year, following the death of his father. In 1584, under the command of Sakai Tadatsugu, Ienobu fought at the Battle of Komaki and Nagakute, taking the head of the enemy general Noro Magoichirō.

After the Siege of Odawara (1590), Ienobu followed Ieyasu during the latter's move into the Kantō region, and was given the fief of Goi, worth 5000 koku. He was later returned to his old fief of Katahara, then transferred to Takatsuki in 1619, and then to Sakura in 1635. With the move to Sakura, his income rose to 40,000 koku.

Ienobu died in early 1638, at age 74; he was buried at Kōchū-ji temple in what is now Sakura, Chiba. The family headship was succeeded by his son Yasunobu.

Preceded by Matsudaira Ietada	6th Daimyō of Katahara (Katahara-Matsudaira); 1618–1619	Succeeded by none
Preceded by Tsuchiya Yoriyuki	1st Daimyō of Takatsuki (Katahara-Matsudaira); 1619–1635	Succeeded by Okabe Nobukatsu
Preceded by Ishikawa Tadafusa	1st Daimyō of Sakura (Katahara-Matsudaira); 1635–1638	Succeeded by Matsudaira Yasunobu
