= Kantō region =

Region of Japan

Kantō region 関東地方
- Region
- The Kantō region in comparison to the rest of Japan
- Interactive map of Kantō region
- Country: Japan

Area
  - Total: 32,423.9 km^{2} (12,518.9 sq mi)

Population (October 1, 2025)
  - Total: 43,509,179
  - Density: 1,341.89/km^{2} (3,475.47/sq mi)

GDP (2022)
  - Total: JP￥248.036 trillion US$1.832 trillion
- Time zone: UTC+09:00 (JST)

Geofeatures map of Kantō

The Kantō region (関東地方, Kantō chihō; Japanese pronunciation: [kä́ǹ.tò̞ò̞, kä̀ń.tó̞ó̞ c̟͡ɕí.hò̞ò̞, -c̟͡ɕi̥.hò̞ò̞, -c̟͡ɕi̥.hó̞ò̞, kä́ń.tó̞ó̞-]) is a geographical region of Honshu, the largest island of Japan. It is commonly defined as the region that includes the Greater Tokyo Area and seven prefectures: Chiba, Gunma, Ibaraki, Kanagawa, Saitama, Tochigi, and Tokyo. The Kantō Plain makes up just over 45 percent of its land area. The rest consists of hills and mountains that form land borders with other regions of Japan.

Since the Kantō region contains Tokyo, the capital and largest city of Japan, the region is considered the center of Japan's politics and economy. According to the official census on October 1, 2025, by the Statistics Bureau of Japan, the population was 43,509,179, amounting to greater than one-third of Japan's total population.

== Other definitions ==
The Kantō regional governors' association (関東地方知事会, Kantō chihō chijikai) assembles the prefectural governors of Ibaraki, Tochigi, Gunma, Saitama, Chiba, Tokyo, Kanagawa, Yamanashi, Nagano, and Shizuoka.

The Kantō Regional Development Bureau (関東地方整備局, Kantō chihō seibi-kyoku) of the Ministry of Land, Infrastructure, Transport and Tourism in the national government is responsible for eight prefectures generally (Ibaraki, Tochigi, Gunma, Saitama, Chiba, Tokyo, Kanagawa, Yamanashi) and parts of the waterways in two others (Nagano and Shizuoka).

The Kantō Bureau of Economy, Trade and Industry (関東経済産業局, Kantō keizai-sangyō-kyoku) is responsible for eleven prefectures: Ibaraki, Tochigi, Gunma, Saitama, Chiba, Tokyo, Kanagawa, Niigata, Yamanashi, Nagano and Shizuoka.

In the police organization of Japan, the National Police Agency's supervisory office for Kantō (関東管区警察局, Kantō kanku keisatsu-kyoku) is responsible for the Prefectural police departments of Ibaraki, Tochigi, Gunma, Saitama, Chiba, Kanagawa, Niigata, Yamanashi, Nagano and Shizuoka. Tokyo is not part of Kantō or any NPA region, its police has a dedicated liaison office with the national agency of its own.

== Geography ==
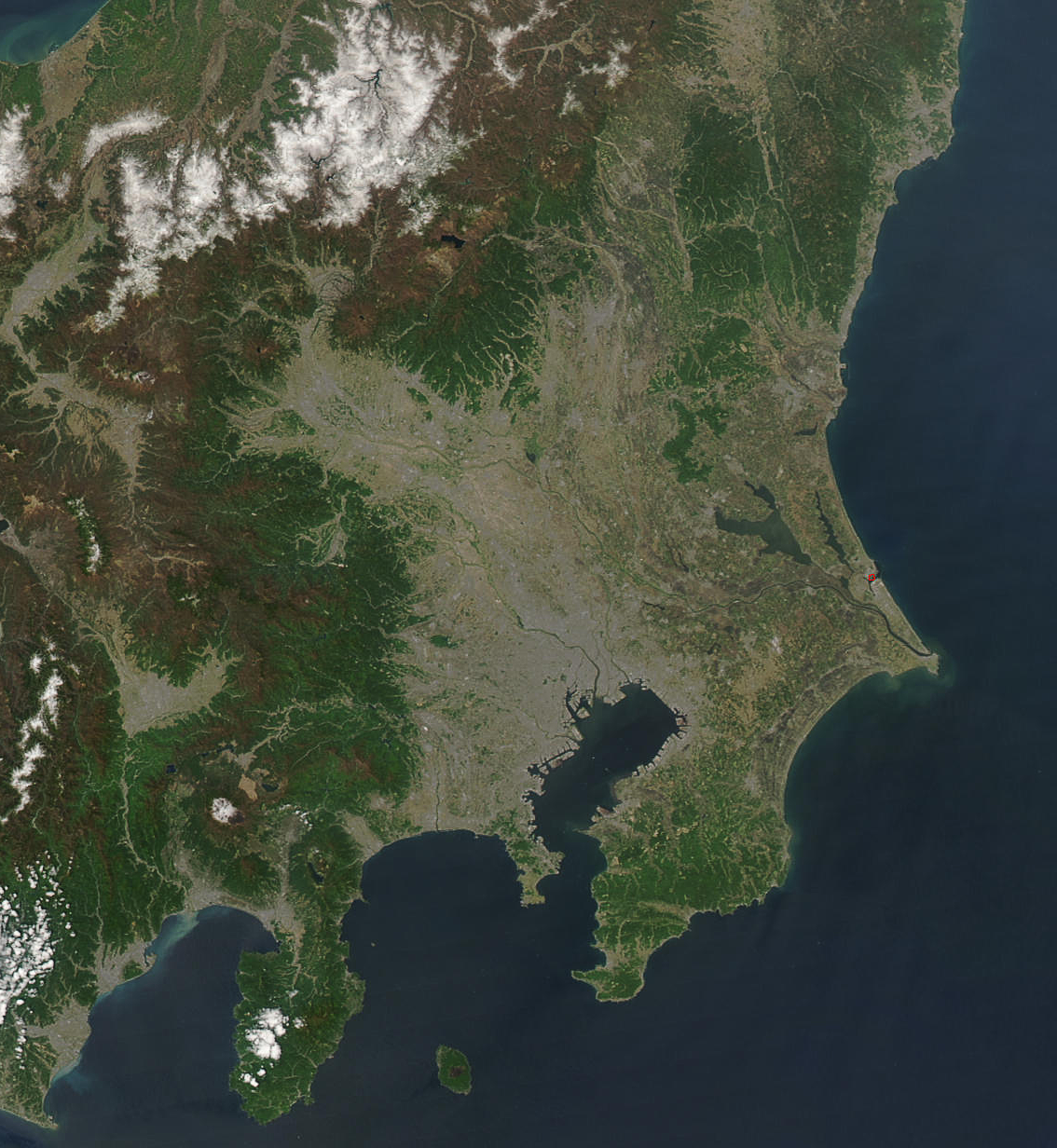
Kantō region satellite photo

Tokyo gate bridge

The surface geology of the Kantō Plain is the Quaternary alluvium and diluvium. The low mountain vegetation at an altitude of about 500 to 900 m in and around the plain is an evergreen broad-leaved forest zone. The distribution height range of laurel forests is 900 m in Hakone, about 800 m in Tanzawa and Takao, about 700 m in Okutama, Oku Musashi and Oku Chichibu, about 600 m in Nishijoshu, Akagiyama, Ashio Mountains and Tsukuba Mountains and about 500 m in Kitage and Nasu Mountains.

Over the evergreen broad-leaved forest are deciduous broad-leaved forests such as beech, birch, and Quercus crispula. In addition, coniferous forests such as Abies veitchii and Betula ermanii spread above the deciduous broad-leaved forest from an altitude of about 1100 m higher than the lower limit of the deciduous broad-leaved forest.

Mountains are spread out such as the Taishaku Mountains, Mt. Takahara, Mt. Nasu, and Mt. Yamizo. The Kantō Plain, which is the largest plain in Japan. Just north of the Enna Hills is Japan's largest alluvial fan Nasuno at the foot of Mt. The Kujukuri Plain. The southern part of Chiba Prefecture is the Boso hills. The area around Kasumigaura in Ibaraki Prefecture is the Joso plateau and Hitachi plateau. Gunma Prefecture and the Chichibu region of Saitama Prefecture are basins. Rivers such as the Arakawa and Edo rivers pour into Tokyo Bay, and the Kinugawa and Tone rivers flow into the Pacific Ocean in Inubōsaki.

Tokyo Bay is surrounded by the Boso Peninsula and the Miura Peninsula, facing the west side of Chiba Prefecture, a part of Tokyo and the east side of Kanagawa Prefecture, and borders the Pacific Ocean from Uraga Suido. The coastal area is an industrial area. The south side of Kanagawa Prefecture faces Sagami Bay and Sagami Nada. The southern coast of Ibaraki Prefecture faces Kashima Nada. The Sagami Trough, which was the epicenter of the two Kantō earthquakes, passes through Sagami Bay. Efforts are being made to take safety measures against earthquakes in various places.

The highest point is the summit of Mt. Nikko-Shirane (Mt. Oku-Shirane) on the border between Nikko City, Tochigi Prefecture and Katashina Village, Gunma Prefecture. It is the eighth highest point in Japan's prefectures. It is also the highest point north of Kantō (Kantō, Tōhoku, Hokkaido). The highest points of the prefectures are Mt. Sanpo (2,483 m) in Saitama, Mt. Kumotori (2,017 m) in Tokyo, Mt. Hiru (1,673 m) in Kanagawa, Mt. Yamizo (1,022 m) in Ibaraki, and Mt. Atago (408 m) in Chiba. Atagoyama in Chiba Prefecture is the lowest among the highest peaks in each prefecture.

The region experiences a humid subtropical climate with a summer to fall precipitation maximum (Cfa/Cwa).

== History ==
The name Kantō literally means "East of the Barrier". The name Kantō is nowadays generally considered to mean the region east (東) of the Hakone Barrier (箱根関). The antonym of Kantō is the Kansai region meaning "West of the Barrier", which lies in western Honshu and was the center of feudal Japan.

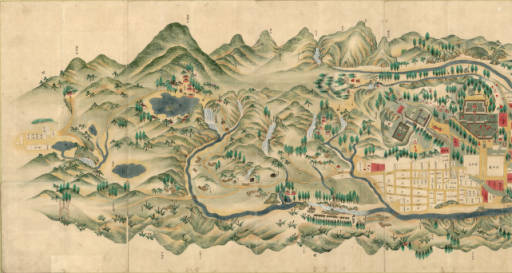
Mount Nikkō-Shirane in the Kantō region

Kamakura was the political capital during the Kamakura period, and it served as the seat of the Kamakura shogunate from 1185 to 1333, established by Minamoto no Yoritomo.

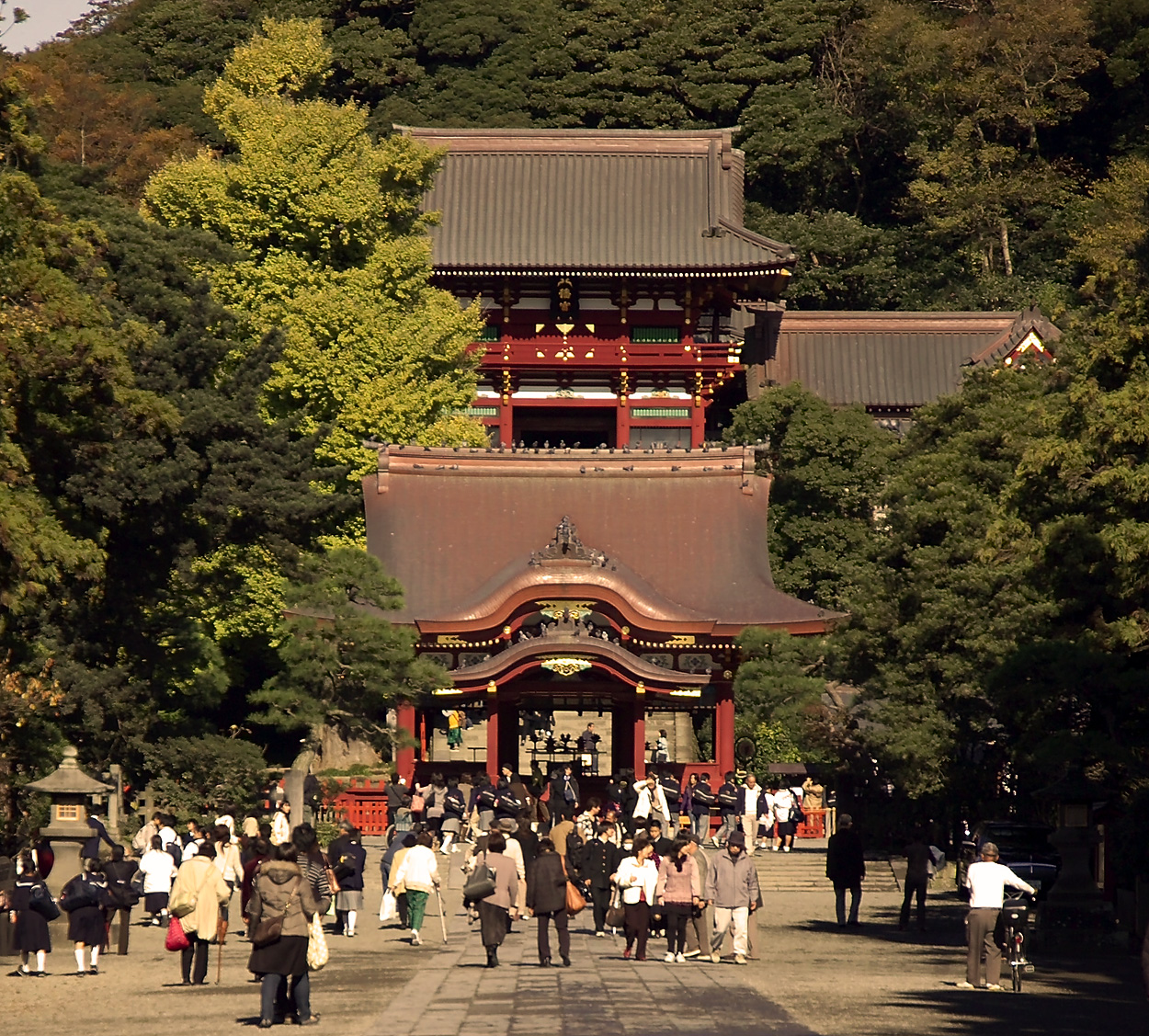
Tsurugaoka Hachiman in Kamakura

This was the first military government in Japan's history. Kamakura flourished until the fall of the Kamakura Shogunate, and its political functions returned to Kyoto in 1392.

In 1591, Tokugawa Ieyasu gave up control of his five provinces (Mikawa, Tōtōmi, Suruga, Shinano, and Kai) and moved all his soldiers and vassals to his new eight provinces in the Kantō region. The proclamation of this decision happened on the same day Toyotomi Hideyoshi, the de facto ruler of Japan at that time, entered Odawara castle following the surrender of the Hōjō clan after the Siege of Odawara (1590). The moment Ieyasu was appointed to rule Kantō, he immediately assigned his premier vassals to control large areas of the former Hōjō clan territories in the region. Historians such as Kawamura have interpreted these actions as supporting multiple goals: namely, bringing order the newly subdued population of the area while also guarding the eastern domains from the influence or threat from the Satomi clan, which had not yet submit to the rule of Toyotomi at that time. The governors of Kantō region under Ieyasu rule:

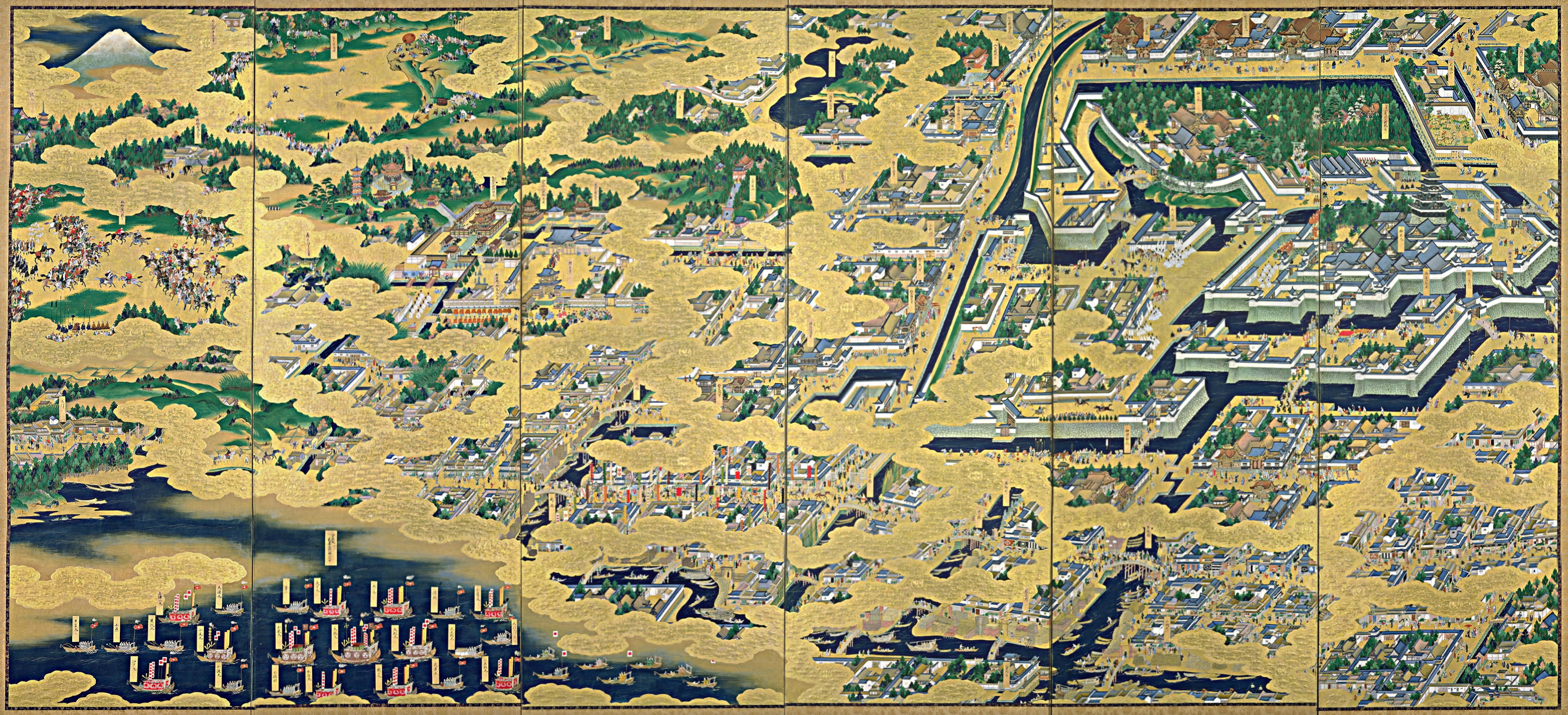
Edo depicted on a folding screen

| Province | Territory | Koku | Daimyo | Notes |
|---|---|---|---|---|
| Kōzuke Province | Minowa (later Takasaki Domain) | 120,000 | Ii Naomasa | |
| Kōzuke Province | Tatebayashi Domain | 100,000 | Sakakibara Yasumasa | |
| Kōzuke Province | Maebashi Domain | 33,000 | Hiraiwa Chikayoshi | |
| Kōzuke Province | Shiroi Domain | 20,000 | Honda Yasushige | The total domain revenue was 33,000. However, the 13,000 of its koku revenue were controlled by the father of Yasushige instead, Honda Hirotaka. |
| Kōzuke Province | Miyazaki (Obata Domain) | 30,000 | Okudaira Nobumasa | |
| Kōzuke Province | Fujioka | 30,000 | Yoda Yasukatsu (依田康勝) | |
| Kōzuke Province | Ogo Domain | 20,000 | Makino Yasunari | |
| Kōzuke Province | Yoshii Domain | 20,000 | Suganuma Sadatoshi | |
| Kōzuke Province | Sōja Domain | 12,000 | Suwa Yorimizu | |
| Kōzuke Province | Naba Domain | 10,000 | Matsudaira Ienobu | |
| Shimotsuke Province | Minagawa Domain | 10,000 | Minagawa Hiroteru | |
| Shimōsa Province | Yūki Domain & Tsuchiura Castle | 101,000 | Yuki Hideyasu | |
| Shimōsa Province | Yahagi Domain | 40,000 | Torii Mototada | |
| Shimōsa Province | Usui Domain | 30,000 | Sakai Ietsugu | |
| Shimōsa Province | Koga Domain | 30,000 | Ogasawara Hidemasa | |
| Shimōsa Province | Sekiyado Domain | 20,000 koku | Matsudaira Yasumoto | |
| Shimōsa Province | Yamasaki Domain | 12,000 | Okabe Nagamori | |
| Shimōsa Province | Ashido Domain | 10,000 | Kiso Yoshimasa | |
| Shimōsa Province | Moriya Domain | 10,000 | Suganuma Sadamasa | |
| Shimōsa Province | Tako Domain | 10,000 | Hoshina Masamitsu | |
| Shimōsa Province | Sakura Domain | 10,000 | Miura Shigenari (三浦重成) | |
| Shimōsa Province | Iwatomi Domain | 10,000 | Hōjō Ujikatsu | |
| Musashi Province | Iwatsuki Domain | 20,000 | Kōriki Kiyonaga | |
| Musashi Province | Kisai Domain | 20,000 | Matsudaira Yasushige | |
| Musashi Province | Kawagoe Domain | 10,000 koku | Sakai Shigetada | |
| Musashi Province | Musashi Komuro Domain | 10,000 | Ina Tadatsugu | |
| Musashi Province | Musashi Matsuyama Domain | 10,000 | Matsudaira Iehiro (松平家広) | |
| Musashi Province | Oshi Domain | 10,000 | Matsudaira Ietada | |
| Musashi Province | Hanyu Domain | 20,000 | Ōkubo Tadachika | |
| Musashi Province | Fukaya Domain | 10,000 | Matsudaira Yasutada | |
| Musashi Province | Tōhō Domain | 10,000 | Matsudaira Yasunaga | |
| Musashi Province | Honjō Domain | 10,000 | Ogasawara Nobumine (小笠原信嶺) | |
| Musashi Province | Aho Domain | 10,000 | Suganuma Sadamitsu | |
| Musashi Province | Hachimanyama Domain | 10,000 | Matsudaira Kiyomune (松平清宗) | |
| Kazusa Province | Ōtaki Domain | 100,000 | Honda Tadakatsu | Initially the capital of Domain were in Mangi castle |
| Kazusa Province | Kururi Domain | 30,000 | Ōsuga Tadamasa | |
| Kazusa Province | Sanuki Domain | 20,000 | Naitō Ienaga | |
| Kazusa Province | Naruto Domain | 20,000 | Ishikawa Yasumichi | |
| Sagami Province | Odawara Domain | 45,000 | Ōkubo Tadayo | |
| Sagami Province | Tamanawa Domain | 10,000 | Honda Masanobu | |
| Izu Province | Nirayama Domain | 10,000 | Naitō Nobunari | |

Ieyasu established his personal new seat of power on Edo town, which at that time was an underdeveloped town in Kantō. (Note: Historian Adam Sadler saw this step as the riskiest move Ieyasu ever made—to leave his home province and rely on the uncertain loyalty of the formerly Hōjō clan samurai in Kantō. In the end however, it worked out brilliantly for Ieyasu. He reformed the Kantō region, controlled and pacified the Hōjō samurai and improved the underlying economic infrastructure of the lands. Also, because Kantō was somewhat isolated from the rest of Japan, Ieyasu was able to ally with daimyos of north-east Japan such as Date Masamune, Mogami Yoshiaki, Satake Yoshishige and Nanbu Nobunao; he was also able to maintain a unique level of autonomy from Toyotomi Hideyoshi's rule. Within a few years, Ieyasu had become the second most powerful daimyo in Japan. It was said by anecdotal proverb that: "Ieyasu won the Empire by retreating." Historian Watanabe Daimon stated that the general opinion was that Ieyasu was reluctant about his transfer to Kantō. However, Daimon stated that thinking Ieyasu was reluctant was an opinion of a later era. Daimon suspected that Ieyasu actually saw this transfer positively as he realised a huge undeveloped potential by making Edo as his seat of power. Historian Andō yūichirō further added, the true intention of Hideyoshi transferring Ieyasu to Kantō was to weaken the power of the Tokugawa clan by moving them from their ancestral land in Mikawa, as he expected the former Hōjō vassals in Kantō would rebel against Ieyasu. However, this backfired as Ieyasu not only doubled the territories he control, but he also further added the bulk of new vassals in Kantō to the already impressive political and military power of Tokugawa regime as they already absorbed the army of Imagawa clan and Takeda clan before.)

In the Edo period, Kantō became the center of modern development. Within the Greater Tokyo Area and especially the Tokyo-Yokohama metropolitan area, the Kantō plain houses not only Japan's seat of government but also the nation's largest group of universities and cultural institutions, the greatest population and a large industrial zone. Although most of the Kantō plain is used for residential, commercial or industrial construction, some land is still farmed. Rice is the principal crop, although the zone around Tokyo and Yokohama has been landscaped to grow garden produce for the metropolitan market.

Operation Coronet, part of Operation Downfall, the proposed Allied invasion of Japan during World War II, was scheduled to land on the Kantō Plain.

=== Great earthquake of 1923 ===
A watershed moment of Japan's modern history took place in the late Taishō period: the Great Kantō earthquake of 1923. The quake, which claimed more than 100,000 lives and ravaged Greater Tokyo area, occurred at a time when Japan was still reeling from the economic recession in reaction to the high-flying years during World War I.

After the earthquake, many people in Kantō started creating art with different varieties of colors. They made art of earthquake and small towns to symbolize the small towns destroyed in the quake.

== Subdivisions ==
=== North and south ===
The most often used subdivision of the region is dividing it to "North Kantō" (北関東, Kita-Kantō), consisting of Ibaraki, Tochigi, and Gunma prefectures, and "South Kantō" (南関東, Minami-Kantō), consisting of Saitama (sometimes classified North), Chiba, Tokyo Metropolis (sometimes singulated), and Kanagawa prefectures. South Kantō is often regarded as synonymous with the Greater Tokyo Area. As part of Japan's attempts to predict earthquakes, an area roughly corresponding to South Kantō has been designated an 'Area of Intensified Observation' by the Coordinating Committee for Earthquake Prediction.

The Japanese House of Representatives' divides it into the North Kantō (北関東, Kita-Kantō) electorate which consists of Ibaraki, Tochigi, Gunma, and Saitama prefectures, Tokyo electorate, and the South Kantō (南関東, Minami-Kantō) electorate which consists of Chiba, Kanagawa, and Yamanashi prefectures (note that Yamanashi is out of the Kantō region in the orthodox definition).

Keirin's South Kantō (南関東, Minami-Kantō) consists of Chiba, Kanagawa, and Shizuoka prefectures.

=== East and west ===
This division is not often but sometimes used.

- East Kantō (東関東, Higashi-Kantō): Ibaraki, Tochigi, and Chiba prefectures.
- West Kantō (西関東, Nishi-Kantō): Gunma, Saitama, Tokyo, Kanagawa (and sometimes Yamanashi) prefectures.

=== Inland and coastal ===
This division is sometimes used in economics and geography. The border can be modified if the topography is taken for prefectural boundaries.

- Inland Kantō (関東内陸部, Kantō nairiku-bu): Tochigi, Gunma, Saitama (and sometimes Yamanashi) prefectures.
- Coastal Kantō (関東沿岸部, Kantō engan-bu): Ibaraki, Chiba, Tokyo, and Kanagawa prefectures.

=== Greater Kantō ===
The Japanese national government defines the National Capital Region (首都圏, Shuto-ken) as the Kantō region plus Yamanashi Prefecture. Japan's national public broadcaster NHK uses Kantō-kō-shin-etsu (関東甲信越) involving Yamanashi, Nagano, and Niigata prefectures for regional programming and administration.

=== Cities ===
The Kantō region is the most highly developed, urbanized, and industrialized part of Japan. Tokyo and Yokohama form a single industrial complex with a concentration of light and heavy industry along Tokyo Bay. Other major cities in the area include Kawasaki (in Kanagawa Prefecture); Saitama (in Saitama Prefecture); and Chiba (in Chiba Prefecture). Smaller cities, farther away from the coast, house substantial light and automotive industries. The average population density reached 1,192 persons per square kilometer in 1991.

== Economy ==
The Kantō region largely corresponds to the Tokyo Metropolitan Area with the exception that it does not contain Yamanashi prefecture.

The Tokyo Metropolitan Area has the largest city economy in the world and is one of the major global center of trade and commerce along with New York City, Los Angeles, Shanghai, Paris, Seoul, and London.

=== Greater Tokyo Area 2005 ===
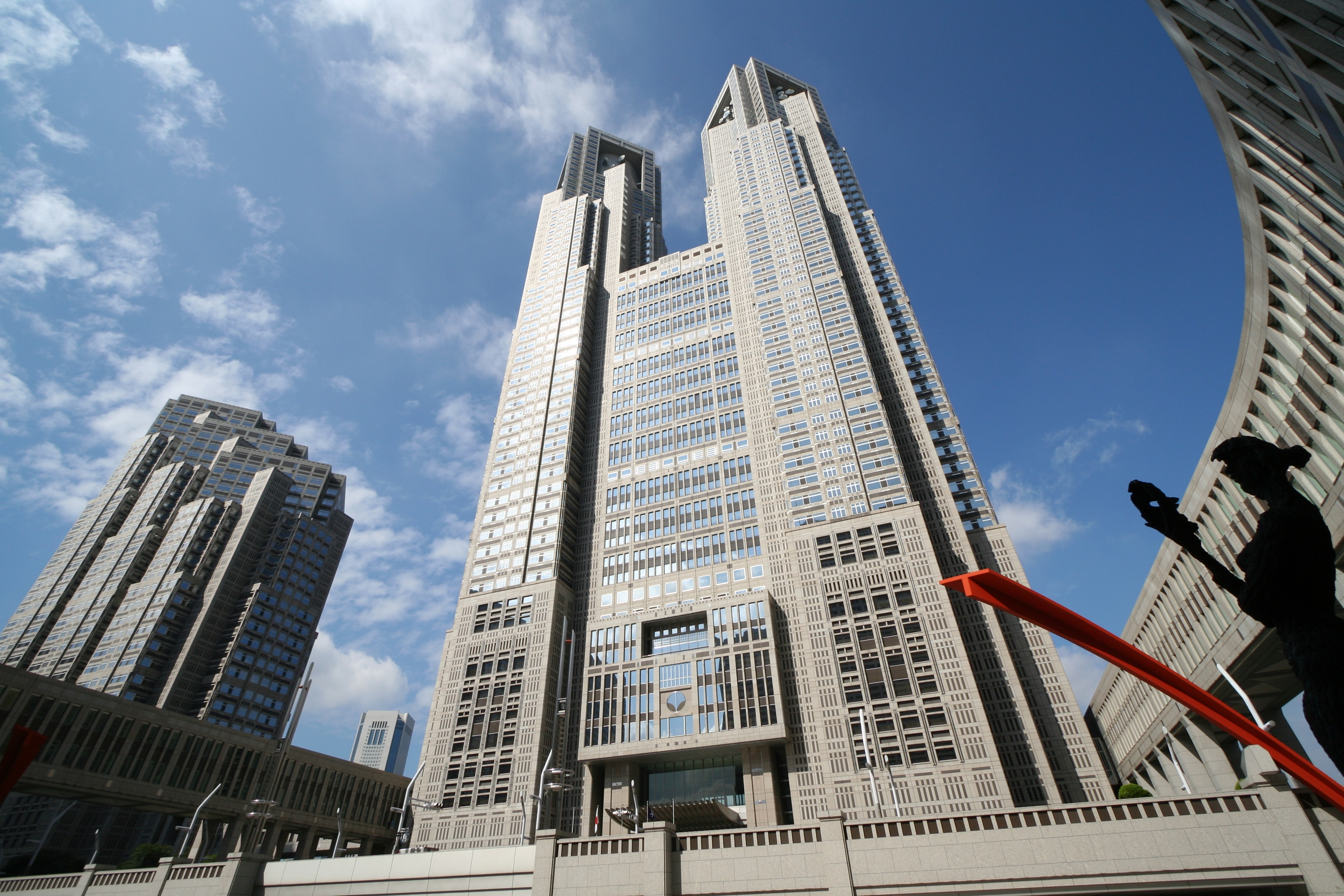
Tokyo Metropolitan Government Building

- 2005 average exchange rate (1 U.S. Dollar = 110.22 Yen)

| Prefecture | Gross Prefecture Product (in billion Yen) | Gross Prefecture Product (in billion US$) |
|---|---|---|
| Tokyo | 92,269 | 837 |
| Kanagawa | 31,184 | 282 |
| Saitama | 20,650 | 187 |
| Chiba | 19,917 | 180 |
| Ibaraki | 10,955 | 99 |
| Tochigi | 8,195 | 74 |
| Gunma | 7,550 | 68 |

=== GDP (purchasing power parity) ===
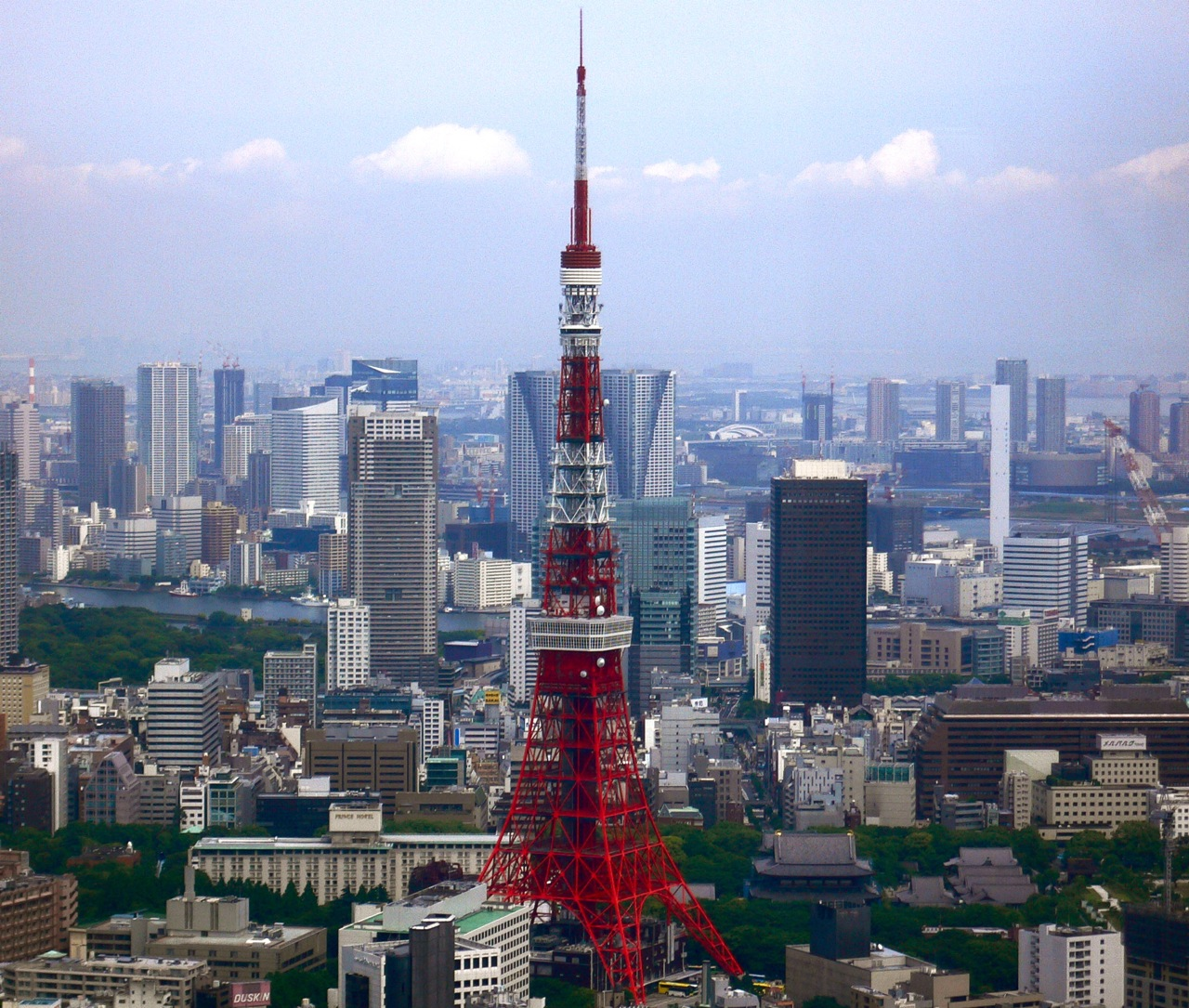
Tokyo Tower

The agglomeration of Tokyo is the world's largest economy, with the largest gross metropolitan product at purchasing power parity (PPP) in the world according to a study by PricewaterhouseCoopers.

=== Kanto Region Metropolitan Employment Area ===
| Year | 2010 | 1995 | 1980 |
|---|---|---|---|
| Employed Persons 000's | 16,234 | 16,381 | 12,760 |
| Production (billion USD) | 1,797 | 1,491 | 358 |
| Production Manufacturing (billion USD) | 216 | 476 | 159 |
| Private Capital Stock (billion USD) | 3,618 | 2,631 | 368 |
| Social Overhead Capital (billion USD) | 1,607 | 1,417 | 310 |
| 1 U.S. Dollar (Japanese yen) | 87.780 | 94.060 | 226.741 |

Sources:, Conversion rates - Exchange rates - OECD Data

== Population ==
Historical population
| Year | Pop. | ±% |
|---|---|---|
| 1920 | 11,127,000 | — |
| 1930 | 13,773,000 | +23.8% |
| 1940 | 16,866,000 | +22.5% |
| 1950 | 18,241,000 | +8.2% |
| 1960 | 23,003,000 | +26.1% |
| 1970 | 29,496,000 | +28.2% |
| 1980 | 34,896,000 | +18.3% |
| 1990 | 38,542,000 | +10.4% |
| 2000 | 40,433,711 | +4.9% |
| 2010 | 42,604,085 | +5.4% |
| 2020 | 43,653,441 | +2.5% |

The population of Kantō region is very similar to that of the Greater Tokyo Area except that it does not contain Yamanashi Prefecture and contains the rural populations throughout the region.

Per Japanese census data, and the region's data, Kantō's population has grown up until the 2020s. The 2025 Census recorded 43.51 million residents of the region, showing a decline since 2020 of 140,000.

The Kantō region had a population of 43.65 million people in the 2020 Census.

== See also ==
- Geography of Japan
- Kanto, a fictional region in the Pokémon franchise which is based on Kantō
- Kantō dialect
- Kantō Fureai Trail, aka Capital Region Nature Trail, a collection of hiking trails circumnavigating the entire Kantō region
- Kantō Plain

== Bibliography ==
- 早川, 和見 (2011), 古河藩, シリーズ藩物語, 現代書館, ISBN 978-4-7684-7124-1
- Abe, Takeshi; Nishimura, Keiko (1990), 戦国人名事典 [Biographical Dictionary of Sengoku-Period Figures] (in Japanese) (Compact ed.), Shin-Jinbutsu-Oraisha, ISBN 4-404-01752-9
- Nakamura, Akira (2010). 図解雑学 徳川家康 (図解雑学シーリーズ) (in Japanese). Natsume Company. ISBN -978-4816332661.
- Nussbaum, Louis-Frédéric and Käthe Roth. (2005). Japan encyclopedia. Cambridge: Harvard University Press. ISBN 978-0-674-01753-5; OCLC 58053128
- This article incorporates text from this source, which is in the public domain. "Kanto". Country Studies. Federal Research Division.
