= Siege of Fushimi Castle =

Part of the Battle of Sekigahara (1600)

Siege of Fushimi
- Part of the Sengoku period
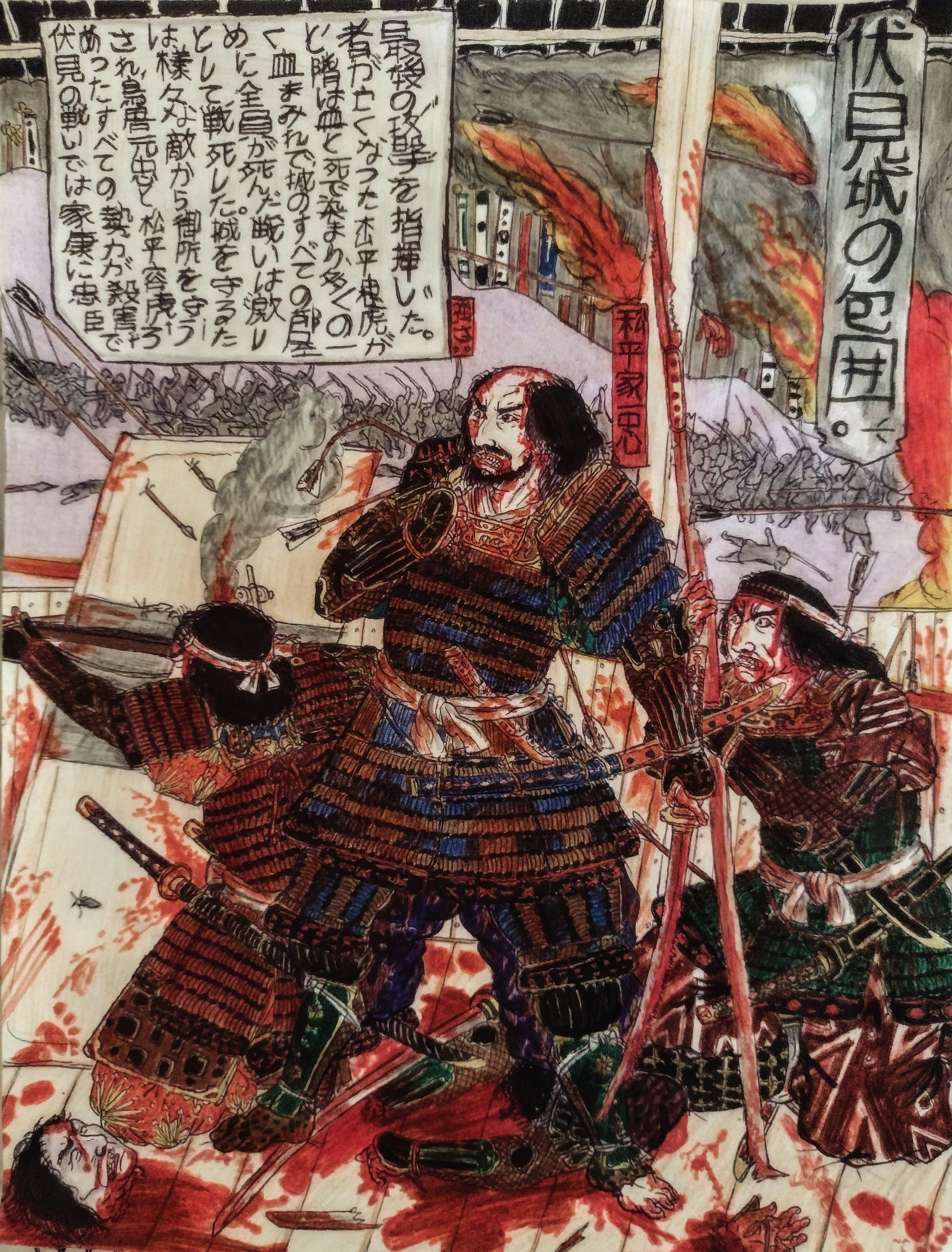
| Date | 27 August – 8 September 1600 |
| Location | Fushimi Momoyama castle, just outside Kyoto, Japan |
| Result | Mitsunari victory |
| Territorial changes | Castle falls to Western army |

Belligerents
| Western army; force of Ishida Mitsunari | Eastern army garrison loyal to Tokugawa Ieyasu |

Commanders and leaders
| Ishida Mitsunari; Kobayakawa Hideaki; Kasuya Takenori | Torii Mototada †; Matsudaira Ietada † |

Strength
| 40,000 | 2,000 |

Casualties and losses
| Unknown | Entire garrison |

The siege of Fushimi was a crucial battle in the series leading up to the decisive Battle of Sekigahara which ended Japan's Sengoku period. Fushimi Castle was defended by a force loyal to Tokugawa Ieyasu's Eastern army, led by Torii Mototada. Knowing of his inevitable defeat, Torii's sacrifice diverted Ishida Mitsunari's attention, and part of his Western army, away from his Nakasendō fortresses, which were attacked by Tokugawa during the siege of Fushimi. Ultimately, the castle fell, but served a crucial role in allowing for greater strategic victories by Tokugawa.

== Background ==
Fushimi was originally built several years earlier, as a luxurious palace for Toyotomi Hideyoshi, but was destroyed by an earthquake in 1596. Tokugawa Ieyasu rebuilt it and placed it under the care of Torii Mototada. As war with Ishida approached, Tokugawa saw that this would be a prime target for his enemies, as it stood quite close to Kyoto and guarded many of the approaches to, and past, the city. Visiting the castle, he discussed his fears with Torii, who assured his lord that he would be willing to sacrifice himself, and the castle, for the greater strategic gain of his lord. It is said he even suggested reducing the garrison, in order to free up warriors who could serve better purposes in other locations; knowing the castle would fall anyway, he saw no need for the entire garrison to be sacrificed.

== Siege ==
Ishida's army began their assault on 27 August, but made little progress for ten days. At one point, one of the towers was even lit on fire, but was soon put out by a member of the garrison, who lost his life in the process. Ultimately, a message was sent into the castle tied to an arrow, explaining that the besieging army had taken the wife and children of one of the defenders hostage, and would crucify them unless he betrayed his compatriots. Thus, on 8 September, one of the towers was set aflame from within the castle, and a number of Ishida's men broke through. Matsudaira Ietada was killed fighting against Ishida Mitsunari. The central keep was then lit aflame, but Torii Mototada and his garrison continued to fight until all but ten had been killed.

== Aftermath ==
Torii and his family then committed suicide, his selfless sacrifice coming to be known later as a great example of samurai loyalty and honor.

The castle would be regained by Tokugawa soon afterwards, following his victory at Sekigahara. The wooden floors from Fushimi Castle were moved to a Buddhist temple, Hōsen-in, also in Kyoto, where they were made into a ceiling. The bloodstained ceiling is still visible in the temple, and records from the period identify Torii's body/stains as well as those of his retainers.

== See also ==
- Hōsen-in in the Japanese Wikipedia (in Japanese)
- La Haye Sainte, another crucial delaying battle
