= Torii Mototada =

Japanese samurai and daimyo (1539–1600)

- 鳥居 元忠

Head of Torii clan
- In office 1572–1600
- Preceded by: Torii Tadayoshi
- Succeeded by: Torii Tadamasa

Personal details
- Born: 1539 Okazaki, Aichi
- Died: September 8, 1600 (aged 60–61) Fushimi, Kyoto
- Relations: Honda Shigetsugu (brother in law)
- Children: Torii Tadamasa

Military service
- Allegiance: Tokugawa clan
- Commands: Tanimura Castle
- Battles/wars: Siege of Terabe (1558); Battle of Mikatagahara (1573); Siege of Suwahara Castle (1575); Tenshō-Jingo War (1582); Battle of Kurokoma; Tokugawa-Toyotomi conflict (1584); Battle of Komaki and Nagakute; Siege of Ueda castle (1585); Siege of Tanaka castle (1587); Siege of Odawara (1590); Siege of Iwatsuki Castle; Sekigahara Campaign; Siege of Fushimi Castle

Torii Hikoemon Mototada (鳥居 彦右衛門 元忠; 1539 – September 8, 1600) was a Japanese samurai and daimyo of the Sengoku-through late-Azuchi–Momoyama periods, who served Tokugawa Ieyasu. Torii died at the siege of Fushimi, where his garrison was greatly outnumbered and destroyed by the army of Ishida Mitsunari. Torii's refusal to surrender had a great impact on Japanese history; the fall of Fushimi bought Ieyasu time to regroup his army and eventually win the Battle of Sekigahara.

== Early life ==
Torii was born in Okazaki, the son of Torii Tadayoshi. As a boy, he was sent as hostage to the Imagawa clan. The young Mototada served the then-Matsudaira Takechiyo as a page. After Ieyasu's return from the Imagawa clan, and his unification of Mikawa Province, Mototada served as one of his chief generals.

In 1572, Mototada succeeded the Torii family headship, following the death of his father.

== Service under Ieyasu ==
He participated in the siege of Terabe Castle in 1558, and The Battle of Anegawa in June of 1570.

In 1573, He fought at the Battle of Mikatagahara and Battle of Suwahara Castle the following year and was wounded in the legs, which rendered walking difficult for him from then on.

In 1582, Tenshō-Jingo War broke out between the Tokugawa clan and Hōjō clan in a contest to gain control of the area of Shinano Province, Ueno region, and Kai Province (currently Gunma Prefecture), which had been vacant since the destruction of Takeda clan and the death of Oda Nobunaga. Ieyasu lead an army of 8,000 soldiers entering Kai, Shinano Province, and Ueno, to annex it. In the battle of Wakamiko, 8,000-10,000 Tokugawa soldiers fought against around 50,000 soldiers of Hojo soldiers led by Hōjō Ujinao. This conflict lasted for 80 days. In the final phase of this conflict, Naomasa participated in the battle of Kurokoma. At some point of this war, Hōjō Ujikatsu led a detachment of 10,000 soldiers in encircling the rear of Tokugawa army to entrap them. Sensing this, Torii Mototada led a raid group of 2,000 to repel their attempt, leading to the battle of Kurokoma. The Hōjō army failed to launch trap Tokugawa's army from the rear.

Later, in 1585, he joined Ōkubo Tadayo and Hiraiwa Chikayoshi in laying siege to the Sanada clan's Ueda Castle. However, his forces were repulsed and suffered heavy losses.

During the conflict between Toyotomi against Hōjō clan, Mototada participated in the siege of Iwatsuki Castle. After Ieyasu's move to the Kantō region, a former territory of Hōjō clan, Mototada was granted the 40,000 koku fief of Yasaku in Shimōsa Province, which made him a Daimyō.

== Death ==
With the death of Toyotomi Hideyoshi in 1598, the remainder of the Council of Five Elders & the rest of the Toyotomi government had Mōri Terumoto as its titular head, though he stayed entrenched in Osaka Castle so leadership fell to Mitsunari in the field. In August 1600, Mototada was forewarned by spies that an army of 40,000 battle-hardened followers of Toyotomi Hideyori, now under Mitsunari, formed a coalition against Tokugawa and were annihilating everything in their path on their march to Fushimi Castle. Date Masamune, by Tokugawa Ieyasu's order, was holding off forces in the North against Uesugi Kagekatsu while Ieyasu was racing east to Edo to gather his forces, but he needed time. All Ieyasu's hopes rested on the fate of his castle at Fushimi, a fortress that controlled all roads that led east. Torii Mototada and his 1800 men garrison were badly outnumbered, and it should be mentioned that escape for the men inside was still possible.

In an act of loyalty to his lord Tokugawa Ieyasu, Torii chose to remain behind, honoring his friend & lord's request, pledging that he and his bastion would fight to the very end. When Ishida Mitsunari's army of 40,000 attacked, perhaps the greatest and most noble accomplishment in all of samurai history took place. Despite the insurmountable odds that Torii Mototada & his men faced, they defended Fushimi Castle for 12 days killing several thousands of Mitsunari's army. They fought until there were only 10 of them left and committed ritual suicide.

In a last statement addressed to his son Torii Tadamasa, Mototada described how his family served the Tokugawa for generations and how his own brother had been killed in battle. In the letter, Torii stated that he considered it an honor to die first so that he might give courage to the rest of the Tokugawa warriors. He envisioned Tokugawa's reign would remain far off into the future. He requested that his son raise his siblings to serve the Tokugawa clan "In both ascent and decline" and to remain humble desiring neither lordship nor monetary reward. When the order was given, the two lifelong friends, Torii Mototada and Tokugawa Ieyasu parted ways sadly knowing that they would never see each other again:

"It is not the Way of the Warrior to be shamed and avoid death even under circumstances that are not particularly important ... For myself, I am resolved to make a stand within the castle and to die a quick death. It would not take much trouble to break through a part of their numbers and escape, no matter how many tens of thousands of horsemen approached for the attack or by how many columns we were surrounded. But that is not the true meaning of being a warrior, and it would be difficult to account as loyalty. Rather, I will stand off the forces of the entire country here, and ... die a resplendent death."

== Notable Action ==
Torii Mototada's actions had a great impact on the course of Japanese history. Tokugawa Ieyasu would raise an army of 90,000 and confront Ishida Mitsunari's forces at Sekigahara in what would be one of the bloodiest battles in the Sengoku period. 40,000 heads would be taken in the first hours of battle and 70,000 would perish in the next two days as the remnants of Mitsunari's vanquished army were hunted down and executed. The Battle of Sekigahara was a decisive one, resulting in the unification of Japan. Tokugawa's family would rule the entire country for the next 268 years.

Mototada's suicide at the fall of Fushimi is one of the most celebrated acts of seppuku in Japanese history.

== Descendants ==
Among his descendants, Ōishi Yoshio (1659-1703), Karō (Chief retainer) of the Akō Asano clan, leader and hero of the Forty-seven Rōnin's revenge against Kira Yoshinaka, was his great-great-grandson, through Yoshio's father Ōishi Yoshiaki, maternal grandson of Torii Tadakatsu, fourth son of Torii Mototada.

== Notes ==
Preceded by none	1st Lord of Yasaku (Torii); 1590–1600	Succeeded by Torii Tadamasa
