= Matsudaira Ietada (Fukōzu) =

Japanese samurai (1555–1600)

- 松平 家忠
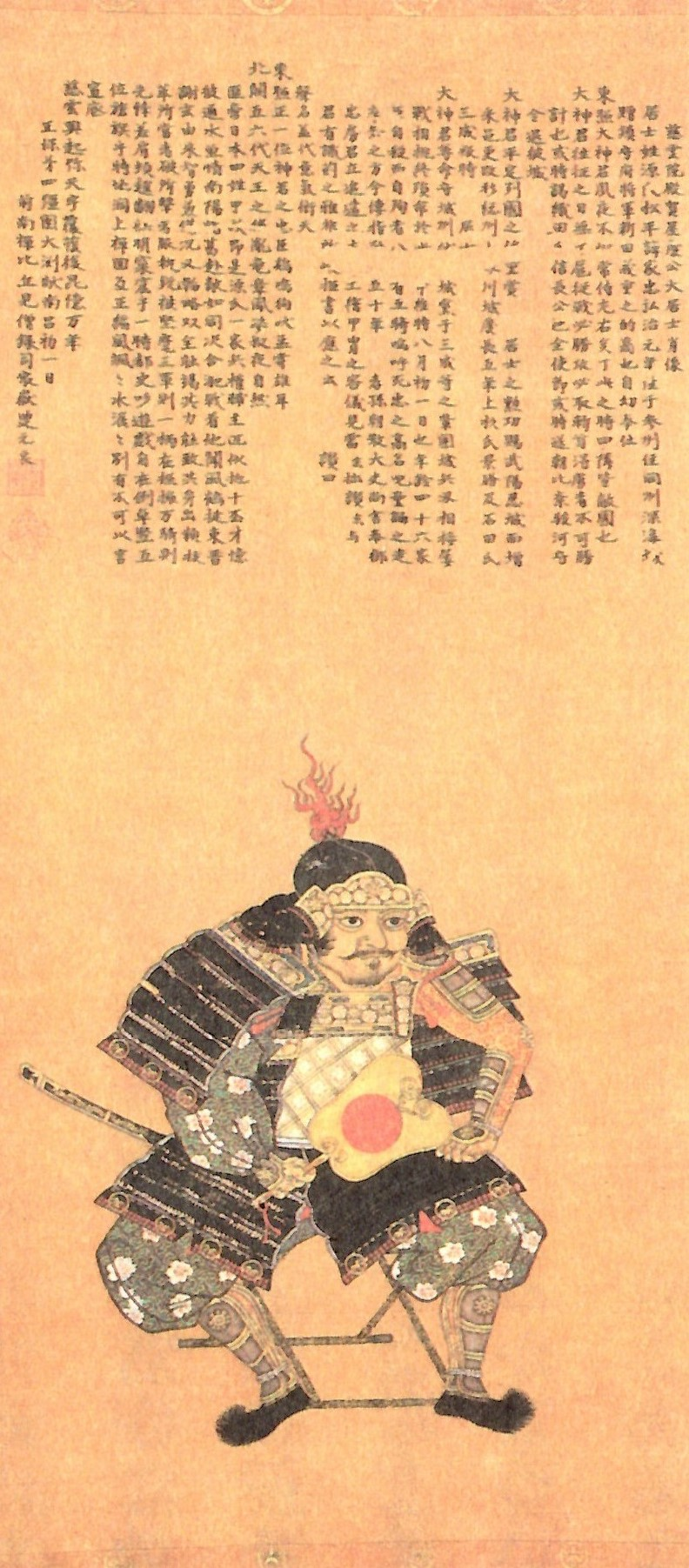

Lord of Omigawa
- In office 1594–1600
- Succeeded by: Matsudaira Tadayoshi

Personal details
- Born: 1555 Mikawa Province
- Died: September 8, 1600 (aged 44–45) Fushimi, Yamashiro Province
- Nickname: Tomomo no Suke

Military service
- Allegiance: Tokugawa clan
- Unit: (Fukōzu-Matsudaira)
- Battles/wars: Battle of Mikatagahara (1572); Battle of Nagashino (1575); Siege of Takatenjin (1581); Battle of Komaki-Nagakute (1584); Siege of Odawara (1590); Siege of Fushimi Castle (1600)

This is about a member of the Fukōzu-Matsudaira. For others of the same name, see Matsudaira Ietada.

Matsudaira Ietada (松平 家忠; 1555 – September 8, 1600), also known as Tomomo no Suke, was a Japanese samurai of the Sengoku period. He was the adoptive father of Matsudaira Tadayoshi, the fourth son of Tokugawa Ieyasu

== Biography ==
Ietada was the fourth son of Matsudaira Koretada, who was the head of the Fukōzu branch of the Matsudaira clan. Ietada served his brother Tokugawa Ieyasu from a young age.

In 1572, he fought at the Battle of Mikatagahara. He fought in many of Ieyasu's campaigns, including against Takeda Katsuyori in the Battle of Nagashino 1575. and took part in the Siege of Takatenjin (1581) against Okabe Motonobu.

In 1590, after Siege of Odawara, Ietada was granted Oshi Domain (100,000 koku) in Musashi Province. He was transferred to Kashira Domain in 1592 and to Omigawa Domain in 1594.

In 1599, he was given command of Fushimi Castle near Kyoto. He was killed fighting against Ishida Mitsunari at the siege of Fushimi in 1600.

== Legacy ==
Ietada is known for his journal, Ietada nikki (家忠日記), which he kept for the 17 year interval between 1575 and August 1594.

Preceded by Matsudaira Koretada	4th Fukōzu-Matsudaira family head 1575-1600	Succeeded by Matsudaira Tadatoshi
Preceded by none	1st Lord of Oshi (Fukōzu-Matsudaira); 1590-1592	Succeeded by Matsudaira Tadayoshi
Preceded by none	1st Lord of Omigawa (Fukōzu-Matsudaira); 1594-1600	Succeeded by Matsudaira Tadatoshi
