= Fushimi Castle =

Castle in Kyoto, Japan

Coordinates: 34°56′15″N 135°46′52″E

Fushimi Castle 伏見城
- Fushimi-ku, Kyoto, Japan
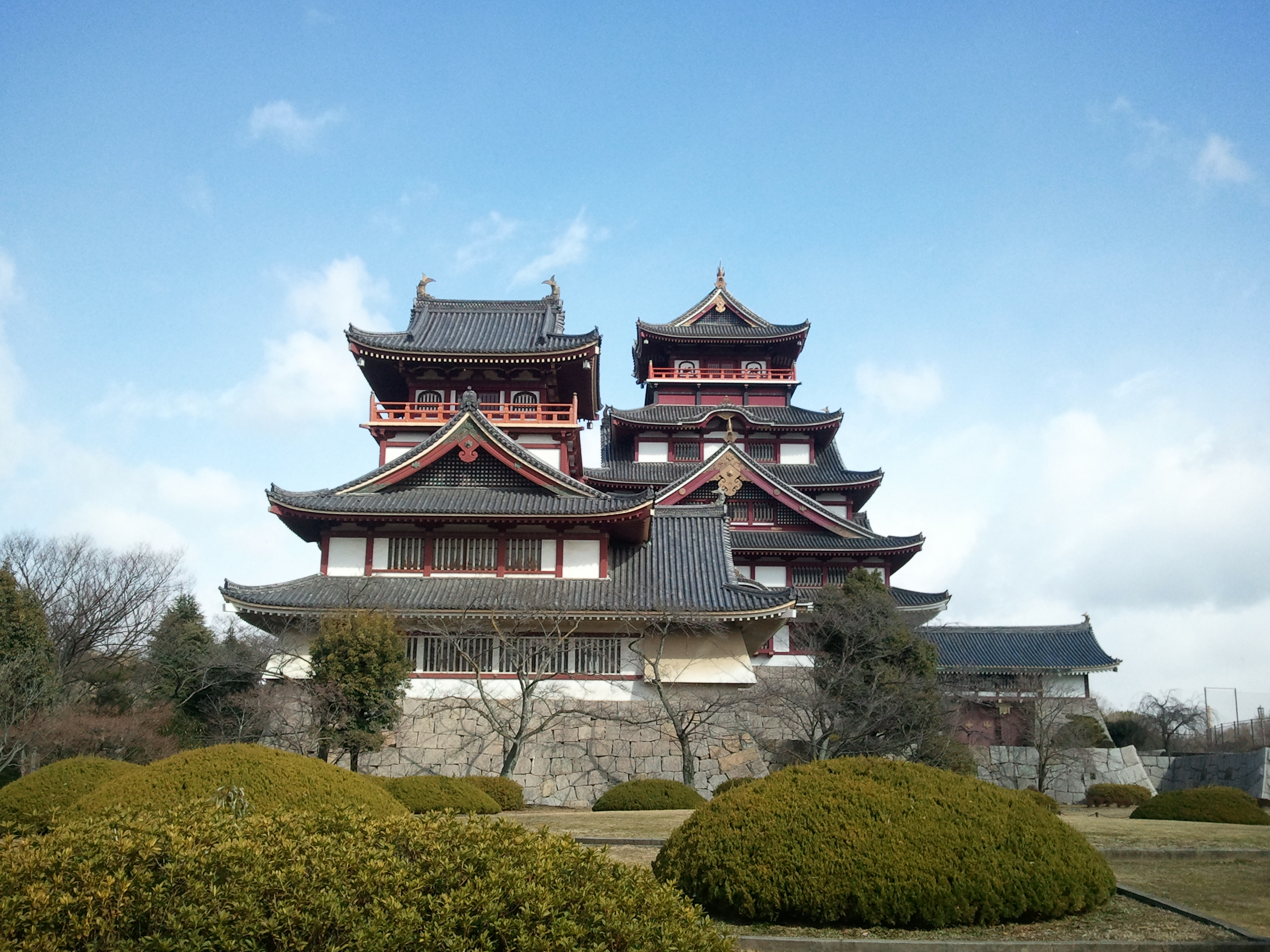

Site information
- Type: Azuchi-Momoyama castle
- Controlled by: Toyotomi Hideyoshi (1592–1598); Torii Mototada (1598–1600); Tokugawa shogunate (1600–1623); Japan (1964–present)
- Condition: Reconstructed; buildings closed to the public since 2003

Location
- Location within Kyoto Prefecture Location within Japan

Site history
- Built: 1592–1594, rebuilt late 1590s, again in 1964
- Built by: Toyotomi Hideyoshi (original)
- In use: 1592–1623
- Materials: stone, wood, plaster, gold
- Demolished: 1596 by an earthquake; dismantled 1623

Fushimi Castle (伏見城, Fushimi-jō), also known as Momoyama Castle (桃山城, Momoyama-jō) or Fushimi-Momoyama Castle, is a Japanese castle located in Fushimi Ward, Kyoto.

Fushimi Castle was constructed from 1592 to 1594 by Toyotomi Hideyoshi at the end of the Sengoku period as his retirement residence. Fushimi Castle was destroyed in the 1596 Keichō–Fushimi earthquake and rebuilt before eventually being demolished in 1623 and its site later used for the tomb of Emperor Meiji. The current Fushimi Castle is a replica constructed in 1964 near the original site in Fushimi.

The Azuchi–Momoyama period of Japanese history partially takes its name from Fushimi Castle.

== History ==
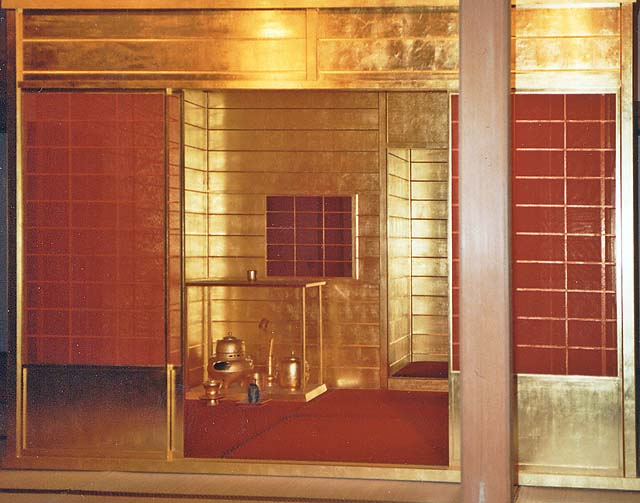
Golden Tea Room in Fushimi Castle

Construction of the original Fushimi Castle begun in 1592, the year after Toyotomi Hideyoshi's retirement from the regency, and was completed in 1594. Twenty provinces provided workers for the construction, which numbered between 20,000 and 30,000.

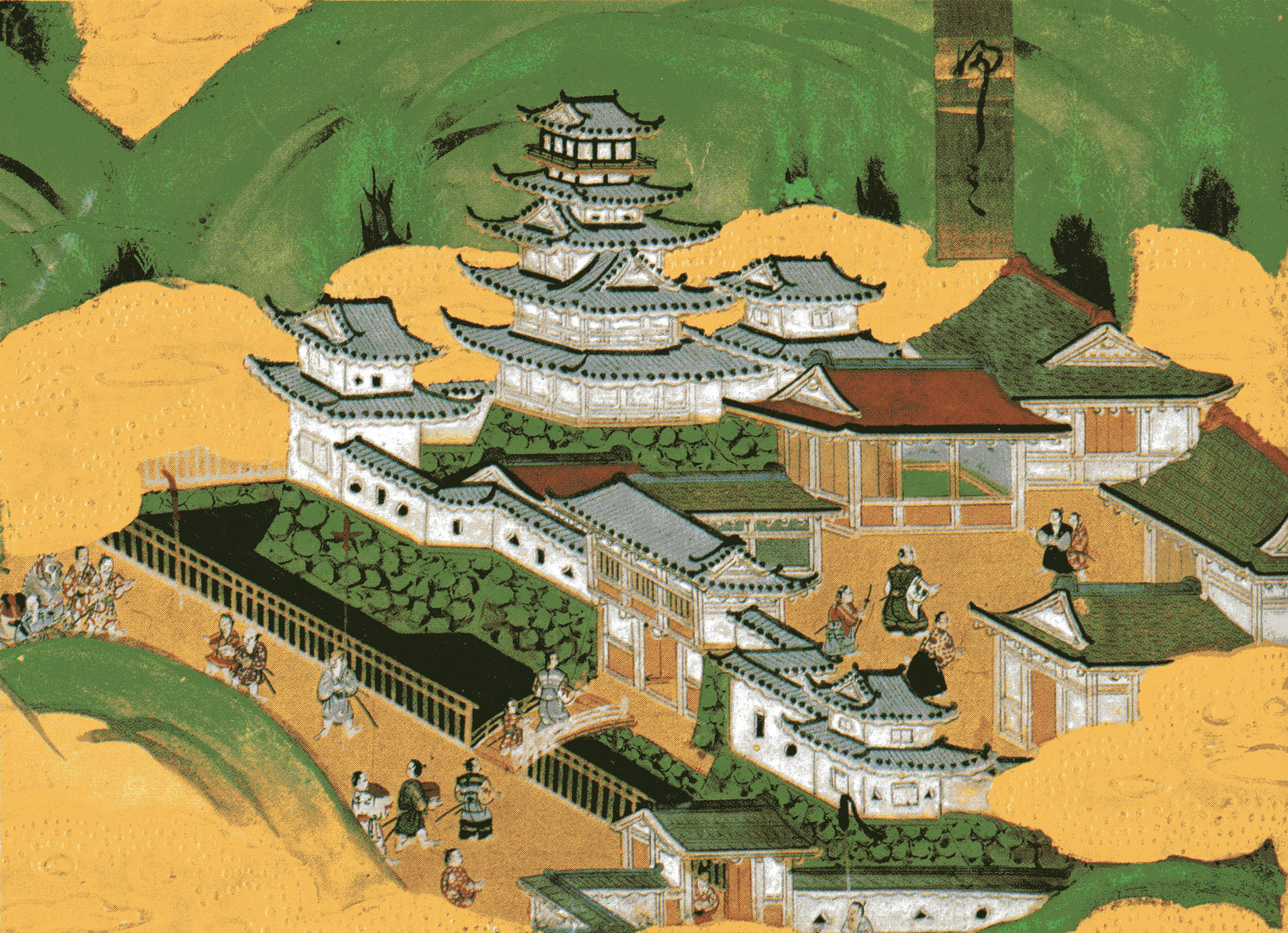
Fushimi Castle before being demolished in 1623.

Though bearing the external martial appearance of a castle, the structure was intended as a retirement palace for Hideyoshi, and was furnished and decorated as such. It is particularly famous for its Golden Tea Room, in which both the walls and the implements were covered in gold leaf. The castle was intended to be the site for Hideyoshi's peace talks with Chinese diplomats seeking an end to the Seven-Year War in Korea, but an earthquake destroyed the castle entirely only two years after its completion.

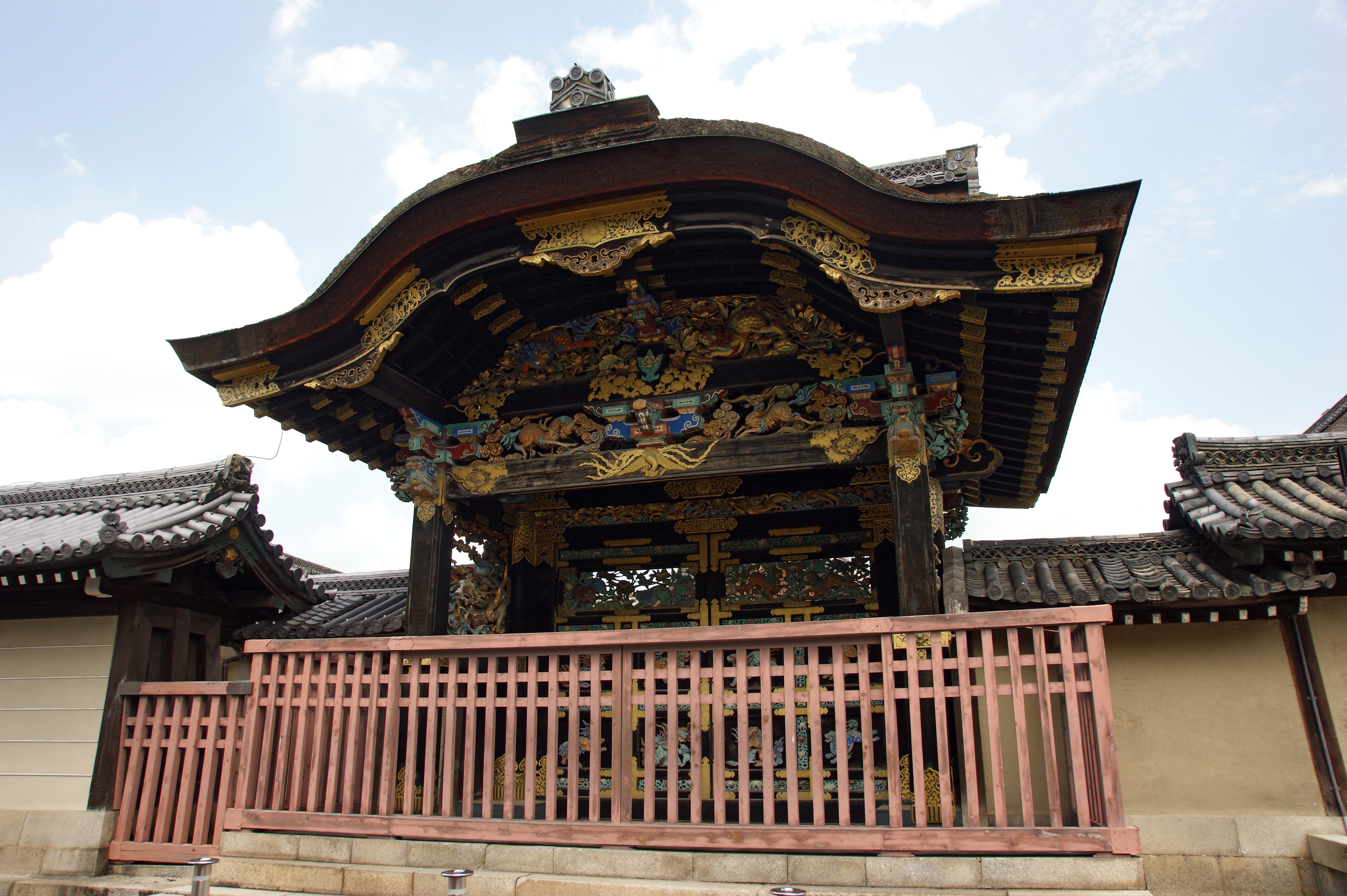
Karamon gate was moved to Nishi Hongan-ji

It was rebuilt soon afterwards, and came to be controlled by Torii Mototada, a vassal of Tokugawa Ieyasu. In 1600, the castle fell in a famous and significant siege by Ishida Mitsunari. Torii, in a celebrated act of honor and bravery, defended the castle for eleven days, delaying Ishida's forces and allowing his lord Tokugawa time to build his own army. This had a profound effect on the Battle of Sekigahara that came soon afterwards, and which marked the final victory of Tokugawa Ieyasu over all his rivals.

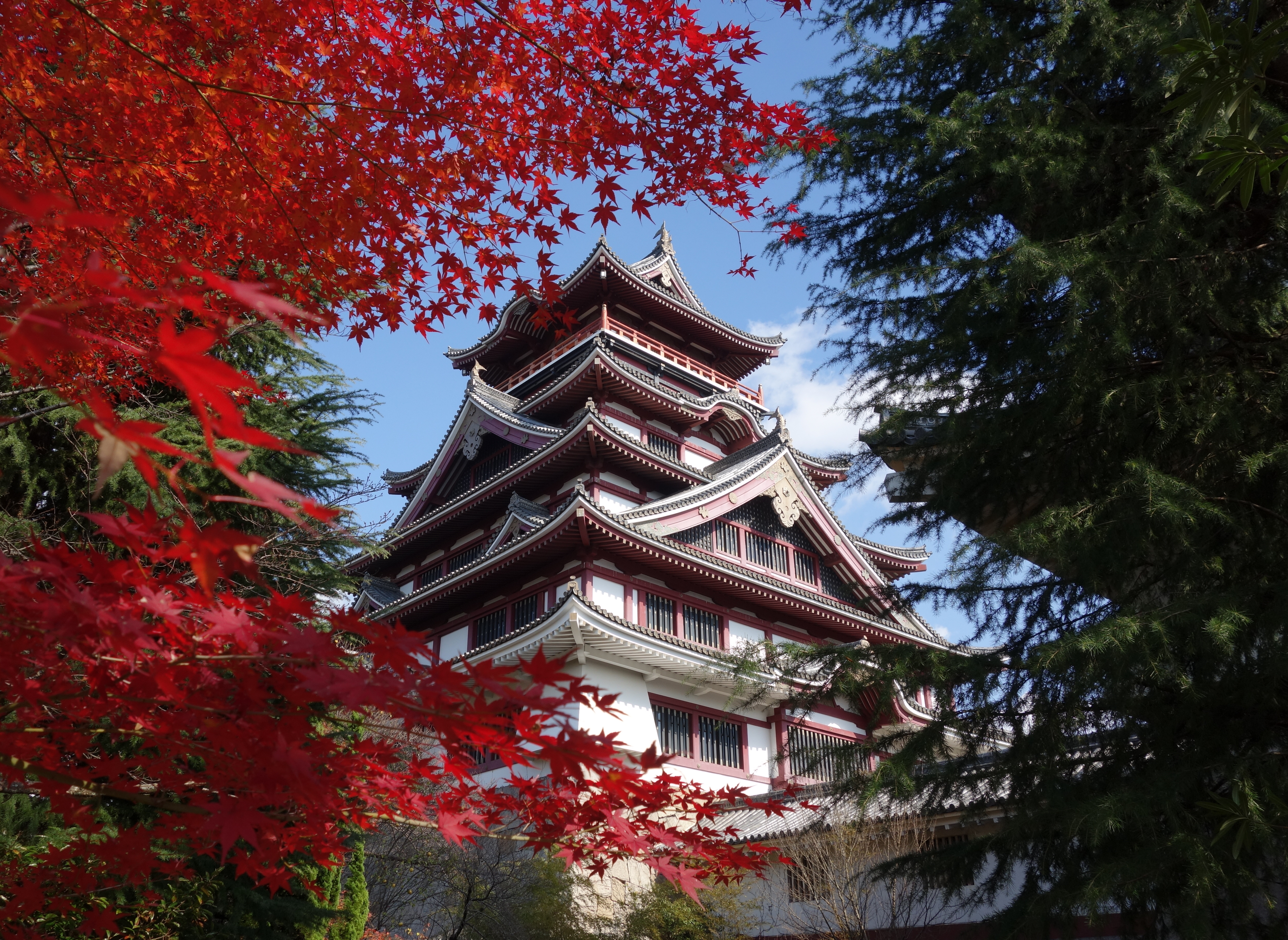
Fushimi-Momoyama Castle in autumn

In 1623, the castle was dismantled, and many of its rooms and buildings were incorporated into castles and temples across Japan. Several temples in Kyoto, such as Yōgen-in (養源院), Genkō-an (源光庵), and Hōsen-in (宝泉院), have a blood-stained ceiling that had been the floor of a corridor at Fushimi Castle where survivors of Torii's garrison had committed seppuku after the castle's defenses were breached.

In 1912, the tomb of Emperor Meiji was built on the original site of the castle. The castle was not rebuilt until 1964, when a replica was created very nearby and primarily in concrete. The new structure served as a museum of the life and campaigns of Hideyoshi, and as the main attraction of a small theme park called "Castle Land", but was closed to the public in 2003. The castle grounds, however, were reopened in 2007.

== See also ==
- Jurakudai—Hideyoshi's previous luxurious residence from 1587 to 1594
