= Brothers in Arms (TV series) =

- Written by: Hiroyuki Yatsu
- Directed by: Yoshio Watanabe and others
- Starring: Taiga Nakano; Sosuke Ikematsu; Riho Yoshioka; Minami Hamabe; Sei Shiraishi; Maki Sakai; Emma Miyazawa; Anna Kurasawa; Nagi Inoue; Tetsuhiro Ikeda; Tsutomu Takahashi; Onoe Ukon II; Ayumu Nakajima; Ryosuke Yamada; Shunsuke Daito; Kouhei Matsushita; Masaki Suda; Jun Kaname; Makiya Yamaguchi; Hidetaka Yoshioka; Aoi Miyazaki; Shun Oguri
- Narrated by: Sakura Ando
- Composer: Hideakira Kimura
- Country of origin: Japan
- Original language: Japanese
- No. of episodes: 45

Production
- Running time: 45 minutes
- Production company: NHK

Original release
- Network: NHK General TV
- Release: January 4, 2026

Brothers in Arms (豊臣兄弟!, Toyotomi Kyōdai!)is a Japanese historical drama television series starring Taiga Nakano as Toyotomi Hidenaga. The series is the 65th NHK taiga drama.

== Plot ==
Born into a poor farming family, Koichiro (later Toyotomi Hidenaga) spent peaceful days tilling the fields with his family. However, one day, his long-missing elder brother, Tokichiro (later Toyotomi Hideyoshi), returned. Tokichiro had become a samurai serving Oda Nobunaga and asked Koichiro to work as his assistant. Koichiro hesitated briefly, but ultimately accepted. This is where the grand success story of the two brothers, bound by a strong bond, truly begins.

== Cast ==
=== Starring role ===
- Taiga Nakano as Toyotomi Hidenaga
  - Seigou Hirayama as young Hidenaga

=== His family ===
- Sosuke Ikematsu as Toyotomi Hideyoshi, Hidenaga's brother
  - Yura Kimura as young Hideyoshi
- Riho Yoshioka as Chika, Hidenaga's wife
- Minami Hamabe as Nene, Hideyoshi's wife
- Maki Sakai as Naka, Hidenaga and Hideyoshi's mother
- Kensaku Kobayashi as Yaemon, Hidenaga and Hideyoshi's father (Note: Although Hideyoshi and Hidenaga were long believed to be half-brothers, recent research suggests that both were children of Yaemon and Naka. This drama adopts the latter theory.)
- Riku Onishi as Hashiba Yoichiro, Chika's child with her ex-husband, and Hidenaga's adopted son. (Note: In history, he is believed to be the biological child of Hidenaga and Chika.)
  - Haru Takagi as young Yoichiro
- Anji Ikehata as Sue, Hidenaga and Chika's daughter
- Emma Miyazawa as Tomo, Hidenaga and Hideyoshi's sister
- Shusaku Kamikawa as Yasuke (Miyoshi Yoshifusa), Tomo's husband
- Ryosuke Yamada as Toyotomi Hidetsugu, Tomo and Yasuke's son
  - Sakura Otokida as Yorozumaru (young Hidetsugu)
- Anna Kurasawa as Asahi, Hidenaga and Hideyoshi's sister
- Mizuki Maehara as Jinsuke (Soeda Yoshinari), Asahi's husband
- Ichirōta Miyagawa as Asano Nagakatsu, Nene's father
- Yoko Moriguchi as Fuku, Nene's mother
- Coco Masui as Yaya, Nene's sister
- Nobunaga Daichi as Asano Nagayoshi, a.k.a. Asano Nagamasa. Yaya's husband.
- Nagi Inoue as Chacha, Hideyoshi's concubine
  - Yuria Masutome as young Chacha
- Hinata Hiiragi as Hashiba Hidekatsu, a son of Nobunaga and an adopted son of Hideyoshi.
- Miharu Fukuchi as Gōhime, a daughter of Toshiie and Matsu, as well as an adopted daughter of Hideyoshi.
- Seijun Nobukawa as Mugi

=== Hidenaga's vassal ===
- So Kaku as Tōdō Takatora
- Takashi Sumita as Kuwayama Shigeharu
- Koudai Matsuoka as Yoshikawa Heisuke
- Mamoru Hagiwara as Kobori Masatsugu
- Kinari Hirano as Haneda Masachika

=== Hideyoshi's vassals ===
- Masaki Suda as Takenaka Hanbei
- Yuki Kura as Kuroda Kanbei
- Yurito Mori as Shojumaru, Kanbei's son
- Tsutomu Takahashi as Hachisuka Masakatsu
- Hiroki Numaguchi as Inada Tanemoto
- Leo Matsumoto as Ishida Mitsunari
- Gen Ito as Katō Kiyomasa
- Yuki Matsuzaki as Fukushima Masanori
- Jun Nishiyama as Hirano Nagayasu
- Ikuma Nagatomo as Katagiri Katsumoto

=== The people of Nakamura village ===
- Sei Shiraishi (Note: The role was initially announced to be played by Mei Nagano, but she withdrew from the part just before the start of filming after reports about her in Shūkan Bunshun. NHK urgently sought a replacement actress, and Sei Shiraishi was chosen.) as Nao, Hidenaga's first love
  - Rana Izutani as young Nao
- Koji Okura as Sakai Kizaemon, Nao's father
- Yōji Tanaka as Ryoun, a monk
- Jiei Wakabayashi as Shinkichi
- Yuki Takao as Genta
- Ryusei Fukuda as Nabemaru

=== Oda clan ===
- Shun Oguri as Oda Nobunaga
  - Shuga Murakami as young Nobunaga
- Aoi Miyazaki as Oichi
- Makiya Yamaguchi as Shibata Katsuie
- Shunsuke Daito as Maeda Toshiie
- Yūka Sugai as Maeda Matsu, Toshiie's wife
- Jun Kaname as Akechi Mitsuhide
- Takashi Naito as Saitō Toshimitsu
- Yuta Koseki as Oda Nobutada
- Kousei Yuki as Oda Nobutaka
- Tatsuya Yamawaki as Oda Nobukatsu
- Naoto Takenaka as Matsunaga Hisahide
- Daikichi Sugawara as Sakuma Nobumori
- Hiroto Kanai as Sakuma Morishige
- Taro Suwa as Hayashi Hidesada
- Kenji Mizuhashi as Mori Yoshinari
- Ichikawa Danko V as Mori Ranmaru
- Tetsuhiro Ikeda as Niwa Nagahide
- Jin Shirasu as Sassa Narimasa
- Kento Shibuya as Maeno Nagayasu
- Masanobu Katsumura as Yokokawa Jinnai
- Masaki Kaji as Kido Kozaemon
- Shingo Murakami as Takeda Sakichi
- Takenori Kaneko as Yanada Masatsuna
- Motoki Nakazawa as Oda Nobukatsu (Nobuyuki), Nobunaga's brother
  - Shoma Ishita as young Nobukatsu
- Atsushi Ogata as Oda (Tsuda) Nobuzumi
  - Kanata Kajigaya as young Nobuzumi
- Hina Higuchi as Chiyo, Nobuzumi's mother
- Mei Fukuda as Chiyo's maid
- Kenta Izuka as Takigawa Kazumasu
- Arata Horii as Ikeda Tsuneoki
- Fuga Shibazaki as Ikeda Motosuke
- Tortoise Matsumoto as Araki Murashige
- Kasumi Yamaya as Dashi, Murashige's wife
- Yuji Sugao as Nakagawa Kiyohide
- Shion Otomo as Nakagawa Hidemasa
- Tomohiro Ichikawa as Takayama Ukon
- Takato Nagata as Mōri Shinsuke
- Nao Kakuya as Hattori Koheita
- Ikuya Naganuma as Tsutsui Junkei
- Hiroyuki Kido as Tsutsui Sadatsugu
- Yuya Endo as Sakuma Morimasa
- Iori Shimizu as Sanbōshi
- Einojo Hayase as Tsugawa Katsumitsu
- Yoshihiro Nakayama as Menju Katsuteru

=== Tokugawa clan ===
- Kouhei Matsushita as Tokugawa Ieyasu
  - Haru Tanikaga as Takechiyo (young Ieyasu)
- Takaya Sakoda as Ishikawa Kazumasa
  - Youta Mimoto as young Kazumasa
- Rihito Tachibana as Ogii, Ieyasu's second son.
- Ruka Hikage as Chomaru, Ieyasu's third son.
- Omi Natsuki as Honda Tadakatsu
- Hiroyuki Amano as Sakai Tadatsugu
- Louis Kurihara as Sakakibara Yasumasa
- Nichika Akutsu as Ii Naomasa

=== Azai clan ===
- Ayumu Nakajima as Azai Nagamasa
- Takaaki Enoki as Azai Hisamasa, Nagamasa's father
- Kosei Omi as Manpukumaru
- Donpei as Miyabe Keijun
- Kanata Irei as Endō Naotsune
- Sora Tamaki as Hatsu
  - Minami Mori as young Hatsu
- Airi Nishikawa as Go
  - Kana Nagai as young Go

=== Saito clan ===
- Tatsuomi Hamada as Saitō Tatsuoki
- Daigo as Saitō Yoshitatsu, Tatsuoki's father
- Akaji Maro as Saitō Dōsan, Tatsuoki's grandfather
- Tetsushi Tanaka as Andō Morinari, Chika's father
- Yusaku Mori as Ando Sadaharu
- Eiji Okuda as Horiike Yorimasa, Chika's father-in-law
- Yumi Asō as Horiike Kinu, Chika's mother-in-law
- Satoru Matsuo as Osawa Jirozaemon
- Kurara Emi as Shino, Jirozaemon's wife
- Rairu Sugita as Osawa Mondo
- Yasuhito Shimao as Inaba Yoshimichi, a.k.a. Inaba Ittetsu
- Yamato Kochi as Ujiie Naomoto

=== Ashikaga shogunate ===
- Onoe Ukon II as Ashikaga Yoshiaki
- Yoshiaki Kameda as Hosokawa Fujitaka
- Ryosuke Mikata as Mitsubuchi Fujihide
- Takamasa Tamaki as Wada Koremasa

=== Mōri clan ===
- Shogo Hama as Mōri Terumoto
- Hiroshi Yamamoto as Kobayakawa Takakage
- Motoki Kobayashi as Kikkawa Motoharu
- Tatekawa Danshun as Ankokuji Ekei
- Hideo Nakano as Otagaki Terunobu

=== Others ===
- Gitan Ohtsuru as Imagawa Yoshimoto
- Yugo Mikawa as Imagawa Ujizane
  - Rimu Kuwaki as Tatsuo-maru (young Ujizane)
- Shosuke Kajiya as Rin'ami
- Masanobu Takashima as Takeda Shingen
- Kazuaki Ishii as Yamagata Masakage
- Junya Kudo as Uesugi Kenshin
- Shingo Tsurumi as Asakura Yoshikage
- Mansaku Ikeuchi as Asakura Kageaki
- Hiroshi Shigeoka as Asakura Kagetake
- Hiroyuki Isobe as Chōsokabe Motochika
- Yuta Hayashi as Chōsokabe Nobuchika
- Keisuke Horibe as Tani Tadazumi
- Masato Wada as Imai Sōkyū
- Magy as Tsuda Sōgyū
- Ryouhei Abe as Iwanari Tomomichi
- Hideki Nakano as Miyoshi Nagayasu
- Yohei Okuda as Miyoshi Soi
- Masafumi Senoo as Miyoshi Yasunaga
- Koji Yamamoto (Time Machine No. 3) as Noto-ya
- Futoshi Seki (Time Machine No. 3) as Tachibana-ya Matasaburo
- Naoyuki Fernandez as Luís Fróis
- Suguru Adachi as Murakawa Takenosuke
- Miou Tanaka as Bessho Yoshichika
- Shugo Oshinari as Bessho Shigemune
- Kyohei Shimokawa as Bessho Nagaharu
- Daisuke Kuroda as Kakujo
- Yosuke Omizu as a guard
- Ao Watanabe as Amago Katsuhisa
- Yusuke Hirose as Yamanaka Yukimori a.k.a. Yamanaka Shikanosuke
- Mayu Tsuruta as Kissho
- Hidetaka Yoshioka as Sen no Rikyū
- Shōsuke Tanihara as Hōjō Ujimasa
- Toshihito Kokubo as Hōjō Ujinori
- Tomoya Maeno as Konoe Sakihisa
- Tsurutaro Kataoka as Kanō Eitoku
- Shotaro Mamiya as Saizo
- Shun Nohira as Koheita
- Kentaro Ito as Ishikawa Seibei
- Ryotaro Sakaguchi as Bankaku
- Shoichiro Akaboshi as Kenshin
- Motohiro Niina as Shun'ei
- Shinsuke Kato as Kawakubo Kiyotoshi
- Yasuhito Hida as Ukita Naoie
- Shugo Nagashima as Ukita Hideie
- Kenta Maeno as Shimazu Yoshihiro
- Mayumi Tanaka as an old woman

== TV schedule ==
Episode	Title	Directed by	Original airdate	Rating
1	"Nihiki no Saru" (二匹の猿)	Yoshio Watanabe	January 4, 2026	13.5%
2	"Negai no Kane" (願いの鐘)	Yoshio Watanabe	January 11, 2026	12.2%
3	"Kessen Zen'ya" (決戦前夜)	Yoshio Watanabe	January 18, 2026	12.9%
4	"Okehazama!" (桶狭間!)	Tetsuya Watanabe	January 25, 2026	13.1%
5	"Uso kara deta Makoto" (噓から出た実)	Tadashi Tanaka	February 1, 2026	12.5%
6	"Kyodai no Kizuna" (兄弟の絆)	Tadashi Tanaka	February 15, 2026	11.8%
7	"Kesshi no Chikujo Sakusen" (決死の築城作戦)	Yoshio Watanabe	February 22, 2026	10.9%
8	"Sunomata Ichiya-jo" (墨俣一夜城)	Yoshio Watanabe	March 1, 2026	12.1%
9	"Takenaka Hanbei to iu Otoko" (竹中半兵衛という男)	Tetsuya Watanabe	March 8, 2026	10.4%
10	"Nobunaga Joraku" (信長上洛)	Tetsuya Watanabe	March 15, 2026	12.1%
11	"Honkoku-ji no Hen" (本圀寺の変)	Yu Sakai	March 22, 2026	11.6%
12	"Odani-jo no Saikai" (小谷城の再会)	Yoshio Watanabe	March 29, 2026	11.4%
13	"Giwaku no Hanayome" (疑惑の花嫁)	Yoshio Watanabe	April 5, 2026	11.8%
14	"Zettai Zetsumei!" (絶体絶命!)	Shinichiro Ishikawa	April 12, 2026	12.2%
15	"Anegawa Daikassen" (姉川大合戦)	Tetsuya Watanabe	April 19, 2026	11.6%
16	"Kakugo no Hieizan" (覚悟の比叡山)	Yu Sakai	April 26, 2026	11.9%
17	"Odani Rakujo" (小谷落城)	Yoshio Watanabe	May 3, 2026	10.4%
18	"Hashiba Kyodai!" (羽柴兄弟!)	Tadashi Tanaka	May 10, 2026	10.7%
19	"Kako kara no Shikaku" (過去からの刺客)	Yoshio Watanabe	May 17, 2026	10.9%
20	"Honmono no Hiragumo" (本物の平蜘蛛)	Shinichiro Ishikawa	May 24, 2026	11.6%
21	"Fuun! Takeda-jo" (風雲! 竹田城)	Akihiro Watanabe	May 31, 2026	10.8%
22	"Harima Daigosan" (播磨大誤算)	Tetsuya Watanabe	June 7, 2026	10.8%
23	"Saraba Hanbei" (さらば半兵衛)	Yoshio Watanabe	June 14, 2026	11.2%
24	"Gunshi Kanbei!" (軍師官兵衛!)	Yu Sakai	June 21, 2026	11.1%
25	"Jihen no Yocho" (事変の予兆)	Shinichiro Ishikawa	June 28, 2026	11.4%
26	"Nobunaga o Warawasero!" (信長を笑わせろ!)	Shinichiro Ishikawa	July 5, 2026	11.3%
27	"Honno-ji no Hen" (本能寺の変)	Yoshio Watanabe	July 12, 2026	11.3%
28	"Isoge! Hideyoshi" (急げ!秀吉)	Yoshio Watanabe	July 19, 2026	10.3%
29	"Tenka e no Michi" (天下への道)	Tadashi Tanaka	July 26, 2026	10.5%
30	"Kiyosu Kaigi" (清須会議)	Tadashi Tanaka	August 9, 2026	10.4%
31	"Korede, Owakare ni Gozaimasu" (これで、お別れにございます)	Hiroshi Kaida	August 16, 2026	10.7%
32	"Shizugatake no Ketto" (賤ヶ岳の決闘)	Yoshio Watanabe	August 23, 2026	10.1%
33	"Kitanosho-jo no Wakare" (北庄城の別れ)	Yoshio Watanabe	August 30, 2026	9.2%
34	"Saikyo no Rival" (最強のライバル)	Shinichiro Ishikawa	September 6, 2026	11.0%
35	"Hidenaga Tanjo" (秀長誕生)	Shinichiro Ishikawa	September 13, 2026	9.9%
36	"Himewako to Oniwako" (姫若子と鬼若子)	Yu Sakai	September 20, 2026	10.1%
37	"Hidenaga no Kuni" (秀長の国)	Yoshio Watanabe	September 27, 2026	9.4%
38	"Wa o Motte, Yamato o Nasu" (和を以て、大和をなす)	Takafumi Kudo	October 4, 2026	9.5%
39	"Chacha no Honshin" (茶々の本心)	Yoshio Watanabe	October 11, 2026	9.4%
40	"Asahi no Koshiire" (あさひの輿入れ)	Yu Sakai	October 18, 2026	9.6%
41	"Ieyasu no Yabo" (家康の野望)	Shinichiro Ishikawa	October 25, 2026	10.5%
42	"Kitano Ocha no Yu" (北野大茶湯)	Yoshio Watanabe	November 1, 2026	10.4%
43	"Denka no Katanagari" (殿下の刀狩り)	Akihiro Watanabe	November 8, 2026	8.8%
44	"Aru Kashin no Shi" (ある家臣の死)	Yu Sakai	November 15, 2026	9.1%
45	"Tenkabito no Boso" (天下人の暴走)		November 22, 2026	
46	"Hidetsugu no Ran" (秀次の乱)		November 29, 2026	
