= Nakagawa Hidemasa =

- 中川秀政
- Born: 1568
- Died: 27 November 1592 (aged 24); Battle of Bunroku
- Occupation: Samurai commander
- Spouse: Tsuruhime
- Parent: Nakagawa Kiyohide (father)
- Relatives: Nakagawa Hidenari (brother); Oda Nobunaga (father-in-law)

Nakagawa Hidemasa (中川秀政; 1568 – November 27, 1592) was a samurai commander in the Azuchi–Momoyama period. He was the eldest son of Nakagawa Kiyohide. His young brother was Nakagawa Hidenari. His wife was Tsuruhime who was the daughter of Oda Nobunaga.

== Career ==
At first, Hidemasa and Kiyohide served Nobunaga. They served Hashiba Hideyoshi after Nobunaga died.

In 1583, Hidemasa succeeded to a house and his father's domain which was 50,000 koku at Ibaraki, Settsu Province since Kiyohide killed by Sakuma Morimasa at the Battle of Shizugatake. Hidemasa was active in the Battle of Komaki and Nagakute in 1584 and the expedition to Shikoku in 1585. Hideyoshi praise him, and gave him 65,000 koku at Miki, Harima Province instead of his domain which he had ruled.

After that, Hidemasa took part in the expedition to Kyushu in 1587 and the siege of Odawara in 1590.

== Death ==
In 1592, he died at 25 in the Battle of Bunroku.
