= Morimasa =

- Gender: Male

Origin
- Origin: Japanese
- Meaning: Different meanings depending on the kanji used

Morimasa (written: 守正 or 盛政) is a masculine Japanese given name. Notable people with the name include:

- Prince Nashimoto Morimasa (梨本宮守正王) (1874–1951), Japanese prince and general
- Sakuma Morimasa (佐久間 盛政) (1554–1583), Japanese samurai
