= Ikehata =

Ikehata is a Japanese surname that may refer to

- Anji Ikehata (池端 杏慈, born 2007), Japanese model and actress
- Hiroshi Ikehata (池畑, born 1970), Japanese weightlifter
- Kanae Ikehata (池端, born 1982), Japanese foil fencer
- Shinnosuke Ikehata (池畑, born 1952), Japanese comedienne, singer, dancer and actor
- Seiichi Ikehata (池端, 1929–2007), Japanese politician
- Yōsuke Ikehata (池端, born 1979), Japanese football player
