= Nakagawa Hidenari =

- 中川秀成
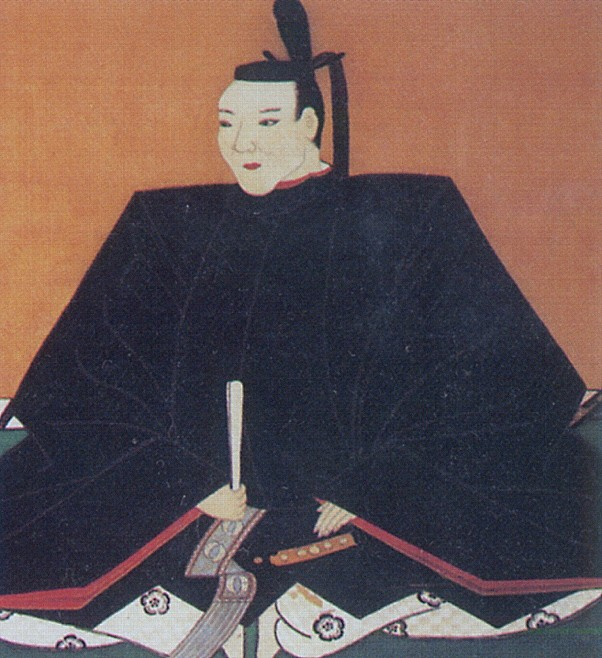
- Born: 1570
- Died: 6 September 1612 (43)
- Relatives: Nakagawa Kiyohide (father); Nakagawa Hidemasa (brother)
- Military career
- Rank: Daimyō
- Conflicts: Korean Campaign; Sekigahara Campaign

Nakagawa Hidenari (中川秀成) (1570 – September 9, 1612) was a Japanese daimyō in the Azuchi–Momoyama to Edo period. He was the 2nd son of Nakagawa Kiyohide.

== Career ==
In 1582, Kiyohide died in the Battle of Shizugatake and Hidenari's brother Hidemasa succeeded to the family headship. However, Hidemasa died young in 1592 and Hidenari succeeded to the house and the domain. Thanks to his service under Toyotomi Hideyoshi, he was soon moved to the Oka Domain in Bungo Province, with an income raise from 66,000 koku to 74,000 koku. In 1597, Hidenari took part in the invasion of Korea under Tōdō Takatora.

In 1600 at the Battle of Sekigahara, he sided with the eastern army, attacking and defeating Ōta Kazuyoshi at Usuki Castle. As a result, Tokugawa Ieyasu let him maintain his domain without being disturbed.

Preceded by none	Daimyō of Oka; 1594–1612	Succeeded by Nakagawa Hisamori
