= Katsuteru =

- Gender: Male

Origin
- Origin: Japanese
- Meaning: Different meanings depending on the kanji used

Katsuteru (written: 勝照 or 家照) is a masculine Japanese given name. Notable people with the name include:

- Asahiyutaka Katsuteru (旭豊 勝照; born 1968), Japanese sumo wrestler
- Menjō Katsuteru (毛受 家照; died 1583), Japanese samurai
