= Seven Spears of Shizugatake =

Bodyguards for Toyotomi Hideyoshi

The Seven Spears of Shizugatake (賤ヶ岳の七本槍, Shizugatake no shichi-hon-yari) is a sobriquet given to 7 vassals of Toyotomi Hideyoshi famed for their participation at the Battle of Shizugatake in 1583. According to legend, at the decisive moment in the battle, Hideyoshi ordered them to leave their position and charge at the opposing army led by Shibata Katsuie. After Hideyoshi gained control of Japan, he recognized the Seven Spears for their meritorious service at Shizugatake and promoted many of them to influential vassal positions.

While the term "Seven Spears of Shizugatake" was not mentioned by name in the time of Hideyoshi, later generations count them as the following:

Name	Fukushima Masanori	Hirano Nagayasu	Kasuya Takenori	Katagiri Katsumoto	Katō Kiyomasa	Katō Yoshiaki	Wakisaka Yasuharu
Portrait							
Life date	1561–1624	1559–1628	1562–1607	1556–1615	1562–1611	1563–1631	1554–1626

== Historiography ==
The name "Seven Spears of Shizugatake" is somewhat of a misnomer, as the term may not have appeared until the Edo-period Tenshōki record authored by Ōmura Yūko, in which not 7, but 9, of Hideyoshi's vassals were compensated for their service at Shizugatake.

In addition to the seven traditionally listed samurai, Ōmura's account also mentions:

- Sakurai Iekazu (d. 1596) - former house servant of Hideyoshi; later served Hideyoshi's half-brother Toyotomi Hidenaga and adopted son Hideyasu; was granted a 3,000-koku domain in Tanba Province for his service at Shizugatake
- Ishikawa Kazumitsu (d. 1583) - hereditary servant of the Toyotomi alongside his brother, Yoriaki; was killed in battle at Shizugatake, after which Hideyoshi praised his achievement and granted 1,000 koku to Yoriaki

The term of "Seven Spears" is elsewhere alleged to have first appeared in the Taikōki record compiled by Oze Hoan in 1625, 42 years after the Battle of Shizugatake.

Recent academic research has questioned the true achievements of these figures in Shizugatake. It is likely that their importance in the battle was greatly exaggerated by Hideyoshi, who did not yet have any vassals with established reputation or strong influence. According to other historical records, Katō Kiyomasa's rise to fame was largely owed to his accomplishments in the financial and civil administration of the Hashiba family; the anecdotes of his legendary military feats in Shizugatake were unconfirmed. Fukushima Masanori also claimed that he felt embarrassed to be compared with Wakizaka Yasuharu.

At the Battle of Sekigahara and Siege of Osaka, six of the Seven Spears betrayed Toyotomi Hideyori, the son of Hideyoshi, and sided with Tokugawa Ieyasu. The sole Toyotomi loyalist of the Seven Spears was Kasuya Takenori, who fought at Sekigahara under Ishida Mitsunari; nevertheless, he was later pardoned by the victorious Ieyasu. After siding with Ieyasu at Sekigahara, Hirano Nagayasu attempted to switch sides again and join Toyotomi Hideyori in the Siege of Osaka, but was denied entry to Osaka Castle.
