= Anji Ikehata =

Japanese model and actress (born 2007)

- Born: September 8, 2007 (age 19); Tokyo, Japan
- Occupations: Model; actress
- Years active: 2021–present
- Agent: LesPros Entertainment
- Modeling information
- Height: 165 cm (5 ft 5 in)
- Hair color: black
- Eye color: brown

Japanese name
- Kanji: 池端 杏慈
- Hiragana: いけはた あんじ
Transcriptions
- Romanization: Ikehata Anji

Anji Ikehata (池端 杏慈(いけはた あんじ), Ikehata Anji; born September 8, 2007) is a Japanese model and actress. She made her debut in the entertainment industry after winning the nationwide teen model magazine open audition during junior high school, and signed as an exclusive model. She then transitioned into acting, her most notable roles to date include Yano-kun's Ordinary Days and Brothers in Arms.

== Career ==
In 2021, Ikehata won the Grand Prix at the 25th Nicola Model Audition and became an exclusive model for the teen fashion magazine, Nicola. This was the first time in three years that a junior high school student was able to pass the nationwide open audition.

In 2022, Ikehata reached three milestones early in her career: She made her television debut in the seventh episode of the 2022 drama Old Rookie, which aired on August 14. She also appeared on the cover of the October issue of Nicola for the first time. Additionally, she made her voice acting debut in the animated film Lonely Castle in the Mirror, released on December 23.

In April 2023, she was selected to co-star with Sho Nishigaki in the Pocari Sweat commercial—widely seen as a stepping stone for young actresses. The ad has helped launch the careers of many prominent actresses, including Rie Miyazawa, Haruka Ayase, Haruna Kawaguchi, and Ayami Nakajo. Notably, she became the first actress to play a double lead role in the campaign.

On May 6, 2024, she did not renew her exclusive modeling contract with Nicola and thus left the magazine, to focus more on her acting career. In the same year, she made her film debut as the lead in the movie Yano-kun's Ordinary Days, released on November 15.

On March 19, 2025, it was announced that Ikehata would be the 15th CM girl for the wedding information magazine "Zexy". In October of the same year, it was decided that she would be the 21st "support manager" for the All Japan JFA 104th High School Soccer Tournament held on December 28, 2025 to January 12, 2026.

== Filmography ==
=== Film ===
Year	Title	Role	Notes	Ref.
2022	Lonely Castle in the Mirror	Moe Tojo (voice)	Animated film	
2024	Yano-kun's Ordinary Days	Kiyoko Yoshida		
2025	Strawberry Moon	Rei Takato		
2025	White Flowers and Fruits	Shiori Honokawa		
2026	Wandance	Wanda		

=== Television ===
Year	Title	Role	Notes	Ref.
2022	Old Rookie	Sakura Kondo	episode 7	
2025	The Bag Shop Inheritance	Yuko Tsuchiya	episode 2	
2026	Canned Mackerel Heads to Space	Ayaka Fujikura	episodes 9–11	
2026	Brothers in Arms	Sue	Taiga drama	
