= Yano-kun's Ordinary Days =

Japanese manga series written and illustrated by Yui Tamura

- First tankōbon volume cover

矢野くんの普通の日々 (Yano-kun no Futsū no Hibi)
- Genre: Romantic comedy; Slice of life
- Manga
- Written by: Yui Tamura
- Published by: Kodansha
- Imprint: Morning KC
- Magazine: Comic Days
- Original run: June 27, 2021 – present
- Volumes: 13
- Live-action film
- Directed by: Takehiko Shinjō
- Written by: Noriaki Sugihara; Kei Watanabe; Hajime Ibuki
- Music by: Nobuaki Nobusawa
- Studio: Shochiku
- Released: November 15, 2024
- Runtime: 106 minutes
- Anime television series
- Directed by: Shinpei Matsuo
- Written by: Deko Akao
- Music by: Hideakira Kimura
- Studio: Ajia-do
- Licensed by: Crunchyroll
- Original network: Nippon TV, BS11, AT-X
- Original run: October 1, 2025 – December 17, 2025
- Episodes: 12
- icon

Yano-kun's Ordinary Days (矢野くんの普通の日々, Yano-kun no Futsū no Hibi; lit. 'Mr. Yano's Ordinary Days') is a Japanese manga series written and illustrated by Yui Tamura. It began serialization on Kodansha's Comic Days website in June 2021. A live-action film adaptation premiered in Japanese theaters in November 2024. An anime television series adaptation produced by Ajia-do aired from October to December 2025.

== Plot ==
Kiyoko Yoshida constantly worries about Tsuyoshi Yano, who comes into school injured. They begin following each other out of concern for him, with Yoshida observing Yano's unlucky daily life and resolving to support him.

== Characters ==
Tsuyoshi Yano (矢野剛, Yano Tsuyoshi)
Voiced by: Kōhei Amasaki
Portrayed by: Yūsei Yagi
Yano is a clumsy boy who often ends up injured. He wears a blindfold over his right eye and is notably handsome. Yoshida immediately takes an interest in him because of his frequent injuries and offers to treat him, and he gradually develops a strong affection for her as she continues to care for him, with the two eventually beginning to date. Although he starts off surprisingly confident and direct around Yoshida, he becomes increasingly embarrassed and flustered as he realizes his feelings for her, showing jealousy or being harmlessly petty about small things. Despite his clumsiness, he is extremely kind, enjoys helping others, and is very skilled at drawing, as well as, occasionally does or says things that come across surprisingly cool, which often leave Yoshida and Hashiba flustered. He carries trauma from an accident in junior high that changed the color of his right eye, which led him to hide it behind an eyepatch after classmates began talking about it. A classmate once convinced him to remove the eyepatch, saying his eyes were beautiful, but after an incident where the two of them were injured, rumors spread that looking into his eye would curse people, reinforcing his insecurity. However, over time, his new friends — especially Yoshida — help him feel happier and less insecure, allowing him to finally experience a normal and fulfilling school life.
Kiyoko Yoshida (吉田清子, Yoshida Kiyoko)
Voiced by: Yuka Nukui
Portrayed by: Anji Ikehata
Yoshida is the class representative and Yano's girlfriend who first becomes interested in him due to his constant injuries, clumsiness and unusual charm. Kind, caring, and responsible, she frequently treats his wounds and looks after him, slowly developing strong feelings for him before the two eventually confess and begin dating. Despite being dependable, her grades are terrible, and she often overthinks things involving Yano while occasionally becoming jealous or defensive over him. She is close friends with Yuzukawa, Tanaka, Hashiba and Izumi, as well as helps care for her two younger siblings. Yoshida was the first person to help Yano open up about his insecurities, especially regarding his right eye, telling him that it is beautiful once she sees it. Around him, she shows a sweet and affectionate side, sometimes making him lunch, getting flustered when he does something impressive and putting extra effort into her appearance when they go on dates together. Yoshida supports Yano and helps him feel more confident and enjoy a normal school life.
Yūdai Hashiba (羽柴雄大, Hashiba Yūdai)
Voiced by: Taito Ban
Portrayed by: Kaito Nakamura
Hashiba is a capable, intelligent, and somewhat serious student who is a member of the school's baseball team. He has a strong crush on Yoshida, but finds himself too late as she begins dating Yano, leaving him in a conflicted position. Although Yano is technically his rival, Hashiba loves and respects him for his kindness, often worrying about his injuries and wanting to help take care of him. This creates a humorous situation where he both supports and competes with Yano, sometimes feeling awkward or frustrated when his own actions end up helping him. He was the one who lent Yano a romance manga that helped him realize his feelings for Yoshida. Hashiba is childhood friends with Izumi, who often tries to help him deal with his complicated feelings and he may have subtle feelings for her. He tends to get flustered whenever Yano unexpectedly does something cool.
Izumi (泉)
Voiced by: Rie Takahashi
Portrayed by: Mizuho Shiromiya
Izumi is a cheerful and light-hearted girl who is childhood friends with Hashiba and close friends with Yoshida and Yuzukawa. She is excellent at getting people to open up and naturally lifts the mood around her. Initially, Izumi tried to help Hashiba pursue Yoshida, but eventually focuses on helping him come to terms with his feelings after Yoshida begins dating Yano. She quietly has a crush on Hashiba herself. Her carefree attitude even inspires Yoshida to briefly imitate her relaxed approach to things, though Yoshida quickly realizes she cannot quite keep up with it. She also helps Yoshida with her make-up and appearance when preparing for dates. Like the others, she gets worried when Yano gets hurt often.
Mei Yuzukawa (柚川メイ, Yuzukawa Mei)
Voiced by: Atsumi Tanezaki
Portrayed by: Ria Niinuma
Yuzukawa is a calm and somewhat nonchalant girl who is Yoshida's best friend and one of the more laid-back members of the group. Although she sometimes can be a little detached, she is observant and obviously cares about Yoshida, quickly noticing that Yano makes her happier and more relaxed. Being intelligent in academics as well, she supports Yoshida from the start and encourages her relationship with Yano. She loves food and is frequently seen spending time with Tanaka. Like the others, she also worries whenever Yano gets hurt.
Haruto Tanaka (田中晴人, Tanaka Haruto)
Voiced by: Ryota Iwasaki
Portrayed by: Keigo Itō
Haruto is a somewhat eccentric member of the friend group who often seems to drift in and out of conversations, casually dropping odd or amusing remarks before moving on as if nothing happened. He might be dense and a little absent-minded, but his laid-back personality often adds humor to the group. Despite this, he obviously cares about his friends, sometimes suggesting ideas for everyone to hang out and worrying about Yano like the others. He also loves food and is often seen spending time with Yuzukawa.
Yano's father (矢野父, Yano Chichi)
Voiced by: Satoshi Hino
A kind and somewhat clumsy man who shares many of Yano's traits. He is warm and easygoing, often looking out for those around him. He is also one of the first to notice Yoshida's feelings for Yano and gently encourages her not to give up, explaining that Yano is not used to that sort of attention and often lives in his own world.
Mr. Omiya (大宮先生, Ōmiya-sensei)
Voiced by: Takuya Eguchi
Omiya is the class' homeroom teacher, a kind, capable, and caring adult who looks after his students well. Like much of the class, he often worries about Yano getting hurt and keeps an eye on him. He is approachable and easygoing, often playing along with the students while also stepping in to help when they need guidance or support.
Okamoto (岡本)
Voiced by: Konomi Kohara
Portrayed by: Ayame Tsutsui
Okamoto is Yano's middle school friend who once encouraged him to remove his eyepatch, telling him that his eyes were beautiful. After an incident in which the two of them were injured, rumors about Yano's eye spread and he began avoiding her to prevent her from getting hurt again, which hurt her very much as she did not understand why he suddenly distanced himself. She later transfers to the same high school where they meet again. With Yoshida and the others helping Yano realize that pushing people away only hurts them more, the two reconcile and she eventually joins their friend group.
Amika (アミカ)
Voiced by: Yukari Tamura
Kai (カイ)
Voiced by: Sōichirō Hoshi

== Media ==
=== Manga ===
Written and illustrated by Yui Tamura, Yano-kun's Ordinary Days began serialization on Kodansha's Comic Days website on June 27, 2021. As of September 2026, its chapters have been collected into thirteen tankōbon volumes.

No.	Release date	ISBN
1	November 10, 2021	978-4-06-525930-6
2	February 9, 2022	978-4-06-526748-6
3	June 8, 2022	978-4-06-528095-9
4	October 12, 2022	978-4-06-529451-2
5	March 8, 2023	978-4-06-530720-5
6	September 13, 2023	978-4-06-533058-6
7	February 14, 2024	978-4-06-534457-6
8	July 10, 2024	978-4-06-535982-2
9	November 13, 2024	978-4-06-537332-3
10	March 12, 2025	978-4-06-538766-5
11	October 8, 2025	978-4-06-540990-9
12	December 10, 2025	978-4-06-541713-3
13	September 9, 2026	978-4-06-544703-1

=== Live-action film ===
A live-action film adaptation was announced on July 4, 2024. Produced by Shochiku and directed by Takehiko Shinjō, with scripts written by Noriaki Sugihara, Kei Watanabe and Hajime Ibuki, and music composed by Nobuaki Nobusawa, the film premiered in Japanese theaters on November 15, 2024, featuring the insert song "Staying with You", performed by Travis Japan.

=== Anime ===
An anime adaptation was also announced on July 4, 2024, which is later confirmed to be a television series produced by Happinet, animated by Ajiado and directed by Shinpei Mitsuo, with Deko Akao handling series composition, Toshihasa Kaya designing the characters, and Hideakira Kimura composing the music. The series aired from October 1 to December 17, 2025, on Nippon TV's AnichU programming block and other networks. (Note: Nippon TV listed the series premiere on September 30 at 25:29, which is effectively October 1 at 1:29 a.m. JST.) The opening theme song is "Pop Life", performed by Fantastics from Exile Tribe, while the ending theme song is "Better Off", performed by iScream. Crunchyroll streamed the series.

==== Episodes ====
No.	Title	Directed by	Written by	Storyboarded by	Original release date
1	"Yano-kun" (Japanese: 矢野くん)	Shinpei Mitsuo	Deko Akao	Shinpei Mitsuo	October 1, 2025 (Note: This episode aired at 1:35 a.m. JST, six minutes after the regular air time on Nippon TV.)
Class president Kiyoko Yoshida sits next to Tsuyoshi Yano, who turns up everyday covered in bruises. Wondering about his predicament, Yoshida follows him to find out Yano is clumsy and accident-prone. Yano thanks her for worrying about him, flustering Yoshida and leading her to realise she has a crush on him. Yano becomes absent for several days and Yoshida hears he was hit by a truck. Fearing for his wellbeing, Yoshida runs to a hospital and learns to her relief Yano is fine and only suffered injuries from hitting a wall to dodge the truck. The two grow closer though Yoshida assumes Yano prefers being alone. Yoshida tries to have Yano open up to her, but she unintentionally causes Yano to sustain injuries. Feeling guilty, Yoshida offers to treat Yano's injuries and lends him her support. Yano is charmed by Yoshida's care and admits he wants to live a normal school life.
2	"A Lovely Portrait"; Transliteration: "Suteki na E" (Japanese: 素敵な絵)	Takahide Ogata	Deko Akao	Takahide Ogata	October 8, 2025
Yoshida wonders how she can help Yano live a normal school life. After learning Yano eats lunch by himself daily, Yoshida joins him with Mei Yuzukawa and Haruto Tanaka. However, their involvement causes Yano to experience several accidents, prompting Yano to return to eating alone for their safety. Undeterred by Yano's concerns, Yoshida decides she will make his lunch the next day, which he enjoys. Yano is knocked out by a picture frame, but he manages to not drop Yoshida's lunch and finishes eating it. Yoshida asks Yano they continue eating lunch together, which he agrees. Later at art class, Yoshida and Yano pair up to draw their faces, but they barely finish the task in time with Yoshida tending to Yano's injuries. Yoshida draws a crude portrait of Yano and is guilty with her crush on him, but Yano stuns her and their friends with his accurate portrait of Yoshida. Yano requests he and Yoshida pose with their portraits, amusing Yuzukawa and Tanaka.
3	"So Cool"; Transliteration: "Kakkoii" (Japanese: かっこいい)	Madoka Yaguchi	Hiroyuki Kishikura	Kazuhiro Yoneda	October 15, 2025
During P.E. class, Yoshida grows concerned that Yano will be hurt in dodgeball, which is exacerbated when she is placed in the team opposing him. Yoshida is caught by surprise with Yano's athleticism. Fearing she may injure Yano, Yoshida misses, and Yano lowers his guard for Yoshida's teammate Yūdai Hashiba to throw the ball at him and win. Yoshida compliments Yano on his abilities, though she is dismayed that Yano barely reacts to her. After school, Yoshida spots a man as accident-prone as Yano who turns out to be his father. Yano then invites her into their home, where Yoshida almost confesses her feelings when Yano's father asks if his accident-prone nature is burdening her. As Yano leaves to do chores, his father explains that Yano focuses entirely on avoiding injury, adding he may not have noticed Yoshida's crush on him. His father then shows support on her growing friendship with Yano, with Yoshida hoping that Yano can reciprocate her feelings in the future.
4	"The Person I Lve"; Transliteration: "Suki na Hito" (Japanese: 好きな人)	Hidekazu Oka	Azuki Azuki	Shinpei Mitsuo	October 22, 2025 (Note: This episode aired at 1:55 a.m. JST, 26 minutes after the regular air time on Nippon TV.)
Yoshida learns to her joy that Yano is working at a sweets shop. Yuzukawa notices Yoshida has grown more relaxed around Yano, but the latter becomes depressed when the teacher rearranges everyone's seats. Fortunately, Tanaka conspires with the class to ensure Yano sits next to Yoshida again. Later, Hashiba approaches Yoshida and suddenly confesses to her, though he assures he is not expecting anything as he knows Yoshida likes Yano. Yoshida notices she and Hashiba share common quirks. Hashiba wonders why she likes looking after Yano after seeing her grow anxious for his safety. Hashiba spends time with Yano, where he witnesses Yano's caring and friendly nature. Hashiba and Yano discuss how they see Yoshida, and Yano admits he sees her as a friend. Upon witnessing Yano's ditziness, Hashiba vaguely wishes Yoshida luck, confusing her.
5	"Study Session"; Transliteration: "Obenkyōkai" (Japanese: お勉強会)	Michita Shiraishi	Deko Akao	Shinpei Mitsuo	October 29, 2025
Izumi asks Yoshida to host a study session before exams. Yoshida, who is aware of her own middling grades, invites Yuzukawa, Yano, Tanaka, and Hashiba to the session as well to ensure their success. While studying, Yano observes Yoshida and Hashiba bond, leaving him unusually emotional. Following the end of exams, the group celebrates at a restaurant and Izumi gives humorous opinions on Hashiba and Yoshida acting like Yano's parents. Yano grows upset seeing Hashiba and Yoshida bond again, so he fakes being hurt to get Yoshida's attention. Yano then admits he lied and expresses on not wanting to be treated as a child by Yoshida, before changing the topic. At karaoke Yano distances himself from Yoshida, worrying her. Yoshida eventually asks Yano if he hates her, and Yano replies he could never hate her. As Yoshida still wonders why Yano avoids looking at her, a perplexed Yano slowly realises he may be in love with Yoshida after listening to Tanaka and Izumi sing about love.
6	"Love"; Transliteration: "Koi" (Japanese: 恋)	Hiroki Negishi	Hiroyuki Kishikura	Takahide Ogata	November 5, 2025 (Note: This episode aired at 1:40 a.m. JST, 11 minutes after the regular air time on Nippon TV.)
Yoshida worries about Yano becoming distant, so she asks Izumi and Yuzukawa for advice. Yoshida struggles to believe Yano reciprocates her feelings and decides to act more like the cheerful Izumi. Meanwhile, Tanaka and Yano encounter Hashiba shopping for shojo manga for his sister. Yano asks Hashiba how to approach love. Hashiba gives him the manga claiming it will answer his thoughts, and Yano spends all weekend reading it to prepare on seeing Yoshida. Yano sees Yoshida acting cheerful like in the manga, but Izumi and Yuzukawa sense Yoshida is discomforted, so she returns to normal. Yano quietly confesses to Yoshida on liking her during class, catching her off-guard. Yoshida refuses to believe Yano liking her is the same as her love for him, until she sees Yano being more positive the next day. When asked by a classmate on his type of woman, Yano bluntly answers his type is Yoshida, stunning the entire class. After Yano openly flirts with her, Yoshida demands to know what he meant by his prior confession. Yano meekly admits he does love her upon figuring out his feelings, allowing a joyful Yoshida to also confess her love to Yano.
7	"Reasons"; Transliteration: "Riyū" (Japanese: 理由)	Hidekazu Oka	Azuki Azuki	Jun Takizawa	November 12, 2025
Following their confession, Yoshida and Yano wonder on going out on a date. Yoshida overthinks on her reason to date Yano. After her younger sister's friend suggests on simply spending time with him, Yoshida asks Yano out, and he happily accepts the gesture. After school, Hashiba finds Yano drawing, and he admits he has been able to socialise more and pick up hobbies since meeting and falling in love with Yoshida. Yano thanks Hashiba on allowing him to discover himself, prompting Hashiba to quietly wish Yoshida luck on her relationship with Yano. Some time later, Yoshida and Yano go to the movies for their first date, but Yoshida grows focused on keeping Yano safe in public, causing her to not watch the whole duration of the movie. Yano shares his enjoyment of the movie, leading a relaxed Yoshida to conclude their first date is a success.
8	"Summer Festival"; Transliteration: "Natsumatsuri" (Japanese: 夏祭り)	Tōko Koike	Deko Akao	Shinpei Matsuo	November 19, 2025
An impulsive Hashiba asks Yoshida to watch a movie with him if he hits a home run in their team's baseball match despite knowing she is dating Yano, and Hashiba rescinds his request after hitting a home run. Yoshida and Yano's friend circle celebrate Hashiba's achievement by attending a summer festival. Yoshida asks Hashiba how he quickly befriended Yano, with Hashiba admitting it naturally happened. Yoshida grows jealous of their friendship when Hashiba holds Yano's hand to keep him safe. A flustered Yoshida also decides to hold his hand, but Yano senses her nervousness and excuses himself. Hashiba confides in Izumi that he will continue to admire Yoshida even as she dates Yano. Later, Yano separates from the group, worrying Yoshida. Yano reappears and gifts Yoshida a toy ring she was looking at earlier. Impressed at Yano's gesture, Hashiba admits he stands no chance against Yano. The group watches the fireworks and Yoshida hopes they can do it again next year.
9	"My Heart Is..."; Transliteration: "Shinzō ga..." (Japanese: 心臓が・・・)	Toshiyuki Sone	Satoshi Hirai	Kazuhiro Yoneda	November 26, 2025
A shy Yano asks Yoshida to study together at her house. Their friends assume it will be an intimate date, causing Yano and Yoshida to plan intently for it. Yano admits to Hashiba that his heart races around Yoshida, but a flustered Hashiba claims to have no idea what it is, causing Yano to worry he has a heart condition. Yano and Yoshida later meet for the study session, where they present themselves differently. While Yano continues to wonder why his heart races, Yoshida prepares lunch for themselves. Yano wipes ketchup from Yoshida's face after recalling Hashiba's similar gesture to her, but they become bashful at the unexpected physical contact. Yano admits during the study session that he has not decided what to do after high school, but he promises to become someone Yoshida can depend on. Yoshida and Yano part ways following the session, during which Yoshida confesses Yano has made her heart race all day. Yano is relieved that Yoshida feels the same way, but on the way home, his concerned father assumes Yano is suffering a heart attack.
10	"Birthday"; Transliteration: "Tanjōbi" (Japanese: 誕生日)	Hiroki Negishi	Deko Akao	Tetsuji Takayanagi	December 3, 2025
Yoshida and the group realize Yano's birthday will occur two days later, so they throw a surprise party. Yano is happy on celebrating his birthday with friends. Izumi and Yuzukawa send Yano on a confusing treasure hunt around school, where he finds his gift is Yoshida herself. Yoshida also gives Yano an exchange diary, and they learn about each other through a series of questions. Returning home, Yano notices Yoshida's question on why he wears an eyepatch. Although Yano tells her not to worry about his eye, Yoshida becomes curious on the circumstances. Yano begins avoiding her, so Yoshida apologizes for asking. Yano eventually admits that following an accident that rendered his covered eye getting a different color, he wears an eyepatch to avoid people judging him, though Yoshida reassures him that it is not weird. Despite this, Yano remains afraid to tell the whole story out of fear that Yoshida will distance herself from him, just as a student sees Yano and expresses no surprise on him still wearing an eyepatch.
11	"School Festival"; Transliteration: "Bunkasai" (Japanese: 文化祭)	Hidekazu Oka	Azuki Azuki	Yuta Murano	December 10, 2025
Yoshida's class decides to do a haunted house café for the approaching school festival. Yano worries he may mess up the class-work for the festival, so Hashiba puts him to work making decorations. Yano shares his joy of being involved in festival preparations, causing Hashiba to suspect something bad happened to him at a previous festival. On the day of the school festival, Yoshida, Yano, and their friends do a cosplay to promote their café. The student bumps into Yano, startling him into quickly leaving with Yoshida. Yoshida grows jealous of Yano getting photos from girls and scares them away when they ask to remove his eyepatch. They later take a selfie in their costumes which makes Yano's heart race. They start work at the café and Yano nervously attends to the student and tries avoiding her, which Yoshida notices. At the bonfire after the festival, Yuzukawa and Tanaka spread a fake urban legend where couples who hold hands during the bonfire stay together forever. Yano is afraid that holding hands might make him pass out, so they make pinkie promises instead. Yano sees the student watching him, causing him to suddenly let go of Yoshida's finger.
12	"Ordinary Days"; Transliteration: "Futsū no Hibi" (Japanese: 普通の日々)	Tōko Koike	Deko Akao	Tōko Koike	December 17, 2025
A week passes and the student introduces herself as Okamoto, a classmate of Yano from junior high. Yoshida eavesdrops on their conversation and hears Okamoto asking if Yano is still worried about a curse. Yoshida asks Yano about it, prompting Yano to reveal that his clumsiness was perceived as a curse and people avoided him back in junior high. Okamoto tried to befriend him, so when Yano uncovered his miscoloured eye, they were both injured by a falling sign. Yano's bullies spread a rumour that looking into his miscoloured eye caused harm, leading Yano to always wear his eyepatch and avoid Okamoto. Yoshida realises that Yano still believes in the rumor. Okamoto blames herself for reminding Yano of his trauma, but Yoshida insists they need to act normally around Yano to comfort him. Yano avoids all their gestures but admits he misses them. Okamoto reveals what upset her the most in junior high was Yano avoiding her when he never did anything wrong. Yano apologizes to everyone for worrying them. Okamoto is invited to join their friend group to her joy. Yano and Yoshida return to their classroom to retrieve their phones, during which Yano's eyepatch falls off by chance. Yoshida sees his miscoloured eye and remarks it as being beautiful.
