= Gen Ito =

Japanese model and actor (born 2002)

- 伊藤 絃
- Born: October 30, 2002 (age 24); Miyagi Prefecture, Japan
- Occupations: Model; actor
- Years active: 2024–present
- Agent: LesPros Entertainment
- Modeling information
- Height: 180 cm (5 ft 11 in)
- Hair color: black
- Eye color: brown

Gen Ito (伊藤 絃(いとう げん), Itō Gen; born October 30, 2002) is a Japanese model and actor.

== Career ==
In 2023, he applied for the nationwide Men's Non-no Model audition, where he was chosen as a finalist.

He then joined LesPros Entertainment after passing the "2nd LesPros Lead Role Audition" hosted by the agency in 2024. Beating approximately 4,000 other applicants despite having no prior acting experience.

In 2025, Ito was selected through an audition to play the role of Katō Kiyomasa in the NHK historical drama Brothers in Arms, marking his first role in a taiga drama. The drama began airing in January 2026. In the same month, he also debuted in the television drama series, The Faceless Patient: To Save or to Judge as the protagonist's younger brother.

== Filmography ==
=== Television ===
Year	Title	Role	Notes	Ref.
2026	The Faceless Patient: To Save or to Judge	Yuto Tsuzuki		
2026	Heartbreak Karuta	Riku Momo		
2026	Brothers in Arms	Katō Kiyomasa	Taiga drama	

=== Film ===
Year	Title	Role	Notes	Ref.
2026	Kill Your Tears, Okiharu			
