= Lonely Castle in the Mirror =

Japanese novel by Mizuki Tsujimura

- Novel cover

かがみの孤城 (Kagami no Kojō)
- Genre: Coming-of-age; Mystery; Supernatural
- Novel
- Written by: Mizuki Tsujimura
- Published by: Poplar Publishing
- English publisher: NA: Doubleday
- Published: May 11, 2017
- Manga
- Written by: Mizuki Tsujimura
- Illustrated by: Tomo Taketomi
- Published by: Shueisha
- English publisher: NA: Seven Seas Entertainment
- Imprint: Young Jump Comics
- Magazine: Ultra Jump
- Original run: June 19, 2019 – February 19, 2022
- Volumes: 5
- Anime film
- Directed by: Keiichi Hara
- Produced by: Hirotaka Aragaki; Kei Kushiyama
- Written by: Miho Maruo
- Music by: Harumi Fuuki
- Studio: A-1 Pictures
- Licensed by: NA: GKIDS; SEA: Muse Communication
- Released: December 23, 2022
- Runtime: 116 minutes
- icon

Lonely Castle in the Mirror (Japanese: かがみの孤城, Hepburn: Kagami no Kojō) is a Japanese novel written by Mizuki Tsujimura and published by Poplar Publishing in May 2017. A manga adaptation illustrated by Tomo Taketomi was serialized in Shueisha's seinen manga magazine Ultra Jump from June 2019 to February 2022, with its chapters collected in five tankōbon volumes. An anime film adaptation produced by A-1 Pictures was released on December 23, 2022.

== Plot ==
Kokoro Anzai, a first-year at Yukishina Junior High School, stays at home due to bullying. She tries attending a child development support class, but has not returned to school since. One day, she finds the magical portal within the mirror at her room. While inspecting it, she is dragged into the mirror and finds herself in front of a castle on the island surrounded by water. There, she meets a girl with a wolf mask. The self-proclaimed Wolf Queen introduces her to six other children: Subaru Nagahisa, Akiko Inoue, Rion Mizumori, Earth Masamune, Fūka Hasegawa, and Haruka Ureshino. Addressing them as Little Red Riding Hoods, the Wolf Queen instructs them to find a key hidden in the castle, which will lead them to a room where one can make a wish, before the deadline of March 30 of the following year. If anyone makes a correct wish, it will be granted and all children will lose their memories of the castle. She also tells the children to leave before 5pm. Any child who stays at the castle on the evening will be eaten by a wolf.

The seven children start spending time together at the castle, occasionally looking for the key. Kokoro learns from the other children that they all attend the same school, except for Rion, and have been avoiding school for various reasons. Planning to meet up at school, they find out that they do not exist in each other's worlds. Therefore, Masamune theorizes that they are from parallel universes, but the Wolf Queen discovers and denies this. The deadline begins to near, but they have not found the key yet. In the meantime, Kokoro has opened up to her mother about being bullied and, with the help of her teacher, tries to resolve the issue. The others have also taken steps forward.

On the second to last day, Kokoro finds an illustration titled "The Wolf and the Seven Young Goats", and realizes that this was a clue to the key's location. As she returns home, she discovers the mirror has shattered into pieces. She learns from the other children that Aki broke the rule and stayed at the castle after 5pm. The rest of them are eaten by the wolf, as their collective responsibility. Kokoro passes through the broken remnants of the mirror, and uses the clues in the illustration to find the key. She sees fragments of the memories of her friends and learn they all had suffered from various problems while attending the same school. Suffering from bullying and harassment, Aki took refuge at the castle. Kokoro uses her wish to save her friends. Upon being resurrected, Aki reconciles with them.

Before returning home and forgetting the castle, they realize that they were in fact from the same universe but from different timelines spanning over 40 years. They carve their names on the wall and separately part ways. As they pass through the mirrors, Rion confronts the Wolf Queen, and it is revealed that she is his late sister, Mio. She removes the mask and bids him farewell. Back in her own timeline, Kokoro reunites with Rion and they head to school together.

== Characters ==
Kokoro Anzai (安西 こころ, Anzai Kokoro)
Voiced by: Ami Touma (Japanese); Micah Lin (English)
A first-year junior high school girl and the last person to enter the castle through the mirror's magical portal. She comes from 2005.
Rion (リオン) / Rion Mizumori (水守 理音, Mizumori Rion)
Voiced by: Takumi Kitamura (Japanese); Huxley Westemeier (English)
A first-year junior high school boy and soccer player attending a boarding school in Hawaii. His sister died when he was a child, and he feels his parents wish to distance themselves from him in later years. Rion is the third person to arrive at the castle and comes from the same year as Kokoro. Unlike the other six children, he did not attend Yukishina Junior High, but wished to attend there, because it was the same school his sister would have attended.
Aki (アキ) / Akiko Inoue (井上 晶子, Inoue Akiko)
Voiced by: Sakura Kiryū (Japanese); Giselle Fernandez (English)
The second person to arrive at the castle, who came from 1991. A third year student at Yukishina Junior High. After avoiding her abusive stepfather and losing her boyfriend, the timeline reveals in the past that Aki changed her surname and eventually became a school counsellor.
Subaru (スバル) / Subaru Nagahisa (長久 昴, Nagahisa Subaru)
Voiced by: Rihito Itagaki (Japanese); Kieran Regan (English)
The first person to arrive at the castle, who came from 1984. Subaru is a third-year student at Yukishina Junior High. He lives with his grandparents and older brother, and suffers from emotional neglect and apathy. Inspired by Masamune, he plans to become a video game designer.
Fūka (フウカ) / Fūka Hasegawa (長谷川 風歌, Hasegawa Fūka)
Voiced by: Naho Yokomizo (Japanese); Zoe Glick (English)
A troubled pianist and the sixth person to arrive at the castle. She came from 2019 and is a second-year student at Yukishina Junior High. She is failing in school, because she feels pressure to live up to her single mother's expectations to be a pianist, especially since Fuka's mother has invested everything in the future.
Masamune (マサムネ) / Earth Masamune (政宗 青澄, Masamune Aasu)
Voiced by: Minami Takayama (Japanese); Adrian Marrero (English)
The fifth person to arrive at the castle, a boy who avidly enjoys playing video games. He came from 2012 and is a second-year student at Yukishina Junior High. His first name is "Earth".
Ureshino (ウレシノ) / Haruka Ureshino (嬉野 遥, Ureshino Haruka)
Voiced by: Yuki Kaji (Japanese); Riley Webb (English)
The fourth person to arrive at the castle, who came from 2026. A first-year student at Yukishina Junior High. He tries to form a romantic relationship with each of the girls in turn, but they are uncomfortable with his behavior and do not reciprocate. Ureshino was bullied in school as other children only hung out with him because he would pay for everyone during outings.
Wolf Queen (オオカミさま, Ōkami-sama)
Voiced by: Mana Ashida (Japanese); Vivienne Rutherford (English)
A girl with the wolf mask, revealed to be Rion's sister Mio (ミオ) (Mio Mizumori (水守 実生, Mizumori Mio), voiced by Karen Miyama). She was about to attend Yukishina Junior High, but died of an incurable illness in 1999, before she can enter the school. She appears as a ghost of the castle instructing her brother and other children that they must leave the castle before 5 PM, local time in Japan, every evening.
Kitajima-sensei (喜多嶋先生) / Akiko Kitajima (喜多嶋 晶子, Kitajima Akiko)
Voiced by: Aoi Miyazaki (Japanese); Giselle Fernandez (English)
The future version of Aki and Kokoro's school counsellor. She has also supported Fūka, Masamune, and Ureshino in the future. While training as a counsellor, she also met Mio.
Kokoro's mother (こころの母, Kokoro no Haha)
Voiced by: Kumiko Aso (Japanese); Julie Nathanson (English)
An unnamed woman helping her daughter overcome her negative emotions.
Moe Tojo (東条 萌, Tōjō Moe)
Voiced by: Anji Ikehata (Japanese); Ashley Boettcher (English)
Kokoro's friendly neighbour and a first year student at Yukishina Junior High. Her father is a folklore professor and their family has frequently moved for his research work. Although Kokoro and Moe are initially friends, Moe leaves Kokoro alone when Sanada begins to ostracize and bully Kokoro. At the end of the school year, Moe admits that she regretted not staying with Kokoro and that she had become the target of Sanada's bullying after Kokoro began staying at home. Moe's father keeps a number of folklore related illustrations and books. This allows Kokoro to solve the mystery of the castle.
Miori Sanada (真田 美織, Sanada Miori)
Voiced by: Ayaka Yoshimura (Japanese); Cassie Glow (English)
A troublemaker and a first year student, who leads the other students in ostracizing and bullying Kokoro, in an attempt to threaten and humiliate her. Kokoro does not know why Sanada chose to bully her, but she speculates that Miori was in love with Kokoro's elementary school classmate, Chuta Ikeda, and believed that he loved Kokoro.

== Media ==
=== Novel ===
Written by Mizuki Tsujimura, Lonely Castle in the Mirror was originally published by Poplar Publishing on May 11, 2017. The company re-released the novel in a two-volume paperback format in March 2021. The novel was published in English by Doubleday (UK) in April 2021 and Erewhon (US) in October 2022.

=== Manga ===
A manga adaptation illustrated by Tomo Taketomi was serialized in Shueisha's seinen manga magazine Ultra Jump from June 19, 2019, to February 19, 2022. Shueisha collected its chapters in five tankōbon volumes, published from December 2019 to May 2022.

The manga is licensed in North America by Seven Seas Entertainment.

No.	Original release date	Original ISBN	English release date	English ISBN
1	December 19, 2019	978-4-08-891450-3	November 21, 2023	979-8-88843-193-1
2	July 17, 2020	978-4-08-891612-5	February 6, 2024	979-8-88843-366-9
3	February 19, 2021	978-4-08-891782-5	June 4, 2024	979-8-88843-461-1
4	September 17, 2021	978-4-08-892101-3	October 15, 2024	979-8-88843-462-8
5	May 18, 2022	978-4-08-892305-5	February 18, 2025	979-8-88843-463-5

=== Anime film ===
An anime film adaptation was announced on February 24, 2022. It is produced by A-1 Pictures, directed by Keiichi Hara, and written by Miho Maruo, with the characters designed by chief animation director Keigo Sasaki, visual concept and castle design by Ilya Kuvshinov, and music composed by Harumi Fuuki. Yuuri performed the film's theme song "Merry-Go-Round" (メリーゴーランド). The film was released in Japan by Shochiku on December 23, 2022. GKIDS acquired the rights to the film in North America, and screened it in Japanese and English-language formats in June 2023. The film premiered on television for the first time on Nippon TV's Kin'yō Road Show programming block on February 9, 2024.

== Reception ==
The novel placed first in the novel category of Da Vinci magazine's "Book of the Year" list in 2017. It won the Japan Booksellers' Award in 2018.

The anime film adaptation debuted at 6th at the Japanese box office, earning ¥140 million ($1.05 million) on its opening weekend. It was well-received by audience, and was rated 3.94 out of 5 on its first day on Filmarks. Richard Eisenbeis of Anime News Network gave the film a 'B-', applauding its social commentary on bullying in Japan and its relatable cast of characters, but criticizing its plot twists, which are 'easy to see coming'. Writing for The Japan Times, Matt Schley gave the film 3 out of 5 stars, praising its social commentary and its characters as well while criticizing the direction of the film, which 'lacks anything resembling subtlety', noting its 'overbearing' soundtrack 'commanding its audience to feel at any given moment'. In 2023, the film was nominated for Animation of the Year at the 46th Japan Academy Film Prize.
