= Hara Nagayori =

Japanese samurai

Hara Nagayori (原 長頼, 1544 – November 18, 1600) was a Japanese samurai lord of the Sengoku through late Azuchi-Momoyama periods. He served as an officer under the Oda clan. At first, he was attached to Maeda Toshiie.

After Oda Nobunaga's death during 1582, Nagayori served Shibata Katsuie and fought against Toyotomi Hideyoshi at Battle of Shizugatake. After Katsuie met his death, Nagayori went on to serve under Maeda Toshimasa, and Hidenaga.

In 1600, Nagayori sided with Ishida Mitsunari during the Battle of Sekigahara, but ended up being defeated. Nagayori had Mitsunari executed to assume the responsibility for the event.
