= 2025 All Japan High School Soccer Tournament =

All Japan JFA 104th High School Soccer Tournament

Tournament details
- Country: Japan
- Dates: 28 December 2025 – 12 January 2026
- Teams: 48

Tournament statistics
- Matches played: 47

The 2025 All Japan High School Soccer Tournament (第104回全国高等学校サッカー選手権大会; All Japan JFA 104th High School Soccer Tournament) will be the 104th edition of the referred annually contested cup for High Schools over Japan, being contested by the winning schools of the 48 prefectural qualifications. The defending champions are Maebashi Ikuei, who won the previous tournament beating in the final Chiba's RKU Kashiwa on penalty shoot-outs. As the norm, from the first round to the quarterfinals, matches have a duration of 80 minutes, split into two halves of 40 minutes each. The semi-finals and the final, however, are the only ones to match the standard match length of professional football, with the duration of 90 minutes, split into two halves of 45 minutes each. During the tournament, should a match be tied, it directly requires penalty shoot-outs, except for the final, where extra-time is played if the match remains tied on regulation time.

The entire tournament, including the prefectural tournament finals, will be streamed on SPORTS BULL and TVer free of charge for Japanese IP only. On TV, the semi-finals and the final will be aired nationally on NTV, while NNN, NNS and other non-NTV network stations showed select matches from the first round to the quarterfinals.

== Calendar ==
The tournament takes place in a 15-day span, with the tournament split into a total of six stages, with each round's dates announced by the JFA on 17 November.

Round	Date	Matches	Clubs
First round	28–29 December 2025	16	32 (32) → 16
Second round	31 December 2025	16	32 (16+16) → 16
Round of 16	2 January 2026	8	16 → 8
Quarter-finals	4 January 2026	4	8 → 4
Semi-finals	10 January 2026	2	4 → 2
Final	12 January 2026	1	2 → 1

== Venues ==
The tournament is held in the Kanto region, with the nine venues located on four prefectures.

2024 All Japan High School Soccer Tournament venues
Shinjuku, Tokyo	Setagaya, Tokyo	Kita, Tokyo
MUFG Stadium	Komazawa Olympic Park Stadium	Ajinomoto Field Nishigaoka
Capacity: 68,698	Capacity: 20,010	Capacity: 7,258
Kawasaki, Kanagawa	Yokohama, Kanagawa	Saitama, Saitama
Uvance Todoroki Stadium by Fujitsu	NHK Spring Mitsuzawa Football Stadium	Urawa Komaba Stadium
Capacity: 26,232	Capacity: 15,454	Capacity: 21,500
Chiba, Chiba	Kashiwa, Chiba	Saitama, Saitama
Fukuda Denshi Arena	ZA Oripri Stadium	NACK5 Stadium Omiya
Capacity: 19,781	Capacity: 14,051	Capacity: 15,491

== Qualifying rounds ==
All the 47 prefectures holds knockout stage qualifiers for their respective high schools. Tokyo's qualifiers is the only to qualify two teams to the competition, as they have the largest amount of registered high schools affiliated with the All-Japan High School Soccer Federation. Teams playing at higher-level leagues earns a bye from the early stages of their respective qualifiers, getting automatically seeded in more advanced rounds, usually between the 3rd and 4th round of their qualifiers.

Most of the qualifiers started on October. Prefectures with a large amount of registered high schools, like Chiba and Kanagawa, started their qualifiers earlier than the rest.

Information about the broadcasts of the semi-finals and finals of each of the prefectural qualifiers was published by NTV.

== Participating schools ==
Prefecture	High School	League	L.	Apps.
Hokkaido	Hokkai High School	Hokkaido Prince League	2	14th
Aomori	Aomori Yamada High School	Premier League East	1	31st
Iwate	Senshu Univ. Kitakami High School	Tohoku Prince League	2	4th
Miyagi	Seiwa Gakuen High School	Tohoku Prince League	2	6th
Akita	Akita Shogyo High School	Akita Football League	4	47th
Yamagata	Yamagata Meisei High School	Yamagata Football League	4	2nd
Fukushima	Shoshi High School	Tohoku Prince League	2	16th
Ibaraki	Kashima Gakuen High School	Kanto Prince League D1	2	6th
Tochigi	Yaita Chuo High School	Kanto Prince League D1	2	15th
Gunma	Maebashi Ikuei High School	Premier League East	1	28th
Saitama	Shohei High School	Premier League East	1	7th
Chiba	Ryutsu Keizai Univ. Kashiwa High School	Premier League East	1	9th
Tokyo	Waseda Jitsugyo High School	Tokyo T2 League	5	2nd
Tokyo	Horikoshi High School	Tokyo T1 League	4	6th
Kanagawa	Nihon Univ. Fujisawa High School	Kanagawa Football League	4	8th
Yamanashi	Yamanashi Gakuin High School	Kanto Prince League D1	2	11th
Nagano	Ueda Nishi High School	Nagano Football League	4	4th
Niigata	Teikyo Nagaoka High School	Premier League West	1	11th
Toyama	Toyama Daiichi High School	Hokushin'etsu Prince League D2	3	35th
Ishikawa	Kanazawa Gakuin Univ. High School	Hokushin'etsu Prince League D2	3	2nd
Fukui	Fukui Shogyo High School	Fukui Football League	4	3rd
Shizuoka	Hamamatsu Kaisei-kan High School	Tokai Prince League	2	3rd
Aichi	Tokai Gakuen High School	Aichi Football League	4	5th
Mie	Uji-Yamada Shogyo High School	Mie Football League	4	2nd
Gifu	Teikyo Univ. Kani High School	Tokai Prince League	2	12th
Shiga	Minakuchi High School	Shiga Football League	4	16th
Kyoto	Kyoto Tachibana High School	Kansai Prince League D1	2	12th
Osaka	Kokoku High School	Kansai Prince League D1	2	2nd
Hyogo	Kobe Koryo Gakuen High School	Kansai Prince League D1	2	13th
Nara	Nara Ikuei High School	Nara Football League	4	18th
Wakayama	Hatsushiba Hashimoto High School	Wakayama Football League	4	18th
Tottori	Yonago Kita High School	Chugoku Prince League	2	21st
Shimane	Taisha High School	Shimane Football League	4	12th
Okayama	Okayama Gakugeikan High School	Chugoku Prince League	2	8th
Hiroshima	Hiroshima Minami High School	Chugoku Prince League	2	18th
Yamaguchi	Takagawa Gakuen High School	Chugoku Prince League	2	31st
Kagawa	Takamatsu Shogyo High School	Kagawa Football League	4	25th
Tokushima	Tokushima Municipal High School	Shikoku Prince League	2	22nd
Ehime	Nitta High School	Ehime Football League	4	4th
Kochi	Kochi High School	Shikoku Prince League	2	20th
Fukuoka	Higashi Fukuoka High School	Premier League West	1	24th
Saga	Saga Higashi High School	Kyushu Prince League D2	3	15th
Nagasaki	Kyushu Bunka Gakuen High School	Nagasaki Football League	4	1st
Kumamoto	Ohzu High School	Premier League West	1	22nd
Oita	Oita Tsurusaki High School	Oita Football League	4	8th
Miyazaki	Nissho Gakuen High School	Kyushu Prince League D1	2	19th
Kagoshima	Kamimura Gakuen High School	Premier League West	1	12th
Okinawa	Naha Nishi High School	Okinawa Football League	4	19th

== Schedule ==
All matches kick-offs are on JST +09:00.

=== First round ===
28 December 1	Waseda Jitsugyo (Tokyo)	1–4	(Tokushima Prefecture) Tokushima Municipal	Shinjuku
14:30	Yuma Shinoda 80+3'	Report	Midori Yoshida 36'; Yuichiro Kashiwagi 42'; Ren Shoji 55'; Takato Yamamoto 73'	Stadium: Japan National Stadium; Attendance: 18,364; Referee: Yusuke Ohashi

29 December 2	Shoshi (Fukushima Prefecture)	6–0	(Kagawa Prefecture) Takamatsu Shogyo	Saitama
14:10	Ryuma Matsuzawa 3'; Shota Negi 9', 10'; Daiki Oka 73'; Sogo Usui 74'; Mahiro Tagami 75'	Report		Stadium: Urawa Komaba Stadium

29 December 3	Yamanashi Gakuin (Yamanashi Prefecture)	0–0 (6–5 p)	(Kyoto Prefecture) Kyoto Tachibana	Saitama
12:05		Report		Stadium: Urawa Komaba Stadium

29 December 4	Fukui Shogyo (Fukui Prefecture)	0–3	(Yamaguchi Prefecture) Takagawa Gakuen	Saitama
14:10		Report	Toa Harada 19'; Azuki Okito 30'; Sogo Yokota 40'	Stadium: NACK5 Stadium Omiya

29 December 5	Teikyo Nagaoka (Niigata Prefecture)	5–0	(Shimane Prefecture) Taisha	Saitama
12:05	Shion Higuchi 40'; Nasuki Misuzawa 44'; Hinata Wajiki 65', 73'; Ko Uchida 80+1'	Report		Stadium: NACK5 Stadium Omiya

29 December 6	Senshu Univ. Kitakami (Iwate Prefecture)	1–2	(Hiroshima Prefecture) Hiroshima Minami	Yokohama
12:05	Taiyo Hirayama 57'	Report	Riro Nomura 18'; Hinata Uno 34'	Stadium: NHK Spring Mitsuzawa Football Stadium

29 December 7	Ueda Nishi (Nagano Prefecture)	0–1	(Shiga Prefecture) Minakuchi	Yokohama
14:10		Report	Ryota Nakai 76'	Stadium: NHK Spring Mitsuzawa Football Stadium

29 December 8	Seiwa Gakuen (Miyagi Prefecture)	3–0	(Okinawa Prefecture) Naha Nishi	Kita
12:05	Takeru Endo 47'; Yuito Kosugi 62'; Ichiya Kawakami 80+2'	Report		Stadium: Ajinomoto Field Nishigaoka

29 December 9	Teikyo Kani (Gifu Prefecture)	0–2	(Osaka Prefecture) Kokoku	Kawasaki
12:05		Report	Hiroto Yasuda 57', 63'	Stadium: Uvance Todoroki Stadium by Fujitsu

29 December 10	Hamamatsu Kaiseikan (Shizuoka Prefecture)	2–0	(Nagasaki Prefecture) Kyushu Bunka Gakuen	Kawasaki
14:10	Reiru Munakata 14', 27'	Report		Stadium: Uvance Todoroki Stadium by Fujitsu

29 December 11	Kanazawa Gakuin (Ishikawa Prefecture)	2–1	(Miyazaki Prefecture) Nissho Gakuen	Setagaya
12:05	Rintaro Yabe 26', 33'	Report	Haruki Ohira 28'	Stadium: Komazawa Olympic Park Stadium

29 December 12	Kashima Gakuen (Ibaraki Prefecture)	7–0	(Shimane Prefecture) Nitta	Setagaya
14:10	Kosei Nakagawa 32', 43'; Haruto Miura 40'; Shintaro Utsumi 53'; Hayato Watanabe 56'; Tsukasa Sakai 60', 64'	Report		Stadium: Komazawa Olympic Park Stadium

29 December 13	Aomori Yamada (Aomori Prefecture)	5–0	(Wakayama Prefecture) Hatsushiba Hashimoto	Chiba
12:05	Daiki Sugiyama 9'; Hikaru Oba 24'; Takumi Imada 69'; Ren Oyamada 79'; Yuito Kuwabara 80+4'	Report		Stadium: Fukuda Denshi Arena

29 December 14	Hokkai (Hokkaido)	1–7	(Kumamoto Prefecture) Ohzu	Chiba
14:10	Ryowa Nishigaki 4'	Report	Kotaro Yamashita 23'; Shinnosuke Kaichi 29'; Tsubasa Yamamoto 37'; Hideaki Matsuno 55'; Kyoji Fukushima 58'; Sota Arimura 77'; Kei Murakami 80+4'	Stadium: Fukuda Denshi Arena

29 December 15	Yaita Chuo (Tochigi Prefecture)	2–2 (2–3 p)	(Nara Prefecture) Nara Ikuei	Chiba
12:05	Takumi Hirano 20'; Matias Takeuchi 80+3'	Report	Haruto Yokota 16'; Ringo Kojimoto 60'	Stadium: ZA Oripri Stadium

29 December 16	Yamagata Meisei (Yamagata Prefecture)	1–3	(Ōita Prefecture) Oita Tsurusaki	Chiba
14:10	Hijiri Harukawa 39'	Report	Toshiki Nakanishi 30'; Shio Yamashita 35'; Ayumu Kawano 76'	Stadium: ZA Oripri Stadium

=== Second round ===
31 December 17	Maebashi Ikuei (Gunma Prefecture)	1–2	(Hyōgo Prefecture) Kobe Koryo Gakuen	Saitama
12:05	Aoba Seki 71'	Report	Itsuki Ike 15', 40'	Stadium: Urawa Komaba Stadium

31 December 18	Shoshi (Fukushima Prefecture)	2–1	(Yamanashi Prefecture) Yamanashi Gakuin	Saitama
14:10	Mahiro Tagami 23', 37'	Report	Sho Hikida 75'	Stadium: Urawa Komaba Stadium

31 December 19	Takagawa Gakuen (Hyōgo Prefecture)	2–2 (3–4 p)	(Niigata Prefecture) Teikyo Nagaoka	Saitama
14:10	Shiki Shoji 38'; Azuki Okito 40+1'	Report	Nasuki Misuzawa 80+1'; Masaki Koyama 80+2'	Stadium: NACK5 Stadium Omiya

31 December 20	Shohei (Saitama Prefecture)	4–0	(Kōchi Prefecture) Kochi	Saitama
12:05	Gota Yamaguchi 7'; Ryuki Osa 17', 50'; Aoi Iijima 36'	Report		Stadium: NACK5 Stadium Omiya

31 December 21	Tokai Gakuen (Aichi Prefecture)	0–6	(Kagoshima Prefecture) Kamimura Gakuen	Yokohama
12:05		Report	Yuga Kuranaka 19'; Hajime Hidaka 25', 33', 54'; Masato Araki 28'; Yuta Sasaki 65'	Stadium: NHK Spring Mitsuzawa Football Stadium

31 December 22	Hiroshima Minami (Hiroshima Prefecture)	1–3	(Shiga Prefecture) Minakuchi	Yokohama
14:10	Seina Kubota 28'	Report	Ren Yamamoto 7'; Kohei Oka 12'; Haruki Shigeta 54'	Stadium: NHK Spring Mitsuzawa Football Stadium

31 December 23	Seiwa Gakuen (Miyagi Prefecture)	3–1	(Tokushima Prefecture) Tokushima Municipal	Kawasaki
14:10	Reo Goto 25'; Yuito Fuse 54'; Rio Shiota 73'	Report	Yuichiro Kashiwagi 34'	Stadium: Uvance Todoroki Stadium by Fujitsu

31 December 24	Okayama Gakugeikan (Okayama Prefecture)	0–2	(Kanagawa Prefecture) Nihon Fujisawa	Kawasaki
12:05		Report	Keisuke Arikawa 55', 74'	Stadium: Uvance Todoroki Stadium by Fujitsu

31 December 25	Higashi Fukuoka (Fukuoka Prefecture)	6–0	(Akita Prefecture) Akita Shogyo	Kita
12:05	Rukia Saito 9', 45', 57'; Daiki Tsukasaki 21'; ? 63' (o.g.); Shoki Hosono 78'	Report		Stadium: Ajinomoto Field Nishigaoka

31 December 26	Kokoku (Osaka Prefecture)	1–1 (3–1 p)	(Shizuoka Prefecture) Hamamatsu Kaiseikan	Kita
14:10	Toshiya Matsuoka 2'	Report	Issa Mabuchi 59'	Stadium: Ajinomoto Field Nishigaoka

31 December 27	Kanazawa Gakuin (Ishikawa Prefecture)	0–1	(Ibaraki Prefecture) Kashima Gakuen	Setagaya
12:05		Report	Saku Shimizu 54'	Stadium: Komazawa Olympic Park Stadium

31 December 28	Horikoshi (Tokyo)	9–0	(Mie Prefecture) Uji-Yamada Shogyo	Setagaya
14:10	Sota Mikamo 23', 51'; Kosei Taniguchi 37', 57', 67'; Ose Hamaoka 55'; Mitsuki Sugimura 69'; Riku Takahashi 75'; Ren Hirata 79'	Report		Stadium: Komazawa Olympic Park Stadium

31 December 29	Toyama Daiichi (Toyama Prefecture)	3–0	(Saga Prefecture) Saga Higashi	Chiba
14:10	Reiya Fujita 6'; Ryuto Yonemoto 8'; Raimu Suzuki 72'	Report		Stadium: ZA Oripri Stadium

31 December 30	Aomori Yamada (Aomori Prefecture)	0–2	(Kumamoto Prefecture) Ohzu	Chiba
14:10		Report	Tsubasa Yamamoto 48'; Kei Murakami 68'	Stadium: Fukuda Denshi Arena

31 December 31	Nara Ikuei (Nara Prefecture)	0–1	(Ōita Prefecture) Oita Tsurusaki	Chiba
12:05		Report	Shio Yamashita 26'	Stadium: ZA Oripri Stadium

31 December 32	Yonago Kita (Tottori Prefecture)	0–3	(Chiba Prefecture) RKU Kashiwa	Chiba
12:05		Report	Soma Furukawa 15', 21'; Sota Ofuji 45'	Stadium: Fukuda Denshi Arena

=== Round of 16 ===
2 January 33	Kobe Koryo Gakuen (Hyōgo Prefecture)	0–1	(Fukushima Prefecture) Shoshi	Saitama
12:05		Report	Sogo Usui 80+4'	Stadium: Urawa Komaba Stadium

2 January 34	Teikyo Nagaoka (Niigata Prefecture)	1–0	(Saitama Prefecture) Shohei	Saitama
14:10	Shion Higuchi 15'	Report		Stadium: Urawa Komaba Stadium

2 January 35	Kamimura Gakuen (Kagoshima Prefecture)	4–0	(Shiga Prefecture) Minakuchi	Kawasaki
12:05	Yuga Kuranaka 29'; Ryoma Hosoyamada 42'; Hajime Hidaka 46', 58'	Report		Stadium: Uvance Todoroki Stadium by Fujitsu

2 January 36	Seiwa Gakuen (Miyagi Prefecture)	1–2	(Kanagawa Prefecture) Nihon Fujisawa	Kawasaki
14:10	Yuito Fuse 40+1'	Report	Keito Noguchi 30'; Mahiro Sugisaki 59'	Stadium: Uvance Todoroki Stadium by Fujitsu

2 January 37	Higashi Fukuoka (Fukuoka Prefecture)	2–2 (4–5 p)	(Osaka Prefecture) Kokoku	Setagaya
12:05	Rukia Saito 26'; Rei Yamaguchi 47'	Report	Sakuto Takemura 70'; Ginji Sasa 80+3'	Stadium: Komazawa Olympic Park Stadium

2 January 38	Kashima Gakuen (Ibaraki Prefecture)	4–1	(Tokyo) Horikoshi	Setagaya
14:10	Shintaro Utsumi 32', 73'; Saku Shimizu 65'; Tsukasa Sakai 76'	Report	Eito Yokoo 34'	Stadium: Komazawa Olympic Park Stadium

2 January 39	Toyama Daiichi (Toyama Prefecture)	1–2	(Kumamoto Prefecture) Ohzu	Chiba
14:10	Sena Yamada 67'	Report	Kei Murakami 71'; Kotaro Yamashita 80+6'	Stadium: Fukuda Denshi Arena

2 January 40	Oita Tsurusaki (Ōita Prefecture)	1–5	(Chiba Prefecture) RKU Kashiwa	Chiba
12:05	Shio Yamashita 22'	Report	Kishin Shimatani 33'; Ruku Kaneko 42', 64', 80+1'; Soma Furukawa 80+3'	Stadium: Fukuda Denshi Arena

=== Quarter-finals ===
4 January 41	Shoshi (Fukushima Prefecture)	1–0	(Niigata Prefecture) Teikyo Nagaoka	Saitama
12:05	Sogo Usui 61'	Report		Stadium: Urawa Komaba Stadium

4 January 42	Kamimura Gakuen (Kagoshima Prefecture)	4–1	(Kanagawa Prefecture) Nihon Fujisawa	Kawasaki
14:10	Yuga Kuranaka 29', 53', 63', 65'	Report	Subaru Kobayashi 57'	Stadium: Uvance Todoroki Stadium by Fujitsu

4 January 43	Kokoku (Osaka Prefecture)	1–3	(Ibaraki Prefecture) Kashima Gakuen	Kawasaki
12:05	Tenjin Tokuhara 75'	Report	Saku Shimizu 17', 63'; Haruto Miura 46'	Stadium: Uvance Todoroki Stadium by Fujitsu

4 January 44	Ohzu (Kumamoto Prefecture)	1–2	(Chiba Prefecture) RKU Kashiwa	Saitama
14:10	Tsubasa Yamamoto 21'	Report	Ruku Kaneko 26'; Simon Yu Mendy 34'	Stadium: Urawa Komaba Stadium

=== Semi-finals ===
10 January 45	Shoshi (Fukushima Prefecture)	1–1 (8–9 p)	(Kagoshima Prefecture) Kamimura Gakuen	Shinjuku
12:05	Daiki Oka 5'	Report	Hajime Hidaka 73'	Stadium: Japan National Stadium

10 January 46	Kashima Gakuen (Ibaraki Prefecture)	1–0	(Chiba Prefecture) RKU Kashiwa	Shinjuku
14:20	Katsu Wazi Javen 90'	Report		Stadium: Japan National Stadium

=== Final ===
12 January 47	Kamimura Gakuen (Kagoshima Prefecture)	3–0	(Ibaraki Prefecture) Kashima Gakuen	Shinjuku
14:05	Hajime Hidaka 19'; Eita Horinoguchi 31'; Yuta Sasaki 90+2'	Report		Stadium: Japan National Stadium; Attendance: 60,142; Referee: Nagamine Koki
