= Hirano Nagayasu =

Samurai retainer

- 平野 長泰
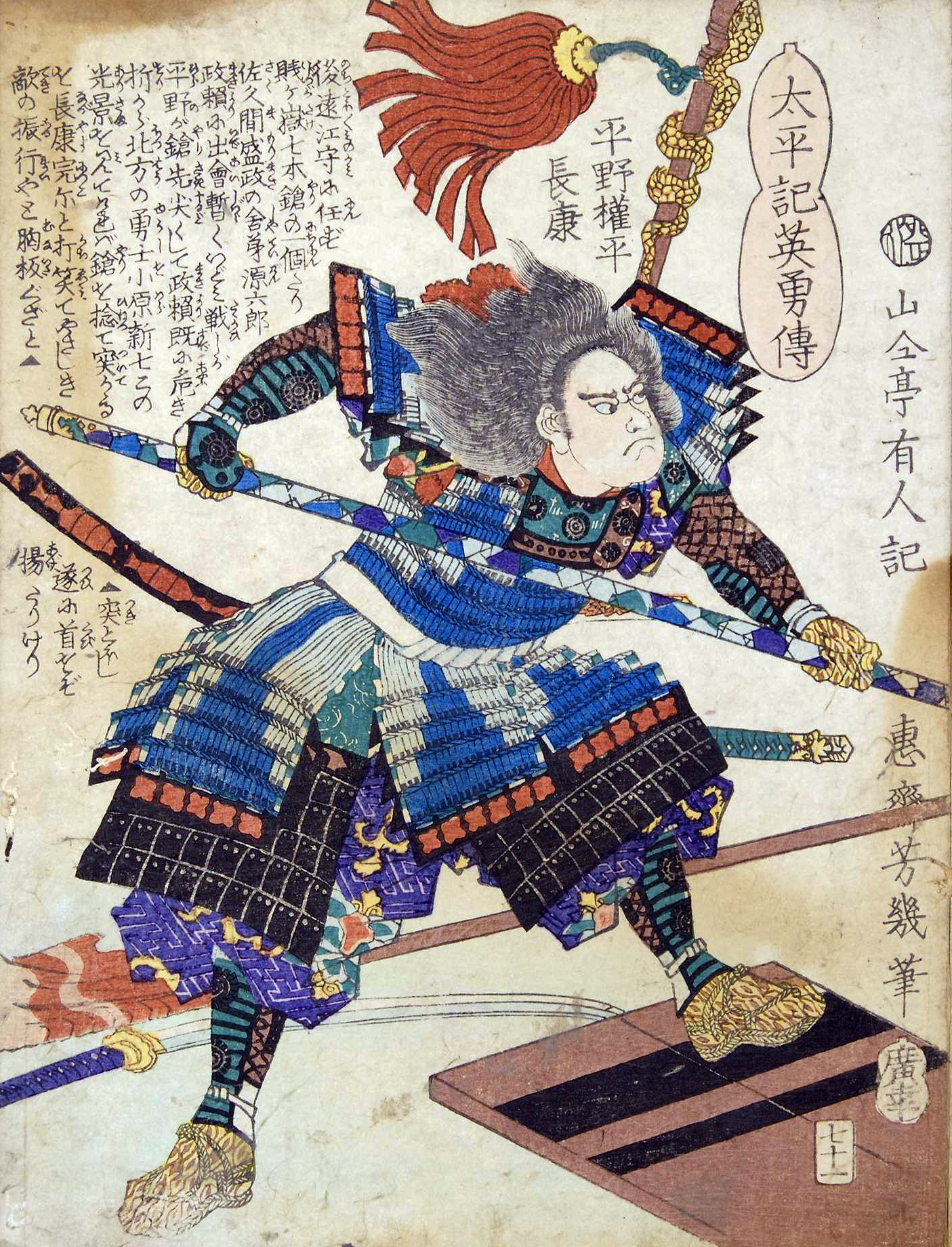
- Portrait of Hirano Nagayasu from Utagawa Yoshiiku's Heroes of the Taiheiki
- Born: 1559
- Died: 1628 (aged: 68-69)
- Military career
- Allegiance: Toyotomi clan Eastern Army; Tokugawa shogunate
- Rank: Hatamoto
- Conflicts: Battle of Shizugatake; Battle of Sekigahara; Siege of Osaka

Hirano Nagayasu (平野 長泰; 1559 – 1628) was a samurai retainer to Japanese warlord Toyotomi Hideyoshi during the Azuchi-Momoyama period of the 17th century. He was known as one of the "Seven Spears of Shizugatake".

Following the Battle of Shizugatake in 1583, Nagayasu came to be known as one of the shichi-hon-yari (七本槍), or Seven Spears of Shizugatake, whom were among Hideyoshi's most trusted generals. Owing to his achievement in that battle, he was rewarded with 3,000 additional koku.

In 1600, he fought alongside the Tokugawa Ieyasu's Eastern Army at the Battle of Sekigahara.

In 1614, he changed sides once again, requesting to serve under the Toyotomi clan in the Siege of Osaka, but was denied.

Nagayasu became a hatamoto in the Edo period.
