= Nakagawa Kiyohide =

Japanese warlord (daimyō; 1542–1583)

- 中川 清秀
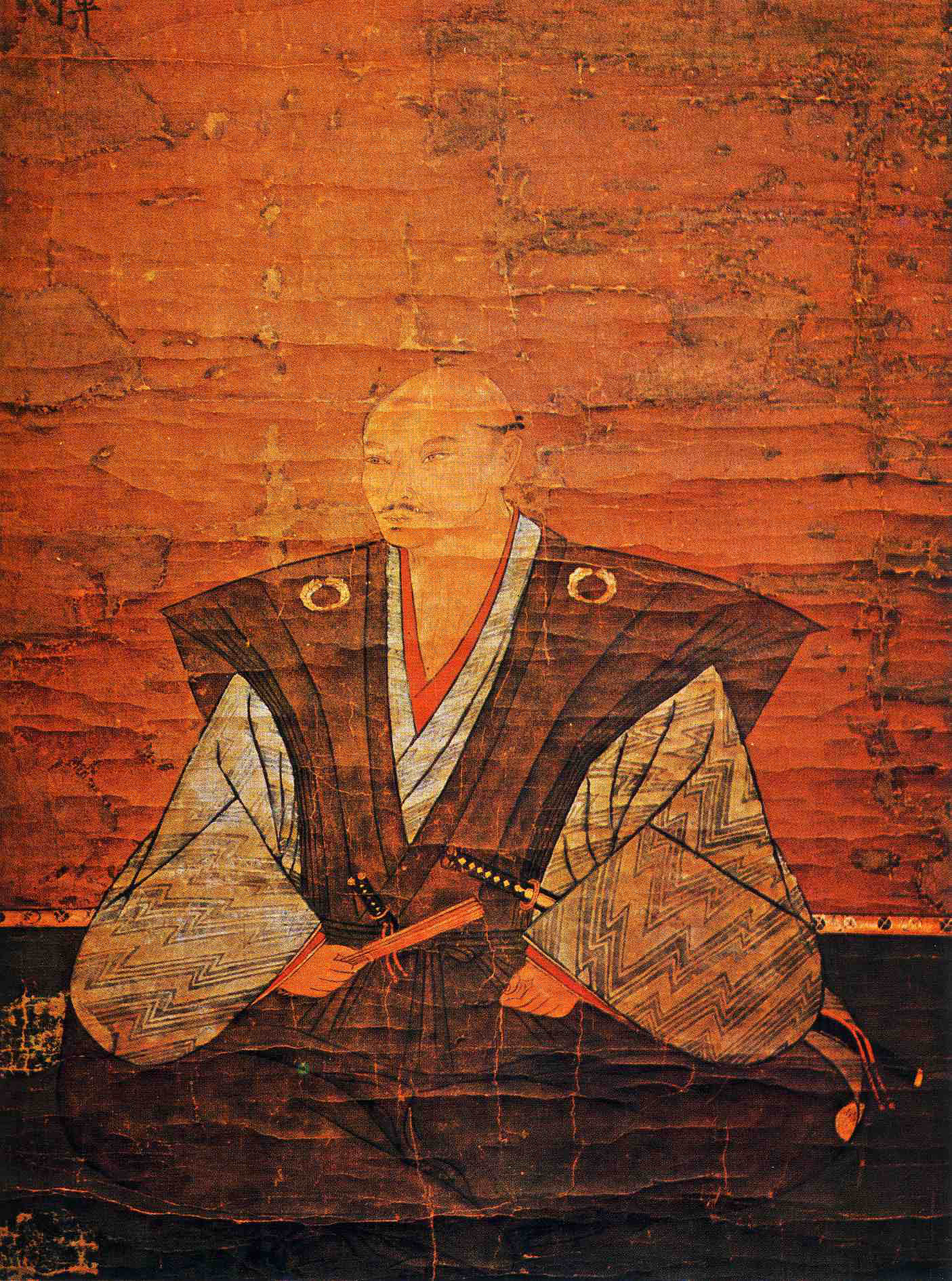
- Born: 1542; Settsu province
- Died: June 10, 1583 (aged 40–41); Shizugatake, Ōmi Province
- Children: Nakagawa Hidemasa; Nakagawa Hidenari
- Relatives: Nakagawa Shigekiyo (father)
- Military career
- Allegiance: Oda clan Toyotomi clan
- Conflicts: Settsu Campaign; Siege of Itami (1579); Battle of Shiraigawara (1571); Battle of Yamazaki (1582); Battle of Shizugatake (1583)

Nakagawa Kiyohide (中川 清秀; 1542 – June 10, 1583) was a daimyō in Azuchi–Momoyama period. His childhood name was Nakagawa Toranosuke (中川 虎之助). His common name was Nakagawa Sebe (中川 瀬兵衛).

== Biography ==
His father was Nakagawa Shigekiyo. Nakagawa Hidemasa and Nakagawa Hidenari were his sons. Furuta Oribe's wife was Kiyohide's young sister. At first, Kiyohide served Ikeda Katsumasa, who was from a powerful clan in Settsu Province. He became independent along with Araki Murashige and Takayama Ukon at Settsu Province afterward.

When Oda Nobunaga marched his armies into Kyoto, Kiyohide surrendered and served him. In 1571, Kiyohide and Murashige killed Wada Koremasa a senior retainer of Ashikaga Shogunate at Battle of Shiraigawara.

In 1578, when Murashige rebelled against Nobunaga, Kiyohide, acting in concert, also rebelled. However, when Nobunaga came to attack with a large army, Kiyohide surrendered and attacked Murashige instead. After Murashige has been defeated, Kiyohide took part in various battles under Niwa Nagashige and Ikeda Tsuneoki.

In 1582, he served Hashiba Hideyoshi after Nobunaga died, and was active in the Battle of Yamazaki.

In 1583, he was the second vanguard of Hideyoshi's force at the Battle of Shizugatake, and held Oiwayama-fort (Oiwayama-toride, 大岩山砦) with Takayama Ukon and Miyoshi Hidetsugu. He was fought against Sakuma Morimasa, who was a brave military commander of Shibata Katsuie.

== Death and legacy ==
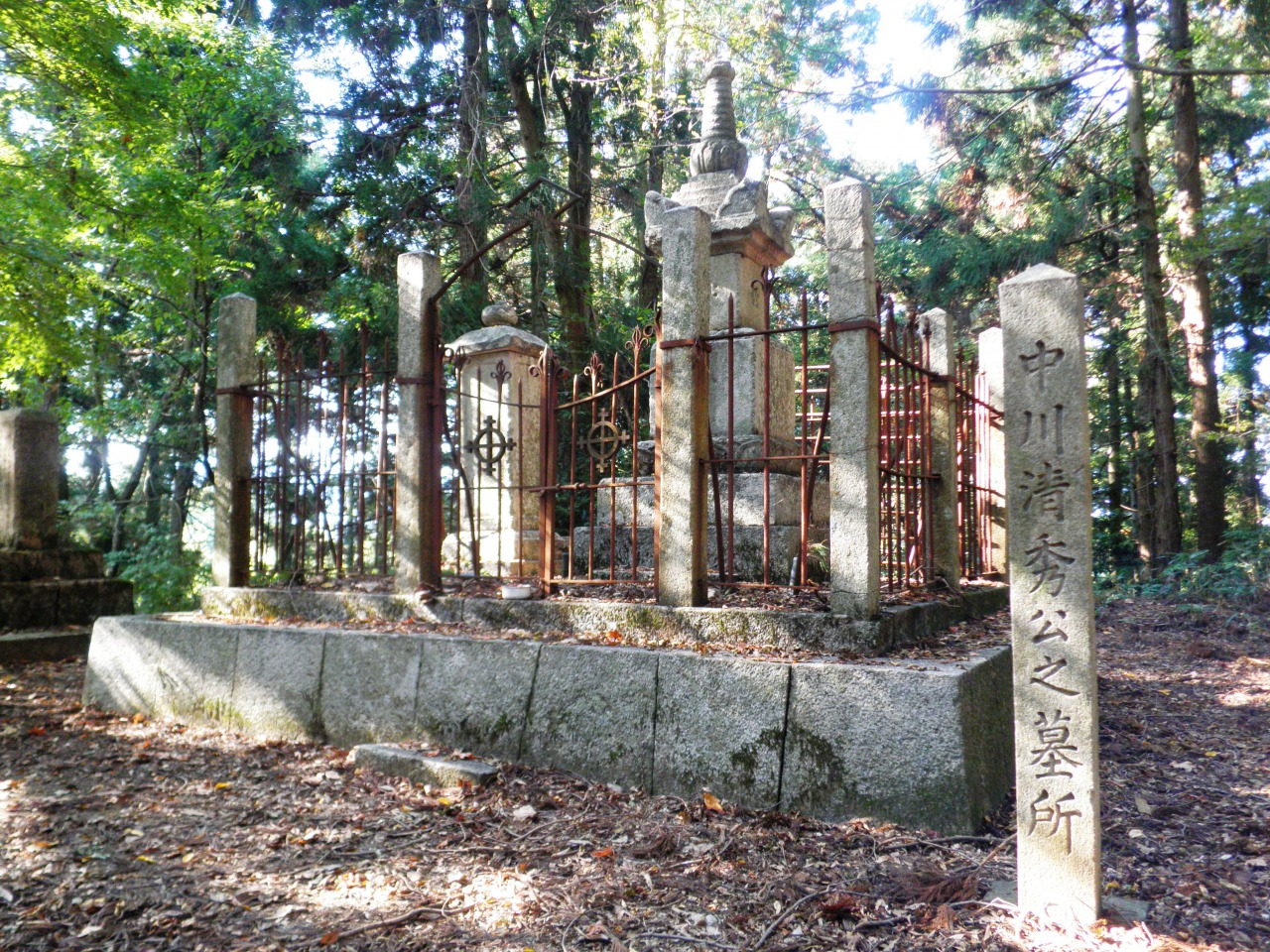
Grave of Nakagawa Kiyohide

Kiyohide was killed by Sakuma Morimasa during the Battle of Shizugatake. His grave is at Bairin-ji (梅林寺), Ibaraki, Osaka Prefecture.

His second son, Nakagawa Hidenari, became the first leader of the Oka clan at Bungo Province afterwards. The Oka clan continued until the Meiji period.

The Takeda Bell is dedicated to Nakagawa Kiyohide.
