= Menjō Katsuteru =

Menjō Katsuteru (毛受家照, died 1583), also known as Menju Katsusuke, was a general and retainer of Shibata Katsuie. As one of the Three Famous Swordsmen of the Battle of Shizugatake, he fought with outstanding valor until he was killed in battle.
