= Battle of Shizugatake =

1583 battle in feudal Japan

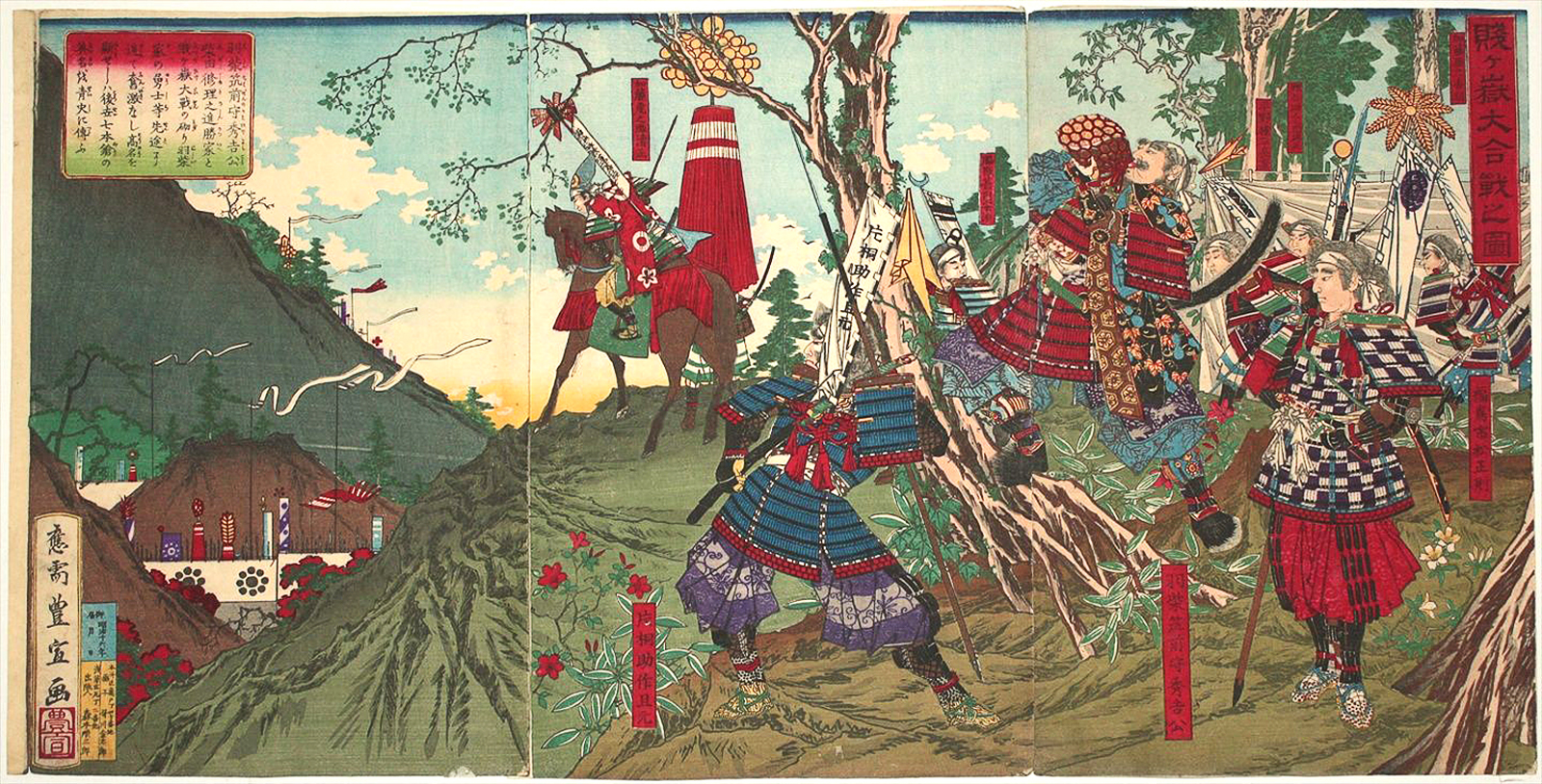
- Ukiyo-e print of the Battle of Shizugatake by Utagawa Toyonobu
Date	June 10–11, 1583
Location	Nagahama, Ōmi Province, Japan 35°30′21″N 136°11′34″E
Result	Decisive Hideyoshi victory

Belligerents
Forces of Hashiba Hideyoshi and Oda Nobukatsu	Forces of Shibata Katsuie and Oda Nobutaka

Commanders and leaders
Hashiba Hideyoshi; Oda Nobukatsu; Niwa Nagahide; Ikeda Tsuneoki; Ikoma Chikamasa; Nakagawa Kiyohide †; Hashiba Hidenaga; Hashiba Hidekatsu; Hashiba Hidetsugu; Hori Hidemasa; Katō Yoshiaki; Fukushima Masanori; Katagiri Katsumoto; Katō Kiyomasa; Horio Yoshiharu; Takayama Ukon; Kuroda Yoshitaka; Kuwayama Shigeharu; Gamō Ujisato; Akamatsu Norifusa	Shibata Katsuie †; Oda Nobutaka †; Takigawa Kazumasu; Sakuma Morimasa †; Shibata Katsumasa; Shibata Katsutoyo; Fuwa Naomitsu; Anegakōji Yoritsuna; Hara Nagayori; Ogawa Suketada; Murai Nagayori defected: Maeda Toshiie; Maeda Toshimasu; Maeda Toshinaga; Kanamori Nagachika

Strength
50,000 men	30,000 men

Casualties and losses
4,000–6,000	8,000
- Location within Shiga Prefecture Battle of Shizugatake (Japan)

The Battle of Shizugatake (賤ヶ岳の戦い, Shizugatake no Tatakai) took place during the Sengoku period of Japan between Toyotomi Hideyoshi (then Hashiba Hideyoshi) and Shibata Katsuie in Nagahama, Ōmi Province over a period of two days beginning on the 20th day of the fourth month of Tenshō 11 (equivalent to 10-11 June 1583 on the Gregorian calendar). Katsuie supported Oda Nobutaka's claim as successor of Oda Nobunaga in a succession dispute within the Oda clan that benefitted Hideyoshi.

Katsuie and Sakuma Morimasa attacked fortifications loyal to Hideyoshi at Shizugatake, defeating Nakagawa Kiyohide, but the other sieges by Toshiie and Kazumasu stalled. Katsuie ordered Sakuma to retreat but was ignored, and Hideyoshi launched a surprise counterattack that routed Sakuma and forced him to retreat. Hideyoshi pursued Sakuma and successfully besieged Kitanosho Castle which led to the suicide of Katsuie and Oichi.

The Battle of Shizugatake allowed Hideyoshi to consolidate his position as Oda Nobunaga's successor, and was one of the last challenges to his rule along with the Battle of Komaki and Nagakute in 1584. George Sansom states the Battle of Shizugatake "must be regarded as one of the decisive battles in Japanese history."

== Background ==
=== Kiyosu conference ===
In June 1582, Oda Nobunaga, the most powerful daimyō in Japan, and his eldest son and heir Oda Nobutada were killed at the Honno-ji Incident after being betrayed by Akechi Mitsuhide. Their surprise deaths created a power vacuum and a succession crisis within the Oda clan. Nobunaga's second and third eldest sons, Oda Nobukatsu and Oda Nobutaka, respectively, began to quarrel over who would succeed him. Nobunaga's retainer and general Hashiba Hideyoshi (later known as Toyotomi Hideyoshi) summoned a council to Kiyosu Castle to settle the succession issue. However, the council declared that Nobutada's 3-year-old son Oda Hidenobu was the rightful heir. Hideyoshi, having defeated Akechi Mitsuhide at the Battle of Yamazaki and with Nobunaga's heir being an infant, was in a very strong position to unofficially succeed Nobunaga himself. Shibata Katsuie, one of Nobunaga's trusted generals, challenged Hideyoshi by changing his initial support for Hidenobu to supporting Nobutaka's claim to the lordship.

== Battle ==
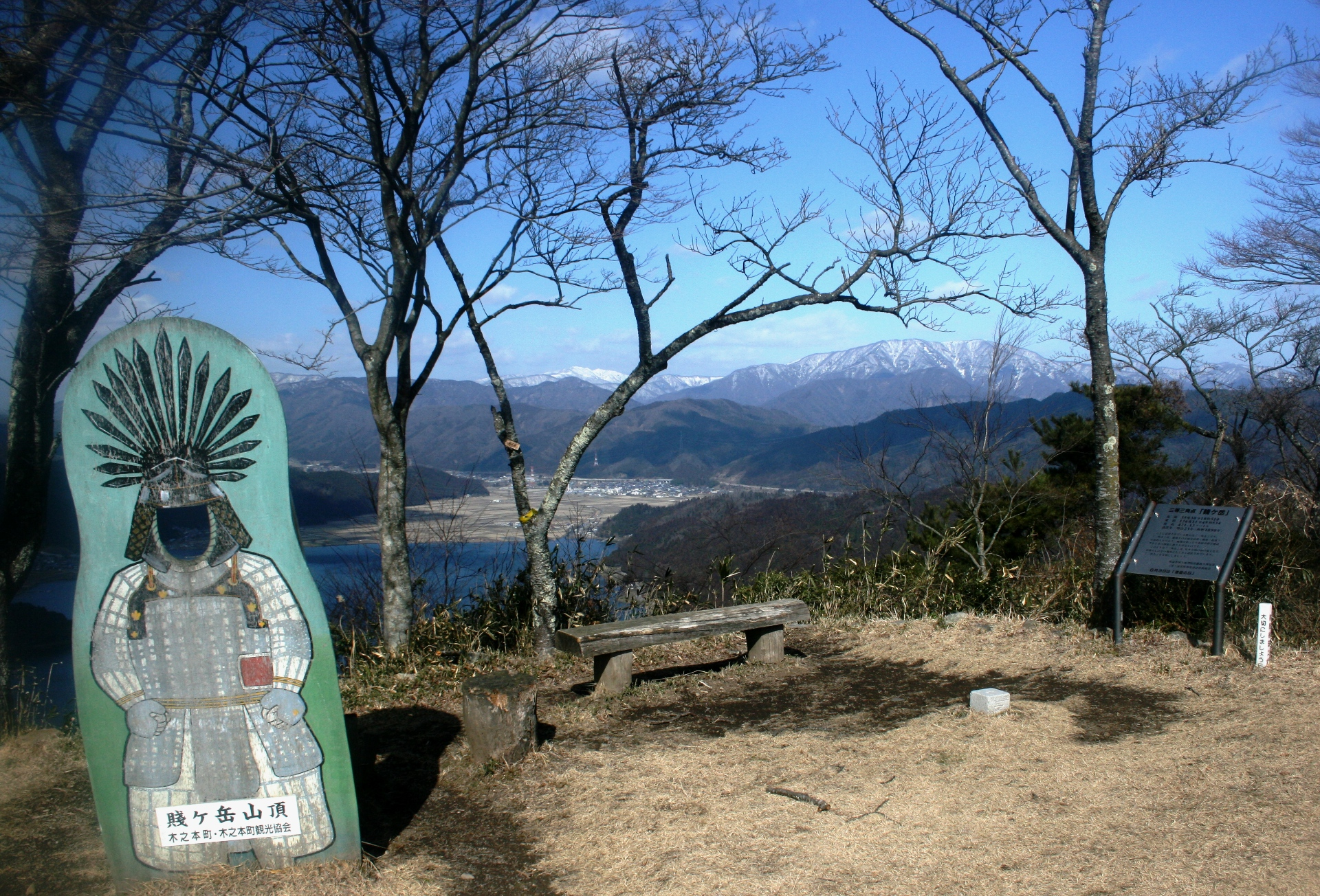
Top of Mount Shizu and Lake Yogo

In May 1583, Katsuie coordinated a number of simultaneous attacks on Shizugatake, a series of forts in northern Ōmi Province, located in present-day Nagahama, Shiga Prefecture. These forts, Iwasaki-yama, Tagami, and Shizugatake, were held by Hideyoshi's generals including Nakagawa Kiyohide and Takayama Ukon. Katsuie's nephew Sakuma Morimasa attacked these forts on his orders, taking Iwasaki-yama and killing Nakagawa, but Shizugatake's defenses held. On hearing that Hideyoshi had made camp at Ōgaki with a large mounted force of 20,000 men, Katsuie ordered Sakuma Morimasa to withdraw his troops to Ōiwa. Sakuma did not heed Katsuie's orders, calculating the castle would fall before Hideyoshi's army, assumed to be at least three days away, could arrive to relieve them. However, in the midst of this fighting, the army led by Maeda Toshiie on the Shibata side, deployed on Mt. Shige, abruptly left the front lines. Later, Hideyoshi led his men on a forced march through the night, covering nearly 50 miles in 6 hours, and linked up with the defenders of Tagami. Sakuma ordered his men to break the siege lines and prepare to defend themselves, but Hideyoshi's army pushed Sakuma's forces into a rout.

After the armies of Fuwa Naomitsu and Kanamori Nagachika on the Shibata side began to retreat as well, Hideyoshi pursued Sakuma and his forces back to Katsuie's fortress at Kitanosho Castle in Echizen Province, located within present-day Fukui. Hideyoshi's men seized the castle after three days, but not before Katsuie killed members of his household including his wife, Oda Nobunaga's sister Oichi, then setting the castle keep on fire and committing seppuku. Sakuma was captured by Hideyoshi's forces and beheaded.

== Aftermath ==
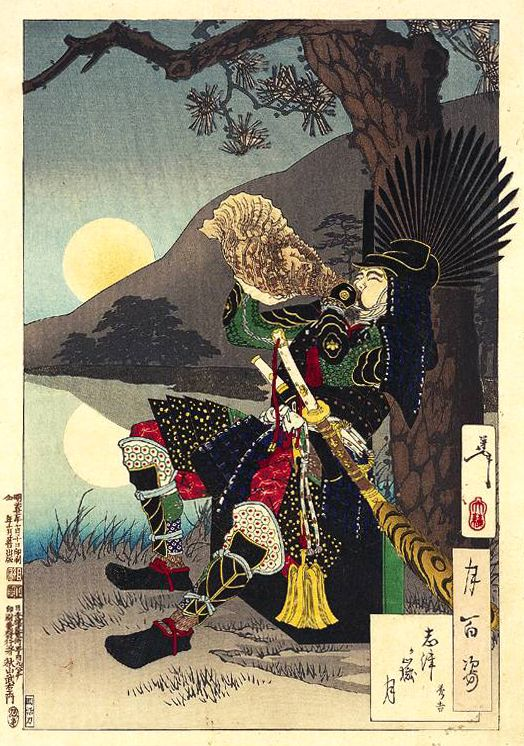
One Hundred Aspects of the Moon No. 67, by Yoshitoshi:The Moon and Hideyoshi at the Battle of Shizugatake.

As a result of the battle, Oichi's young daughters with Azai Nagamasa (Katsuie's step-daughters) were allowed to leave Kitanosho Castle unscathed and became Hideyoshi's adoptive daughters. In June 1583, Oda Nobutaka was soon pressured by both Hideyoshi and Nobukatsu into committing suicide, eliminating him from the competition. Nobutaka wrote a death poem cursing Hideyoshi and implying that he had been involved in his father Oda Nobunaga's death.

Hideyoshi had now consolidated his position and most of his influence over the Oda clan, but would continue to face competition from Nobukatsu, who had allied himself with Tokugawa Ieyasu, until the Battle of Komaki and Nagakute in 1584.

== Seven Spears of Shizugatake ==
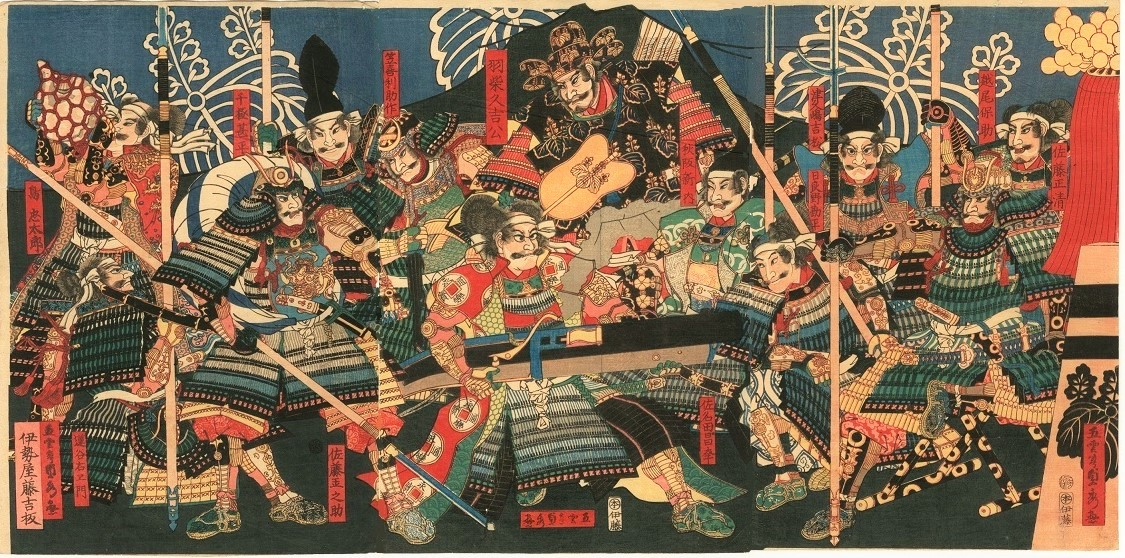
Seven Spears of Shizugatake

Hideyoshi's chief seven generals in the battle at Shizugatake earned a great degree of fame and honor, and came to be known as the shichi-hon yari or "Seven Spears of Shizugatake". Among these generals were men who would later become some of Hideyoshi's closest retainers, such as Katō Kiyomasa.

The Seven Spears of Shizugatake were the following Samurai:

- Wakizaka Yasuharu (1554–1626)
- Katagiri Katsumoto (1556–1615)
- Hirano Nagayasu (1559–1628)
- Fukushima Masanori (1561–1624)
- Kasuya Takenori (1562–1607)
- Katō Kiyomasa (1562–1611)
- Katō Yoshiaki (1563–1631)

== Notable warriors ==
- Menjō Katsuteru (? –1583), swordsman killed in the Battle of Shizugatake
- Ishida Mitsunari (1559–1600)

According to the "Hitotsuyanagi Kaki," Ishida Mitsunari was in charge of a mission to spy on Shibata Katsuie's army and also performed a great feat of Ichiban-yari, being the first to thrust a spear at an enemy soldier, as one of the warriors on the front line.

- Otani Yoshitsugu (1558–1600)

Yoshitsugu was said to have taken part within the Toyotomi ranks. One account states that Otani Yoshitsugu was the one who used his wits to convince Shibata Katsutoyo to surrender prior to the battle.
