= Sakuma Morimasa =

- 佐久間 盛政
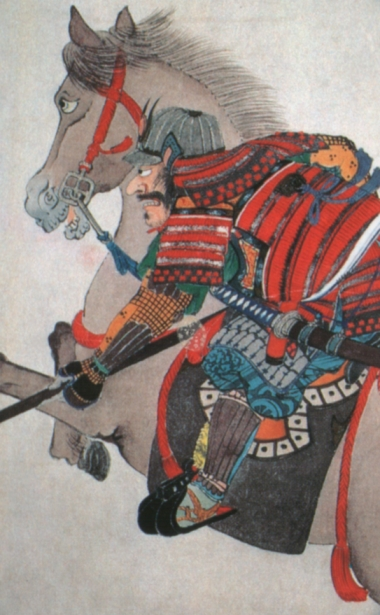
- Sakuma Morimasa (from Riding image of Sakuma Morimasa held by Kenkun Jinja, Kyoto)

Lord of Kanazawa Castle
- In office 1580–1583
- Succeeded by: Maeda Toshiie

Personal details
- Born: 1554; Shōwa-ku, Nagoya
- Died: July 1, 1583; Battle of Shizugatake
- Relations: Sakuma Moritsugu (father); Sakuma Nobumori (uncle); Shibata Katsuie (uncle)
- Nickname: "Demon Genba"

Military service
- Allegiance: Oda clan Owari-Shibata clan
- Commands: Kanazawa Castle
- Battles/wars: Battle of Kannonji (1568); Siege of Tezutsuyama Castle (1570); Battle of Yasugawara (1573); Battle of Makishima Castle (1573); Hokuriku Campaign (1580); Battle of Shizugatake (1583)

Sakuma Morimasa (佐久間 盛政, 1554 – July 1, 1583) was the son of Sakuma Moritsugu, cousin of Sakuma Nobumori, a prominent Oda retainer to Oda Nobuhide and Oda Nobunaga. After several campaigns in which he had fought, he was given the nickname oni-genba which literally means "Demon Genba", Genba being his middle name.

== Biography ==
Morimasa was born in what is now Shōwa-ku, Nagoya (situated in contemporary Aichi District, Owari Province), He was a retainer of Shibata Katsuie and one of his top generals in many of his campaigns.

Morimasa's first battle was the Battle of Kannonji Castle in 1568 against Rokkaku Yoshikata, he was 15 years old. Morimasa continued joining various battles, including the Siege of Tezutsuyama Castle in Echizen Province against Asakura clan in 1570, the Battle of Yasugawara against Rokkaku Yoshikata and the Battle of Makishima Castle against Ashikaga Yoshiaki in 1573, and performed distinguished war service.

Morimasa was given the former Ikko Sect fortress Oyama Gobo in the Kaga prefecture by Oda Nobunaga; the fortress was subsequently named Oyama Castle in 1580 but went on to become Kanazawa Castle.

In 1581, he beats Uesugi Kagekatsu from Shirayama Castle at Kaga Province. Later, Morimasa headed for a rescue in response to a demand by Maeda Toshiie and beat the Uesugi army stationed at the back of the Arayama Castle at Noto Province.

In 1582, after the betrayal of Akechi Mitsuhide which led to the death of both Oda Nobunaga and his heir Oda Nobutada, Morimasa sided with Shibata Katsuie over making Oda Nobutaka (the third son of Nobunaga) as heir to the Oda clan whereas Hashiba Hideyoshi (later Toyotomi Hideyoshi) supported Lord Sanboshi. Sanboshi was the heir to Oda Nobutada and was still an infant at that time. This argument led to the split of the Oda clan retainers into the two main factions led by Shibata Katsuie and Hashiba Hideyoshi. Armies of the two factions eventually came to war.

== Death ==
=== Battle of Shizugatake ===
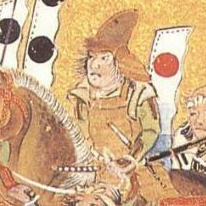
Sakuma Morimasa (from Shizugadake Kassen Zu Byōbu)

In 1583, Morimasa led an offensive force against Takayama Ukon in Iwasakiyama. Morimasa then proceeded against Shibata Katsuie's orders, killing Nakagawa Kiyohide in the early stages of the battle of Shizugatake. However, he ignored Shibata Katsuie's orders to fall back and this led to his defeat as Toyotomi Hideyoshi's forces approached the next morning. Morimasa was captured and beheaded.

The charge by Morimasa was the spark necessary for the battle of Shizugatake where Hideyoshi's troops were able to suppress any resistance led by Maeda Toshiie and prevented the support of Sassa Narimasa and Takigawa Kazumasu.

In all, Hideyoshi's troops swelled to 120,000 whereas Shibata Katsuie's troops had only reached 25,000. This eventually forced Shibata Katsuie to commit seppuku along with his wife Lady Oichi (younger sister of Nobunaga) following the betrayal of Maeda Toshiie.
