= Aoi (TV series) =

2000 taiga drama about the first three Tokugawa shōguns

- Written by: James Miki
- Directed by: Akihiko Shigemitsu; Mitsunobu Ozaki; Jō Satō; Kazutaka Watanabe
- Starring: Masahiko Tsugawa; Toshiyuki Nishida; Onoe Tatsunosuke II; Onoe Kikunosuke V Miki Sakai; Joe Shishido; Shigeru Kōyama; Kyōko Mitsubayashi; Kuriko Namino; Kei Suma; Ryō Tamura; Nanako Ōkōchi; Minori Terada; Teruhiko Saigō; Ryunosuke Kaneda; Nakamura Baijaku II; Keizō Kanie; Isao Natsuyagi; Ryūzō Hayashi; Kirin Kiki; Nenji Kobayashi; Ken Utsui; Mayumi Ogawa; Mitsuko Kusabue; Isuzu Yamada; Tōru Emori; Shima Iwashita
- Narrated by: Nakamura Baijaku II
- Opening theme: "Time of Destiny"
- Composer: Taro Iwashiro
- Country of origin: Japan
- Original language: Japanese
- No. of episodes: 49

Production
- Executive producer: Atsushi Kawai
- Running time: 45 minutes

Original release
- Network: NHK
- Release: January 9 – December 17, 2000

Aoi (Japanese: 葵 徳川三代, Hepburn: Aoi Tokugawa Sandai) is a 2000 Japanese historical drama television series and the 39th NHK taiga drama. The series respectively stars Masahiko Tsugawa, Toshiyuki Nishida, and Onoe Tatsunosuke II as the first three Tokugawa shōguns. It aired from January 9 to December 17, 2000, and ran for a total of 49 episodes.

Aoi is the first taiga drama to be fully filmed in high definition.

== Plot ==
The story begins with the battle of Sekigahara.

== Cast ==
=== Tokugawa Shoguns ===
- Masahiko Tsugawa as Tokugawa Ieyasu - the first shogun of the Tokugawa shogunate
- Toshiyuki Nishida as Tokugawa Hidetada - the second shogun
- Onoe Tatsunosuke II as Tokugawa Iemitsu - the third shogun
  - Takayuki Yamada as young Iemitsu

=== Tokugawa clan ===
- Shima Iwashita as Ogō - wife of Hidetada
- Isuzu Yamada as Odai no Kata - mother of Ieyasu
- Kyōko Mitsubayashi as Acha no Tsubone
- Minako Osanai as Oman no Kata
- Michiko Godai as Lady Chaa
- Kirin Kiki as Lady Kasuga
- Miki Sakai as Tokugawa Masako
- Yoko Moriguchi as Okaji no Kata
- Nanako Ōkōchi as Senhime
  - Marika Matsumoto as young Senhime
- Fujita Okamoto as Yūki Hideyasu
- Hiroyuki Sakamoto as Matsudaira Tadateru
- Lie Katō as Irohahime
- Hayato Ōshiba as Tokugawa Yorifusa
- Manabu Hamada as Hoshina Masayuki
- Asumi Nakada as Haruhime
- Yukie Nakama as Oraku
- Gen Hongō as Tokugawa Yorinobu
- Yūtarō Yamamoto as Nagatomimaru
- Hideyuki Akabane as Tokugawa Yoshinao
  - Ryūnosuke Kamiki as Gorōtamaru (young Yoshinao)
- Tomoyo Kurosawa as Ichihime

=== Fudai daimyo ===
- Shigeru Kōyama as Honda Masanobu
- Ikkei Watanabe as Honda Masazumi - the eldest son of Masanobu
- Joe Shishido as Honda Tadakatsu - one of the Shitennō
- Hiroshi Katsuno as Ii Naomasa - one of the Shitennō
- Kōji Shimizu as Sakakibara Yasumasa - one of the Shitennō
- Taro Ishida as Ōkubo Tadachika
- Takashi Sasano as Torii Mototada
- Ryūzō Hayashi as Doi Toshikatsu
- Mizuho Suzuki as Itakura Katsushige
- Masaki Terasoma as Itakura Shigemasa
- Hiroshi Iwasaki as Sakai Tadayo
- Katsumi Chō as Naitō Kiyonari
- Saburo Ishikura as Aoyama Tadatoshi

=== Toyotomi ===
- Onoe Kikunosuke V as Toyotomi Hideyori
- Mayumi Ogawa as Yodo-dono - the second wife of Hideyoshi
  - Mei Kurokawa as Cha-cha (young Yodo, flashback)
- Mitsuko Kusabue as Kōdai-in - the first wife of Hideyoshi
- Mayuko Fukuda as Yuihime - the daughter of Hideyori
- Nenji Kobayashi as Katagiri Katsumoto
- Naoki Hosaka as Ōno Harunaga
- Shingo Hiramatsu as Oda Uraku
- Teruhiko Saigō as Sanada Yukimura
- Hiroshi Hatanaka as Kimura Shigenari
- Takayuki Sugō as Konishi Yukinaga
- Yoshisada Sakaguchi as Nakamura Kazu'uji

=== Council of Five Elders ===
- Kazuo Kitamura as Maeda Toshiie
- Ken Utsui as Mōri Terumoto
- Teruyuki Kagawa as Ukita Hideie
- Tsunehiko Kamijō as Uesugi Kagekatsu

=== Go-Bugyō ===
- Tōru Emori as Ishida Mitsunari
- Shinichiro Mikami as Asano Nagamasa
- Kei Satō as Mashita Nagamori
- Toshio Kurosawa as Natsuka Masaie
- Hiroshi Kamiyama as Maeda Gen'i

=== Ishida family ===
- Masane Tsukayama as Ishida Masazumi
- Taketoshi Naito as Ishida Masatsugu
- Keiko Takahashi as Orin - wife of Mitsunari
- Isao Natsuyagi as Shima Sakon

=== Eastern Army ===
- Ryō Tamura as Tōdō Takatora
- Shinji Yamashita as Kuroda Nagamasa
- Shunsuke Kariya as Katō Kiyomasa
- Keizō Kanie as Fukushima Masanori
- Satoru Saitō as Yamauchi Kazutoyo
- Kei Suma as Date Masamune
- Hatsunori Hasegawa as Maeda Toshinaga
- Tsutomu Isobe as Ikeda Terumasa
- Hideaki Tezuka as Tsuda Shigemoto
- Hiroyuki Watanabe as Asano Yoshinaga
- Shirō Saitō as Tanaka Yoshimasa
- Taishi Horikoshi as Sanada Nobuyuki
- Naoki Takemura as Miyamoto Musashi

=== Western Army ===
- Toshiyuki Hosokawa as Ōtani Yoshitsugu
- Akaji Maro as Shimazu Yoshihiro
- Yūichirō Yamaguchi as Shimazu Toyohisa
- Kazuma Suzuki as Kobayakawa Hideaki
- Ichirō Zaitsu as Ankokuji Ekei
- Osami Nabe as Kikkawa Hiroie
- Shinya Ōwada as Tachibana Muneshige

=== Kyōgoku ===
- Akira Onodera as Kyōgoku Takatsugu
- Kuriko Namino as Jōkō-in

=== Hosokawa ===
- Isao Sasaki as Hosokawa Tadaoki
- Kyōka Suzuki as Hosokawa Gracia
- Shun Oguri as Hosokawa Tadatoshi

=== Imperial House ===
- Hiroyuki Kinoshita as Emperor Go-Yōzei
- Yasumasa Ōba as Emperor Go-Mizunoo
- Minori Terada as Nijō Akizane
- Junpei Morita as Sanjōnishi Sane'eda
- Noriko Ogawa as Sadako
  - Aki Maeda as young Sadako
- Norihiro Inoue as Kajūji Mitsutoyo
- Kazutoyo Yoshimi as Karasumaru Mitsuhiro

=== Others ===
- Nakamura Baijaku II as Tokugawa Mitsukuni, a.k.a. Mito Kōmon
- Kazuyo Asari as Sassa Sukesaburō, a.k.a. Suke-san
- Machiko Washio as Asaka Tanpaku, a.k.a. Kaku-san
- Terence O'Brien as William Adams, a.k.a. Miura Anjin
- Tim Knowles as Richard Cocks
- Yatsuko Tan'ami as Kenshō-in, Takeda Shingen's daughter
- Natsuko Migiwa as Maeda Matsu
- Mikio Shimizu as Oda Nobukatsu
- Noriko Shōji as a reporter (herself)
- San'yūtei Rakutarō
- Ryunosuke Kaneda as Tenkai
- Hiroshi Ōkōchi as Konchiin Sūden

== Staff ==
- Music : Taro Iwashiro
- Historical research : Shinzaburō Ōishi
- Architectural research : Kiyoshi Hirai
- Clothing research : Kiyoko Koizumi
- Sword fight arranger : Kunishirō Hayashi

== TV schedule ==
Episode	Title	Directed by	Original airdate	Rating
1	"Sōkatsu Sekigahara" (総括関ヶ原, The Battle of Sekigahara)	Akihiko Shigemitsu	January 9, 2000	22.6%
2	"Hideyoshi no Yuigon" (秀吉の遺言, The Taiko's Last Will)	Akihiko Shigemitsu	January 16, 2000	22.6%
3	"Gotairō Gobugyō" (五大老五奉行, Five Great Elders, Five Commissioners)	Akihiko Shigemitsu	January 23, 2000	21.5%
4	"Gōwan 58 sai" (豪腕五十八歳, The Titan at 58)	Akihiko Shigemitsu	January 30, 2000	21.7%
5	"Han-Shuryū" (反主流, Against the Mainstream)	Mitsunobu Ozaki	February 6, 2000	21.0%
6	"Takokuseki gun" (多国籍軍, Loyalties)	Mitsunobu Ozaki	February 13, 2000	20.0%
7	"Dangai jō" (弾劾状, Writ of Censure)	Mitsunobu Ozaki	February 20, 2000	18.1%
8	"Tasūha kōsaku" (多数派工作, Strength in Numbers)	Mitsunobu Ozaki	February 27, 2000	18.7%
9	"Fūun Ōgaki-jō" (風雲大垣城, Ōgaki Castle)	Mitsunobu Ozaki	March 5, 2000	17.9%
10	"Zenshōsen" (前哨戦, Opening Skirmish)	Akihiko Shigemitsu	March 12, 2000	20.0%
11	"Tenka Wakeme" (天下分け目, The Battle Begins)	Akihiko Shigemitsu	March 19, 2000	19.9%
12	"Kassen Sekigahara" (合戦関ヶ原, Sekigahara Bloodbath)	Akihiko Shigemitsu	March 26, 2000	18.1%
13	"Mitsunari Saigo" (三成最期, Mitsunari's End)	Akihiko Shigemitsu	April 2, 2000	16.0%
14	"Yodo no Menmoku" (淀の面目, Yodo Loses Face)	Mitsunobu Ozaki	April 9, 2000	17.3%
15	"Hanayome wa Sansai" (花嫁は三歳, The Three Year Old Bride)	Mitsunobu Ozaki	April 16, 2000	16.1%
16	"Hidetada no Himitsu" (秀忠の秘密, Hidetada's Secret)	Mitsunobu Ozaki	April 23, 2000	17.1%
17	"Senhime Konrei" (千姫婚礼, Princess Sen Weds)	Mitsunobu Ozaki	April 30, 2000	17.1%
18	"Ibo Kyōdai" (異母兄弟, Half Brothers)	Akihiko Shigemitsu	May 7, 2000	16.7%
19	"Shogun Hidetada" (将軍秀忠)	Akihiko Shigemitsu	May 14, 2000	17.2%
20	"Nigen Seiji" (二元政治, Dual Rule)	Akihiko Shigemitsu	May 21, 2000	17.7%
21	"Idainaru Chichi" (偉大なる父, Peerless Father)	Mitsunobu Ozaki	May 28, 2000	17.6%
22	"Ōgosho" (大御所)	Mitsunobu Ozaki	June 4, 2000	17.6%
23	"Kyūchū Jūdaijiken" (宮中重大事件, Scandal in the Court)	Mitsunobu Ozaki	June 11, 2000	18.1%
24	"Yabō no Rinkaku" (野望の輪郭, Outline of Ambition)	Akihiko Shigemitsu	June 18, 2000	15.8%
25	"Hideyori Jōraku" (秀頼上洛, Hideyori Goes to Kyoto)	Akihiko Shigemitsu	June 25, 2000	14.5%
26	"Habatsu Kōsō" (派閥抗争, Factional Rivalry)	Akihiko Shigemitsu	July 2, 2000	17.7%
27	"Hifun no Kaisen" (悲憤の開戦, Commencement of Hostilities)	Akihiko Shigemitsu	July 9, 2000	16.4%
28	"Osaka Fuyu no Jin" (大坂冬の陣, Osaka Winter Campaign)	Mitsunobu Ozaki	July 16, 2000	17.2%
29	"Osaka Natsu no Jin" (大坂夏の陣, Osaka Summer Campaign)	Mitsunobu Ozaki	July 23, 2000	17.0%
30	"Osaka-jō Enjō" (大坂城炎上, Osaka Castle Burns)	Mitsunobu Ozaki	July 30, 2000	19.3%
31	"Tadateru Kandō" (忠輝勘当, Tadateru is Disowned)	Akihiko Shigemitsu	August 6, 2000	17.4%
32	"Ieyasu no Shi" (家康の死, Ieyasu's Death)	Akihiko Shigemitsu	August 13, 2000	17.8%
33	"Tōshō Daigongen" (東照大権現)	Akihiko Shigemitsu	August 20, 2000	18.4%
34	"Gorakuin" (御落胤, Hidden Child)	Jō Satō	August 27, 2000	17.4%
35	"Takechiyo no Kussetsu" (竹千代の屈折, Takechiyo's Lesson)	Jō Satō	September 3, 2000	18.9%
36	"Kazuhime Judai" (和姫入内, Princess Kazu Enters the Court)	Mitsunobu Ozaki	September 10, 2000	19.2%
37	"Tadanao no Ranshin" (忠直の乱心, Tadanao Goes Mad)	Mitsunobu Ozaki	September 17, 2000	20.8%
38	"Utsunomiya Tsuri-tenjō" (宇都宮釣天井, Utsunomiya Trap Ceiling)	Akihiko Shigemitsu	October 1, 2000	19.4%
39	"Shogun Iemitsu" (将軍家光)	Akihiko Shigemitsu	October 8, 2000	17.2%
40	"Oyagokoro" (親ごころ, A Father's Love)	Kazutaka Watanabe	October 15, 2000	19.1%
41	"Gotaimen" (御対面, The Meeting)	Kazutaka Watanabe	October 22, 2000	15.1%
42	"Nijō-jō Gyōkō" (二条城行幸, Imperial Visit)	Akihiko Shigemitsu	October 29, 2000	19.3%
43	"Onna no Isshō" (女の一生, A Woman's Lifetime)	Akihiko Shigemitsu	November 5, 2000	17.2%
44	"Ōji Kōtan" (皇子降誕, A Prince is Born)	Akihiko Shigemitsu	November 12, 2000	18.9%
45	"Kasuga no Tsubone" (春日局)	Jō Satō	November 19, 2000	20.2%
46	"Jotei Sokui" (女帝即位, Enthronement)	Mitsunobu Ozaki	November 26, 2000	18.8%
47	"San kyodai" (三兄弟, Three Brothers)	Mitsunobu Ozaki	December 3, 2000	19.0%
48	"Saraba Hidetada" (さらば秀忠, Farewell Hidetada)	Akihiko Shigemitsu	December 10, 2000	17.3%
49	"Meikun Zukuri" (名君づくり, The Making of a Wise Ruler)	Akihiko Shigemitsu	December 17, 2000	20.3%
Average rating 18.5% - Rating is based on Japanese Video Research (Kantō region).
