= Natsuka =

Natsuka (written: 名塚 or 長束), also read as Nazuka, is a Japanese surname. Notable people with the surname include:

- Kaori Nazuka (名塚 佳織, born 1985), Japanese freelance voice actress and singer
- Natsuka Masaie (長束 正家, 1562–1600), Japanese daimyō
- Yoshihiro Natsuka (名塚 善寛, born 1969), Japanese footballer and manager
