= Council of Five Elders =

1598–1600 government in feudal Japan

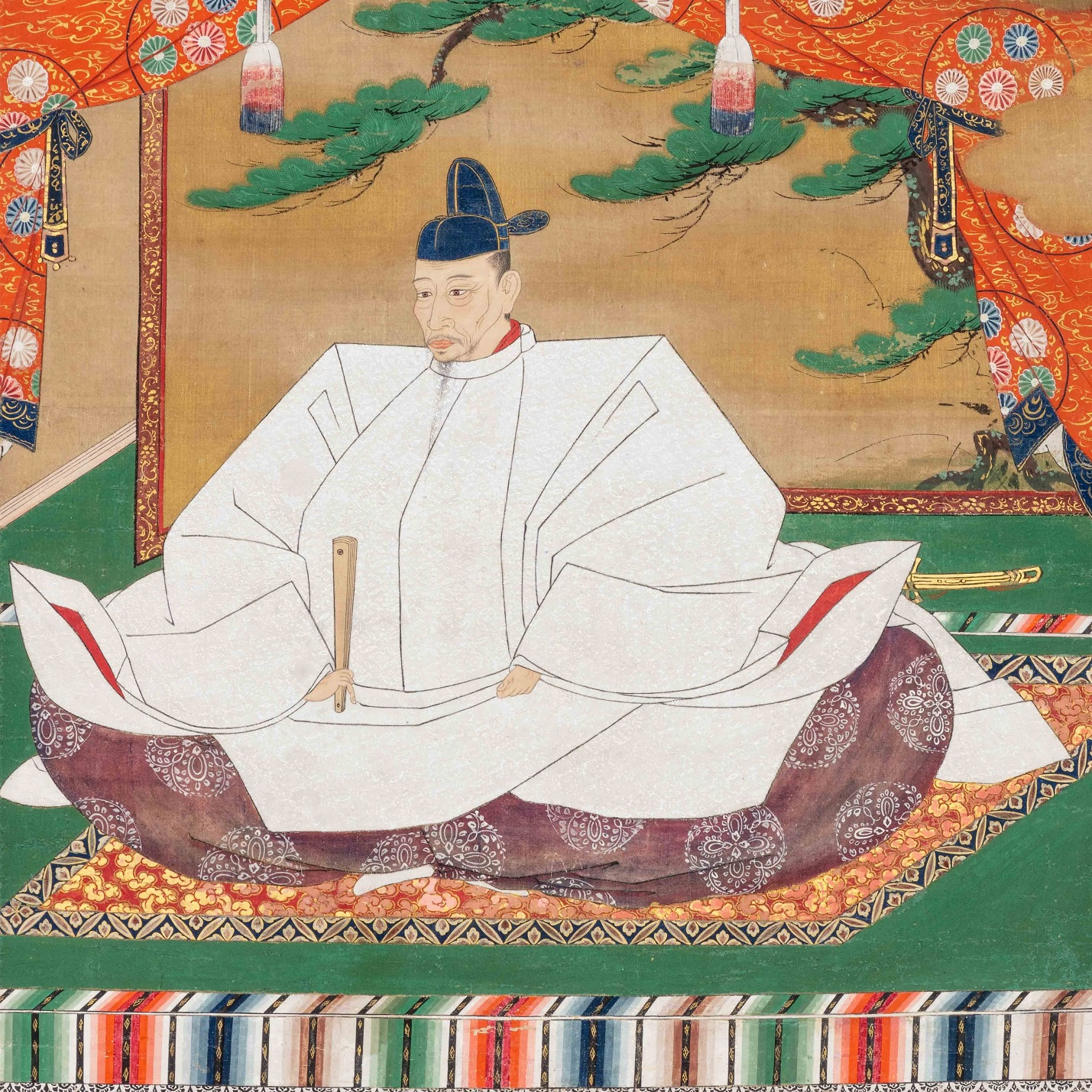
Toyotomi Hideyoshi

In the history of Japan, the Council of Five Elders (Japanese: 五大老, Hepburn: Go-Tairō) was a group of five powerful feudal lords (大名, daimyō) formed in 1598 by the Regent (太閤, Taikō) Toyotomi Hideyoshi, shortly before his death the same year. While Hideyoshi was on his deathbed, his son, Toyotomi Hideyori, was still only five years old and as such Hideyoshi needed to create the council in order to ensure his heir would be able to succeed him after coming of age. They also acted as advisers for the Five Commissioners (五奉行, Go-Bugyō), which had also been established by Hideyoshi to govern Kyoto and the surrounding areas.

== Creation of the Council ==
=== Leading up to the creation of the council ===
Hideyoshi's demeanor slowly changed as the invasions of Korea (attempts to conquer both Korea and China) were failing. Hideyoshi himself had not joined the Korean Campaigns and assigned vassals in his command to head the campaign. He sent his final force of 140,000 to Korea in 1597, but the efforts were fruitless.

Hideyoshi's execution of family members was another reason for questioning his sanity during this period. Before the birth of his son Hideyori, he had adopted his nephew, Toyotomi Hidetsugu, to be his heir in 1591 because Hidetsugu had helped Hideyoshi in his campaigns. Once Hideyori was born, he ordered Toyotomi Hidetsugu to commit ritual suicide on Mount Kōya, this causing Hideyoshi's only possible heir to be his infant son Hideyori. The people closest to Hidetsugu, such as his family and retainers, were also put to death.

In 1595 Toyotomi Hideyoshi officially announced five laws and ordinances (Gokajo No Goseimon) to maintain the stability of the regime and overcome the upheaval of politics after the removal of Hidetsugu.

On the "fifteenth day of the seventh month", the senior daimyō under order gathered at Maeda Toshiie's residence in Fushimi to renew their pledge of loyalty to Hideyori. On the "fifth day of the eighth month", 13 days before his death (on the 18th day of the 8th month of the third year of the Keichō era), Hideyoshi issued an order to the Elders requiring that children of various generals go to Osaka Castle, once Hideyori had moved there.

Hideyoshi's health declined after he fell ill in the later half of 1598. Realizing he would need to find a way to ensure the installation of his son as heir following his death, he called out to certain trusted daimyō to grant his final request:

Until Hideyori reaches adulthood, I am asking for the help of the people whose names are listed in this document. This is the only request I want to make.

Fifth day, Eighth month

To: Ieyasu

Chikuzen

Terumoto

Kagekatsu

Hideie

— Toyotomi Hideyoshi, 101 Letters of Hideyoshi (Boscaro 1975, p. 77)

There are also accounts that when Hideyoshi called upon Ieyasu to become a regent, he asked him to decide if Hideyori is fit to rule when he reaches a ripe age and that Ieyasu rejected this request.

=== Choosing the council ===
The members of the council were all daimyō chosen due to their relation to the taikō and the amount of power they held in the country. Hideyoshi chose powerful daimyō to prevent authority being concentrated on a single daimyō. Maeda Toshiie and Ukita Hideie were chosen due to their closeness with Hideyoshi as Maeda Toshiie was Hideyoshi's friend who had also served Oda Nobunaga. Maeda Toshiie was also chosen due to the respect he had from the Toyotomi family and Hideyoshi wanted to prevent Ieyasu from holding absolute power among the Five Elders. Ukita Hideie had been adopted under the name of Yuushi (猶子) by Hideyoshi and his closeness with Hideyoshi also led him to be appointed as a member of the five elders. These daimyō had also all served under Hideyoshi for many years in his house administration.

Even before the creation of the council, Hideyoshi treated the five differently from other daimyō. One reason for this was the absence of a Toritsugi (取次). Toritsugi acted as mediators that went between the daimyō to help with the communication of orders. This allowed each daimyō to talk directly to Hideyoshi, and it also meant that Hideyoshi would not intervene in the business of the daimyō in ruling their own domain. For the Shimazu clan, Ishida Mitsunari was appointed as the toritsugi, which also meant that Mitsunari and/or Toyotomi had power to intervene in Shimazu's domain. Hideyoshi expected the daimyō under his control to govern their lands and serve military services.

The larger the domains of the daimyō were, the more experienced those daimyō were at governing their lands. As such, Hideyoshi treated them differently than smaller daimyō, who needed Hideyoshi to intervene in local governance. In the 1588 Sword Hunt Policy, it is assumed that Hideyoshi only ordered smaller class daimyō to enforce the policy. The larger daimyō followed even without orders, but Hideyoshi did not strictly expect them to enforce the policy. Initially the sword hunt was intended to confiscate weapons to restrict formation of military forces, ensuring that no one could take the country by force. Hideyoshi could rely on the large daimyō, who were experienced and equipped with large military forces, to suppress local powers if they rebelled. In this way, Hideyoshi's treatment of the larger daimyō, Tokugawa, Maeda, Mori, and Uesugi, was exceptional.

=== Subgroups related to the council ===
Hideyoshi also appointed the Five Commissioners who were tasked to oversee the "basic business of the realm"; while the Elders were tasked to make sure that Hideyori would succeed Hideyoshi. During this time the Five Commissioners were Asano Nagamasa, Mashita Nagamori, Ishida Mitsunari, Natsuka Masaie and Maeda Gen'i.

The Elders had assistants known as chūro (中老) who acted as mediators, the Five Elders and the Five Commissioners. The chūro at this time were Nakamura Kazu-uji of Suruga, Ikoma Chikamasa of Takamatsu, and Horio Yoshiharu of Tottori.

=== Oath of Allegiance ===
On the "fifth day of the eighth month", 1598, the Commissioners and the Regents signed the following articles:

1. That they should serve Hideyori with the same single-minded loyalty they had shown to Hideyoshi.
2. The rules of Hideyoshi's house would not be altered. When the Five Commissioners were unable to determine a course of action for administration of public affairs, they were to consult their master (Hideyori) through Ieyasu and Toshiie; or if taking action, they were to consult the Emperor.
3. There were to be no factions among them. Personal considerations and partiality of every kind were to be excluded from their counsel.
4. The Five Commissioners, or overseers, were to strive to work together in the administration of public affairs, suppressing all petty jealousies and differences.
5. In settling matters the opinion of the majority was usually to be followed. But at the same time if the opinion of the minority showed no signs of being dictated by any personal interests, it should be duly considered. If only a few of the overseers were present when a question was settled, the absentees had no right to object unless it was quite evident that the private interests of the Commissioners present at the meeting prejudiced their minds in a wrong direction. In that case another meeting might be called.
6. It goes without saying that all accounts had to be kept in a manner that was above suspicion. There were to be no irregularities and no pressing of personal interests.
7. Whatever Hideyoshi desired to be kept secret, whether it were connected with his private life or with the Government, would not be allowed to leak.
8. If any of the Commissioners or their followers found that unconsciously they had acted contrary to the orders given to them, they would immediately report this to their superior officers, who would then deal leniently with them.

Hideyoshi used a talisman (護符 Gofu) called Kumano-goufu (熊野牛王府) from Kumano Shrine when making an oath with daimyō, and it is said that when Hideyoshi's death was near, he made the five elders to write vows to remain faithful to him after his death. This vow is known in Japanese as Kishomon (起證文).

=== Origin of the name "Go-Tairō" ===
After the death of Hideyoshi, the five commissioners, including Ishida Mitsunari referred to Ieyasu and the other elders as Go-bugyoshu (御奉行衆) and referred to the five commissioners as Toshiyoridomo (年寄共) on Kishomon. He purposely used the term Go-bugyoshu to remind the elders that their job was to support Hideyori with their lives. On the other hand, Shimazu Yoshihisa referred to the five elders as Go-rojushu (御老中衆) and Kato Kiyomasa called them the Nihon-Gotoshiyorishu (日本御年寄衆). They both called the five commissioners Go-bugyoshu (御奉行衆). People were calling them differently depending on their relationship with the five elders and the five commissioners, but there is no document that gives evidence that the Five Elders were actually called as Go-Tairo. The word Tairo (大老) was the name of the highest position that was temporarily a higher position than Roju (老中), under the Tokugawa Shogunate. It is believed that the Five Elders were referred to as the Go-Tairo after the title of Tairo was created in the Edo Period.

== The Five Elders ==
=== Tokugawa Ieyasu ===
Tokugawa Ieyasu controlled eight provinces in the Kantō region surrounding Edo (present-day Tokyo), and among the Five Elders, held the most power measured in koku. He was also entrusted by Hideyoshi with the order of Soufujirei (惣無事令) to take control of Kanto and Okuryogoku (Mutsu Province and Dewa Province) in 1587. After the Hidetsugu Incident (秀次事件) in 1597, Ieyasu was appointed to act as Regent temporarily until Hideyori reached 15 years of age and requested him to reside in Fushimi. Before the establishment of the council, Hideyoshi awarded the province of the Hojo to Ieyasu after the successful Odawara campaigns in the Kanto region. This action demonstrated the power that Hideyoshi had over Ieyasu.

After the collapse of the Council, Ieyasu became the founder and first shōgun of the Tokugawa shogunate, which effectively ruled Japan from the Battle of Sekigahara in 1600 until the Meiji Restoration in 1868.

=== Ukita Hideie ===
Ukita Hideie was the daimyō of Bizen and Mimasaka Provinces (modern Okayama Prefecture). He was a military commander and feudal lord during the Azuchi-Momoyama period. Also referred to as Hachirō (八郎). At the age of 26, Ukita was elected to be one of the five elders when he returned from the Imjin War, also known as the Japanese invasions of Korea. While he was an elder, he was also serving as a daimyō during the Warring States period. He was banished to Hachijō Island after the Battle of Sekigahara.

=== Maeda Toshiie ===
Maeda Toshiie was one of the leading generals of Oda Nobunaga following the Sengoku period of the 16th century extending to the Azuchi–Momoyama period. Referred to as Chikuzen in the letters by Hideyoshi. He became one of the Five Elders at the age of 53. Hideyoshi entrusted the province of Kaga and Etchū to Toshiie after taking the province from the daimyō Sassa Narimasa. While he was an elder, he also had a position as senior second rank (権大納言 Gon-Dainagon) and had the authority to pass his opinions on to the national government. After the death of Maeda Toshiie, his son, Maeda Toshinaga was to succeed him as a member of the Five Elders.

=== Uesugi Kagekatsu ===
Uesugi Kagekatsu was a Japanese samurai and daimyō during the Sengoku and Edo periods. He was the primary lord of the feudal domain of Yonesawa. He was elected to be a part of the Five Elders at the age of 43. Since the Battle of Shizugatake in 1583, he had cooperated with Hideyoshi by aiding him during battles, and he was one of the earliest daimyō to render homage to Hideyoshi. Hideyoshi had made alliances with Kagekatsu because he had the potential power to attack Ieyasu from the Echigo province in the north.

=== Mōri Terumoto ===
Mōri Terumoto was a Japanese daimyō during the Azuchi-Momoyama period and the Edo period. He was a descendant of the feudal lord of the Choshu domain. He became one of the Five Elders at the age of 46. Terumoto fought against Hideyoshi before the latter's rise to power, but lacked enough supporters. Realizing that Hideyoshi would be the next leader of the country, he began to build trust by sending gifts to celebrate Hideyoshi's victory at the Battle of Shizugatake and helping him in the Kyushu Campaign in 1587.

He was allied with Ishida Mitsunari at the Battle of Sekigahara and acted as the head general of the Western Army.

=== Kobayakawa Takakage ===
Kobayakawa Takakage was a samurai and daimyō (feudal lord) during the Sengoku period and Azuchi–Momoyama period. At first he fought against Hideyoshi as he was the one holding the power in the Mōri family, but after the Battle of Shizugatake, he decided to submit to Hideyoshi. Under Hideyoshi's rule, he was assigned to be in charge of Chikuzen province, which is modern day Fukuoka. Takakage handed over rule of the family to Hidetoshi (Hideaki) and retired, moved to Mihara. Takakage refurbished Najima Castle and made it his own residence. Kobayakawa died on June 12, 1597, at the age of 65. Due to the death of Kobayakawa in 1597, he is often excluded from the list of the Five Elders or referred as the 6th Elder. After his death, Uesugi Kagekatsu took his place on the council of Five Elders.

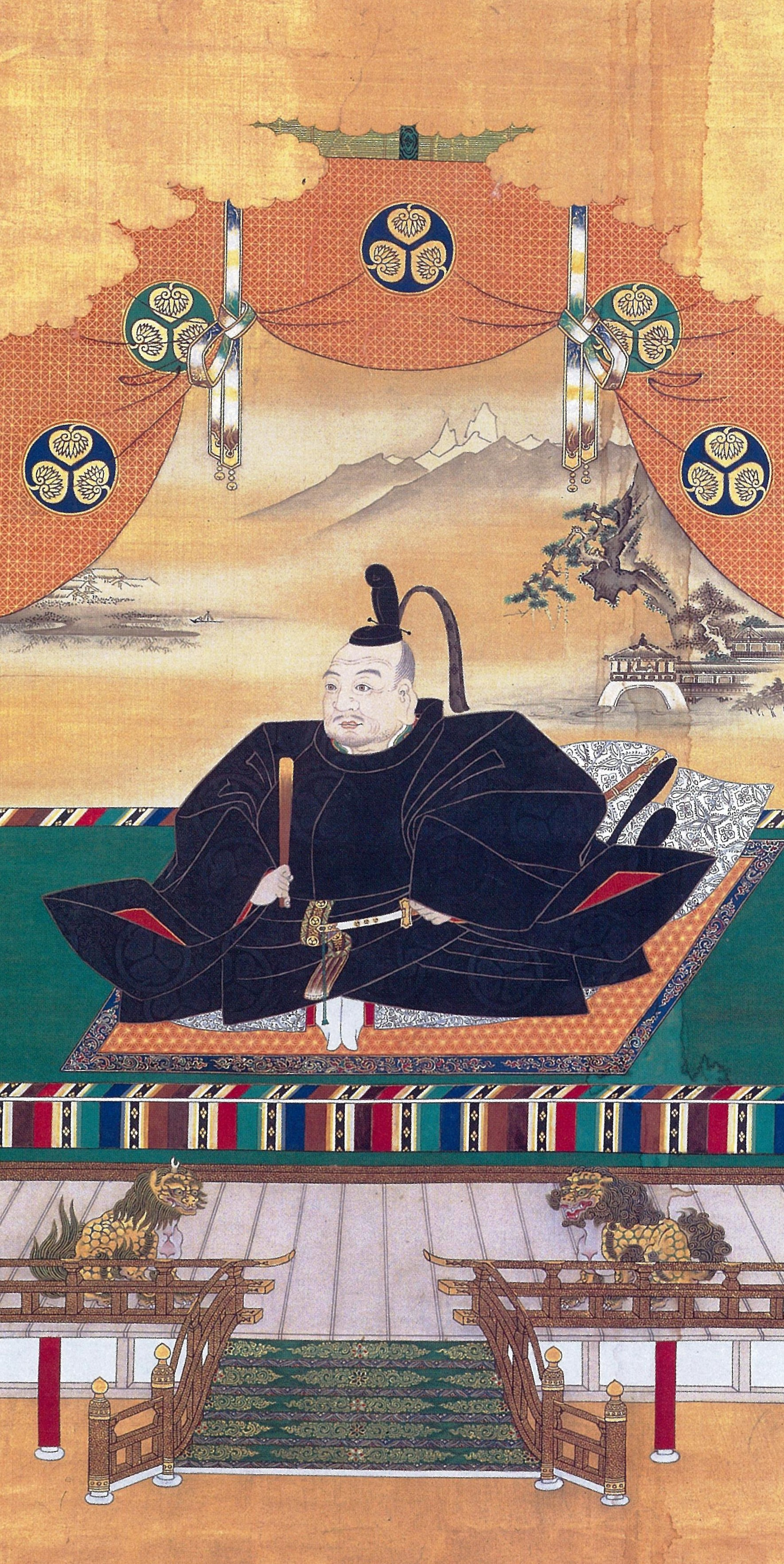
Tokugawa Ieyasu

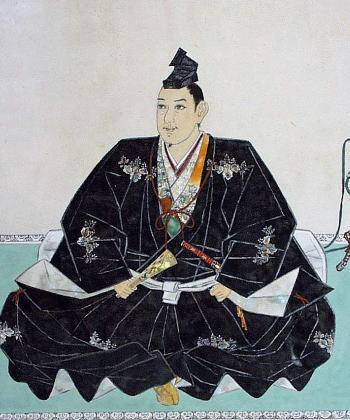
Ukita Hideie

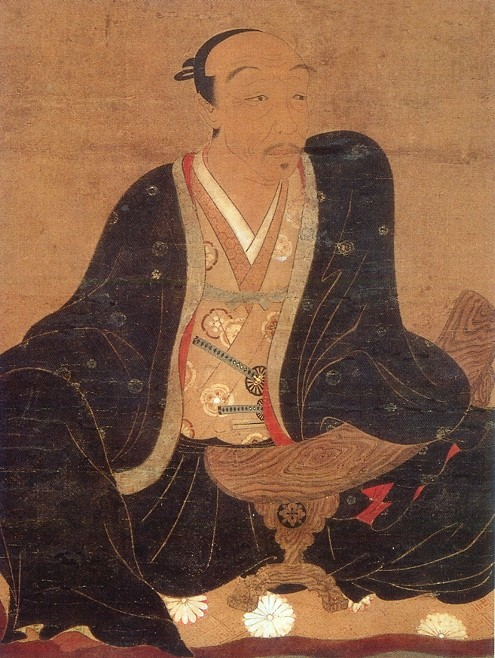
Maeda Toshiie

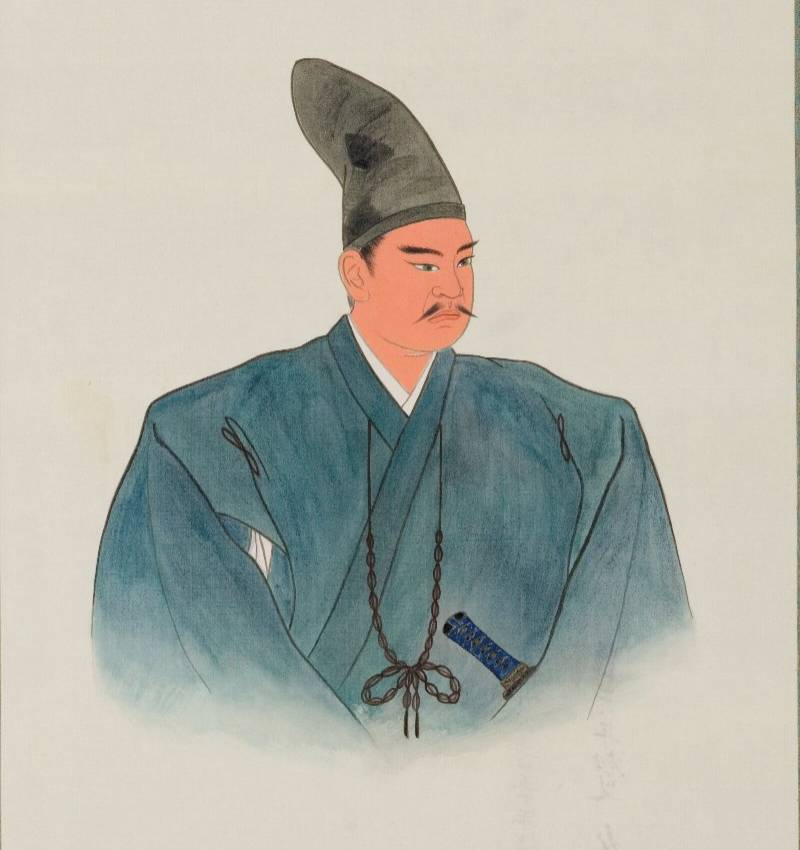
Uesugi Kagekatsu

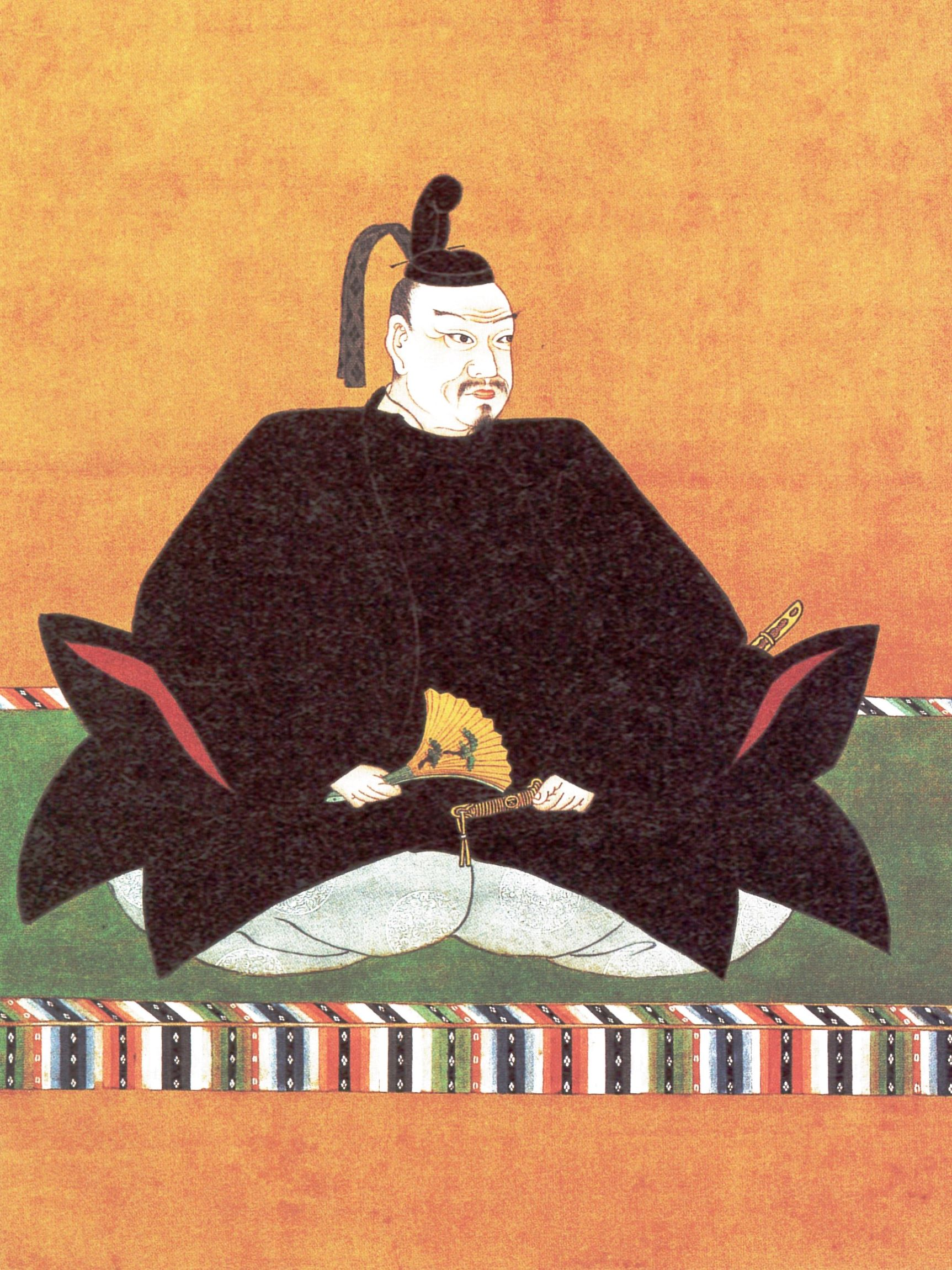
Mōri Terumoto

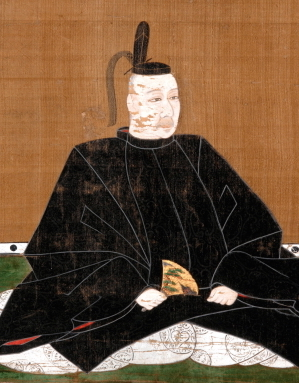
Kobayakawa Takakage

== Roles of the Council Members ==
=== Raising Hideyoshi's heir ===
Hideyoshi had given ownership of Osaka castle to his son Hideyori in 1594, Hideyori was just one year old at the time. Maeda Toshiie was given the order to raise Hideyori in Osaka Castle until he came of age to take his place as Hideyoshi's successor. Tokugawa Ieyasu was also charged with the role of guardian of Hideyori, as well as to see to Hideyori being appointed to the role of Regent. Ukita Hideie was to be counted on as a loyal member of Hideyori's service.

=== Attending to political business ===
Ieyasu was appointed by Hideyoshi to act as regent until Hideyori reached maturity and could take his place as leader. Uesugi Kagekatsu and Mōri Terumoto were to be informed and consulted on all political matters as advisers. The Elders were to deal with the administering of punishment to any person who broke the law. All monetary transactions were to be supervised by the Elders, and the elders were tasked with to setting up an account for Hideyori when he came of age.

=== Withdrawal from Korea ===
After Hideyoshi's death the Council of Five Elders issued an order for the Japanese army at the Korean Peninsula to return. The Council feared disorder among Hideyoshi's troops in Korea if they were to be told of his death and so, his death was not told to the armies in order to preserve their morale. After the withdrawal of Japanese armies which followed a military stalemate, the final peace negotiations to mark the end of war continued for several years.

=== Other roles ===
Ieyasu and Toshiie were to clear up any difficulties in administration encountered by the Five Commissioners, further acting as advisers or mediators in administration matters. The sons of both Tokugawa Ieyasu and Maeda Toshiie (Tokugawa Hidetada and Maeda Toshinaga respectively) were to assist their fathers with work related to the Five Elders, with plan of the latter being appointed as an Elder in the future.

Changes to Oath of Allegiance document

Tokugawa Ieyasu made some changes to Article 2 of the Oath of Allegiance document that no rules shall be amended, and that decisions were to be made by the majority in all cases.

On the Article 6 of the Allegiance Document Ieyasu added the following statements: "No questions concerning landed estate will be dealt with during the minority of Hideyori. No petitions made to him will be sent in; neither will Ieyasu himself ask for any changes to be made in the matter of land-ownership nor will he accept any gifts of land from Hideyori during his minority."

Maeda Toshiie added the following words "When Hideyori shall have reached his majority, certain representations shall be made to him by the Five Commissioners and by Ieyasu in reference to the bestowal of land on those whose services deserve reward and in reference to the confiscation of land in the case of those who have acted unworthily."

=== Power balance between the council ===
The power balance between the council depended on the position each members held and the amount of koku they held. Ieyasu was entitled with the position of inner minister (Naidaijin) in the fifth month of 1596. Maeda was acting as counselor of the first rank (Dainagon)and the other three were counselors of the second rank (Chunagon). Ieyasu was in the highest position among the members and his ownership of a great amount of koku allowed him to secure his position among other Elders. In general, 10,000 koku was believed to be equivalent to having 250 soldiers in one's control, so the amount of Koku (石) represented not only the income of each daimyō, but also how much military power they held. Hideyoshi himself owned approximately 2,000,000 koku, not including the lands held by his most trusted vassals. Ieyasu was also known as a powerful military commander, and Hideyoshi's fear of Ieyasu and riots in favor of Ieyasu also led him to appoint Ieyasu as a member of the Council of Five Elders.

The amount of potential income, measured in koku, that each council member held (one koku = 4.96 bushels or 278.3 liters of rice):

- Tokugawa Ieyasu: 2,400,000 koku
- Maeda Toshiie: 830,000 koku
- Ukita Hideie: 570,000 koku
- Uesugi Kagekatsu: 1,200,000 koku
- Mori Terumoto: 1,120,000 koku

== Tokugawa hegemony ==
Ieyasu engaged his sons and daughters into political marriages which became a cause of disagreement between the Elders and Commissioners. Ieyasu married his son Tadateru to Date Masamune's daughter Irohahime. The cause for disagreement in these matters were due to statements in ”The wall writings of Osaka Castle" (大阪城中壁書 Osakajochu-kabegaki) of 1595 that marriages would need the consultation of both Elders and Commissioners. The Commissioners called for Ieyasu's resignation on the grounds of these marriages. One of the retainers, Ishida Mitsunari, complained about this matter to Maeda Toshiie. Ieyasu insisted that it was not a big matter; and this issue was resolved by Horio Yoshiharu, who happened to be a friend of Ieyasu.

=== Rise of conflict ===
After the death of Hideyoshi, friction generated between the council members. Two factions formed, the Bunchiha (文治派; those who wished for a state governed by a specialized civil service) and the Bundanha (武断派, those in favor of a strong military authority); Tokugawa Ieyasu was part of the bundanha. One year after Maeda Toshiie died, Ieyasu saw his chance to take control. The death of Maeda Toshiie in 1599 made Ieyasu the most experienced of the Five Elders. Finally, due to the fact that Uesugi Kagekatsu had been illegally constructing and restoring forts, Ieyasu was able to justify going to battle which led to the Battle of Sekigahara in 1600. Following the battle, in 1603, Ieyasu became Shōgun while Hideyori was declared naidaijin. Ieyasu sent his granddaughter, Senhime to Osaka to marry Hideyori in order to stabilize the relationship between the two families.

The Tokugawa Clan's Crest (Mon)

Tokugawa Ieyasu rose to power while originally working in the name of Toyotomi Hideyori. Ieyasu's power seemed to be threatened by Hideyori in a long series of plots both against Ieyasu and Hideyori occurred followed by the multiple battles of the Siege of Osaka (1614–15). Tokugawa Ieyasu was victorious against the Toyotomi clan, eliminating them completely, thus cementing his place as ruler of Japan.

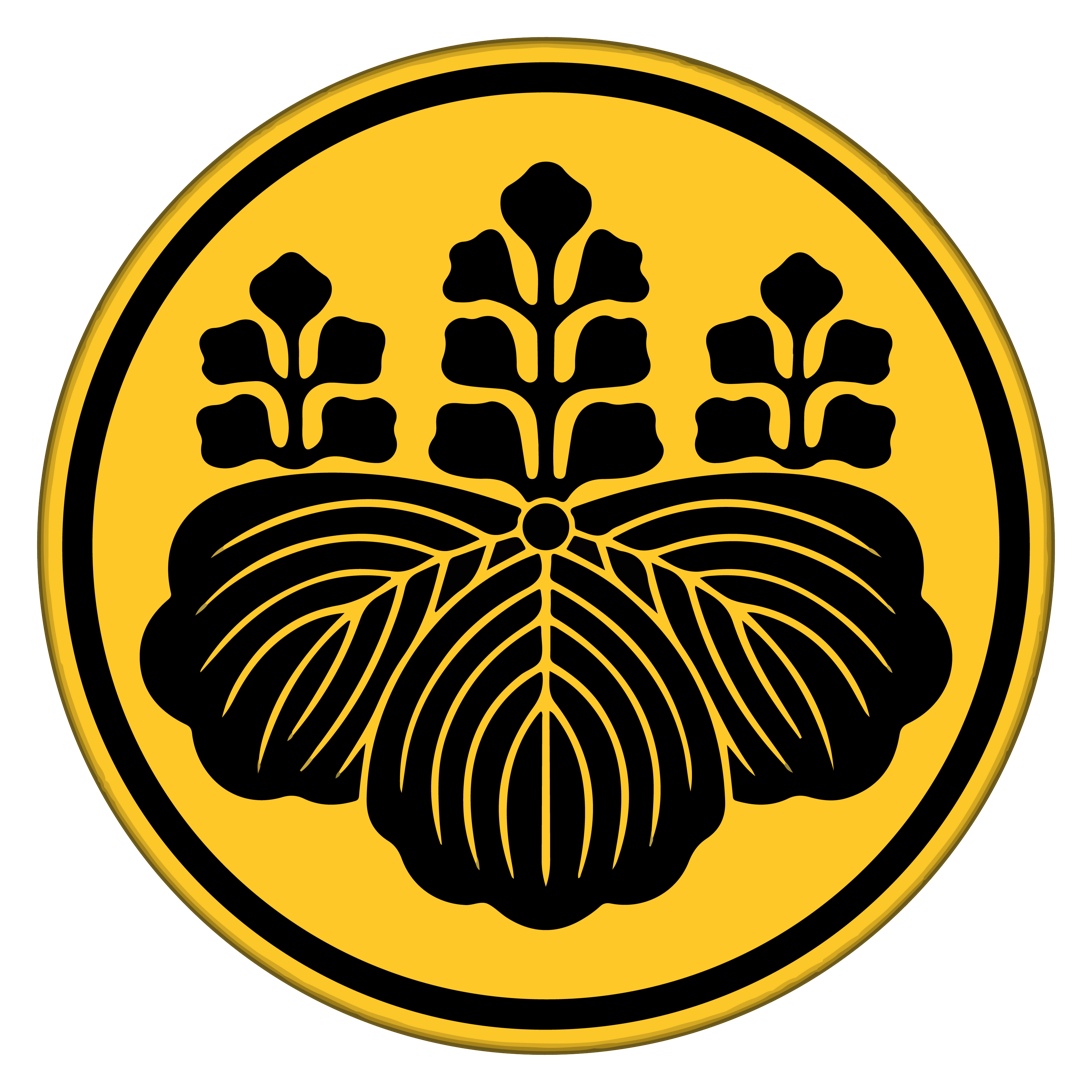
The Toyotomi Clan's Crest (Mon)

Following the Tokugawa victory at the Siege of Osaka in 1615, Ieyasu was not satisfied with destruction of Hideyori alone, but in order to make sure the Toyotomi clan would not be able to return to power in the future, he had as many as possible of the Toyotomi family killed, or in the case of Hideyori's daughter, placed in a nunnery. Ieyasu had Hideyori's son Kunimatsu, then 8 years old, killed at the Rokujō riverbed (Rokujō-Gawara) in Kyoto.

== In popular culture ==
The Council of Five Elders can also be seen in Japanese historical drama, Taiga Drama, which is broadcast by NHK. This topic is briefly mentioned in Gunshi Kanbei and Tenchijin, and more in detail in Sanadamaru. In the 31st episode of Sanadamaru, a brief explanation of why the Council of Five Elders didn't work out as Hideyoshi expected is explained and we can also see that Elders were referred as Otonashu (老衆). The drama also shows that early death of Maeda Toshiie had led to Ieyasu gaining more power, and Ishida Mitsunari's lack of popularity among the Toyotomi family caused a lot people to support Ieyasu during the Battle of Sekigahara.

== See also ==
- Yodo-dono
- Azuchi-Momoyama Period
- Toyotomi Hideyoshi
- Toyotomi Hideyori
- Battle of Sekigahara
- Five Commissioners
- Tokugawa Shogunate
- Edo Period
