= Hashiba Hidekatsu =

Japanese samurai

- 羽柴 秀勝
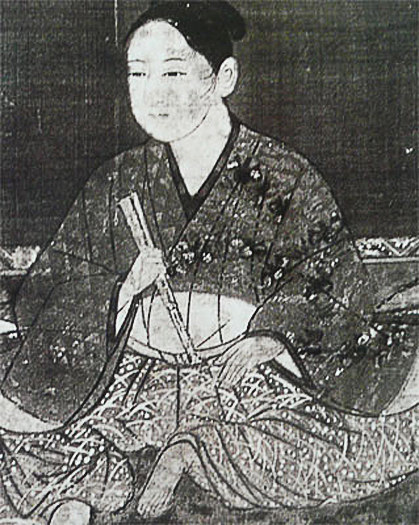
- Born: 1567; Owari Province
- Died: January 29, 1586 (aged 18–19); Kameyama Castle, Tanba Province
- Relatives: Oda Nobunaga (father); Toyotomi Hideyoshi (adopted father)
- Military career
- Allegiance: Oda clan Toyotomi clan
- Nickname: Otsugimaru
- Commands: Kameyama Castle (Kyoto)
- Conflicts: Battle of Yamazaki (1582); Battle of Shizugatake (1583); Battle of Komaki and Nagakute (1584)

Hashiba Hidekatsu (羽柴 秀勝; 1567 – January 29, 1586) was a Japanese samurai, also known as Oda Hidekatsu, the fourth son of the famed feudal warlord Oda Nobunaga and was adopted by Toyotomi Hideyoshi at a young age.

At the time of Nobunaga's death in 1582, Hidekatsu was at Kojima in Bizen Province. Shortly after Nobunaga's death, Hidekatsu assisted Hideyoshi during the Battle of Yamazaki, Hidekatsu and his biological older brother, Oda Nobutaka, were used as a banner of a battle of revenge, and defeated Akechi Mitsuhide.

During the funeral of Nobunaga, he held his birth father's mortuary tablet (ihai). Afterwards, Hidekatsu received Kameyama Castle in Tanba Province (modern day Kameoka, Kyoto Prefecture).

He also served Hideyoshi during the Battle of Shizugatake in 1583 and Battle of Komaki and Nagakute in 1584. Hidekatsu suddenly died in 1586, with many people believing that Hidekatsu was killed on the orders of Hideyoshi.

== Family ==
- Father: Oda Nobunaga (1536–1582)
- Adopted Father: Toyotomi Hideyoshi (1536–1598)
- Brothers:
  - Oda Nobutada (1557–1582)
  - Oda Nobukatsu (1558–1630)
  - Oda Nobutaka (1558–1583)
  - Oda Katsunaga (1568–1582)
  - Oda Nobuhide (1571–1597)
  - Oda Nobutaka (1576–1602)
  - Oda Nobuyoshi (1573–1615)
  - Oda Nobusada (1574–1624)
  - Oda Nobuyoshi (died 1609)
  - Oda Nagatsugu (died 1600)
  - Oda Nobumasa (1554–1647)
- Sisters:
  - Tokuhime (1559–1636)
  - Fuyuhime (1561–1641)
  - Hideko (died 1632)
  - Eihime (1574–1623)
  - Hōonin
  - Sannomarudono (died 1603)
  - Tsuruhime
