= Siege of Minakuchi =

1600 battle in Kansai region of Japan

The Siege of Minakuchi was a conflict between Natsuka Masaie of the Toyotomi clan and generals of the Tokugawa clan, taking place at Minakuchi Okayama castle, following the Tokugawa victory at the Battle of Sekigahara in 1600.

== Siege ==
During the Battle of Sekigahara, Natsuka was loyal to the Western Army under Ishida Mitsunari, but was unable to participate in any combat. After the defeat of the Western Army at the Battle of Sekigahara, Natsuka fled to Minakuchi Okayama castle, but was pursued by the Tokugawa generals, who immediately laid siege to the castle. Natsuka promptly set fire to the castle and committed seppuku before the Tokugawa forces could reach him.

== Aftermath ==
Following the defeat of Natsuka's forces, the castle was seized as tenryō by the Tokugawa shogunate. Natsuka was later buried at Anraku-ji, in Shiga Prefecture.

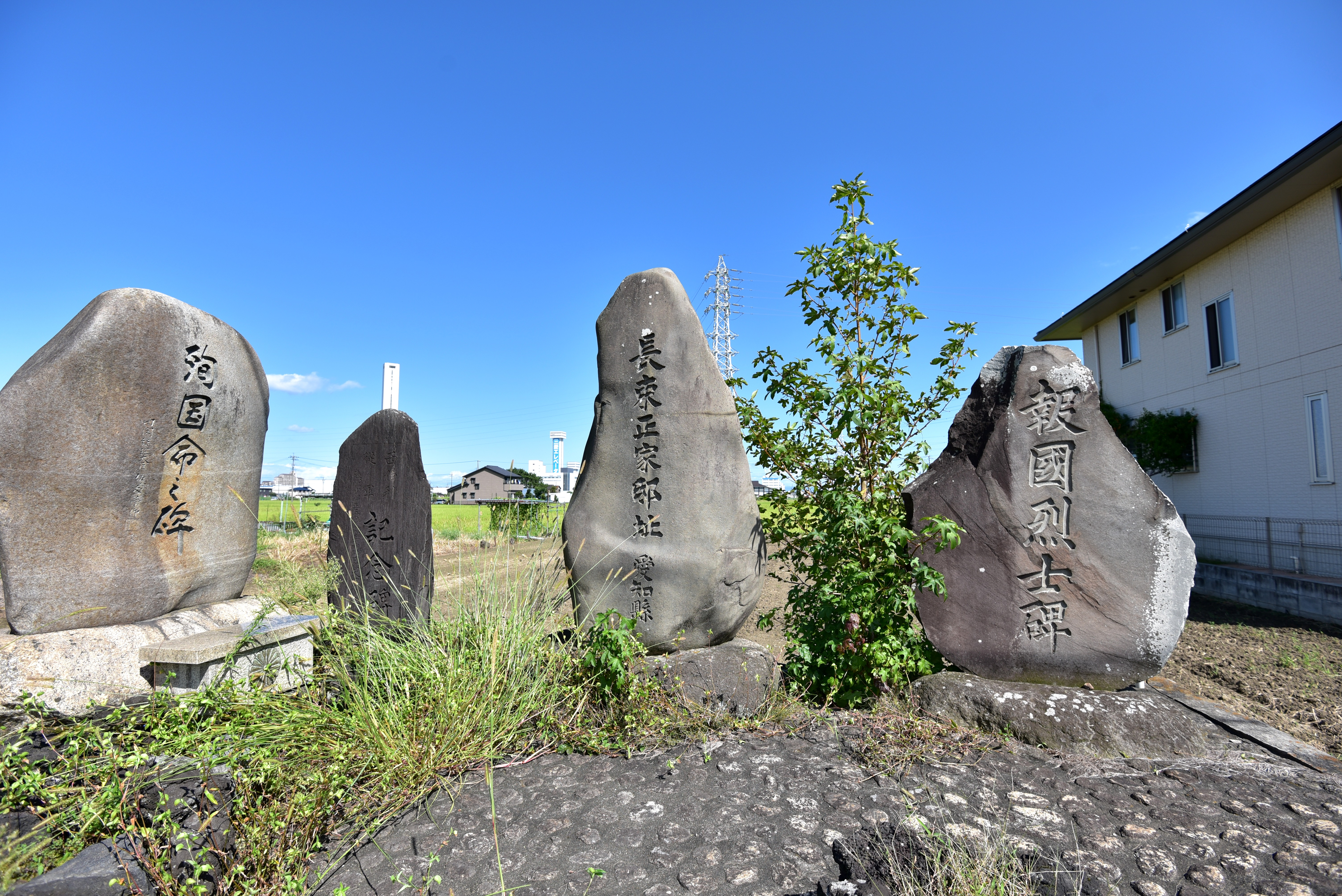
The tomb of Natsuka
