= Kuriko Namino =

Japanese actress

- 波乃 久里子
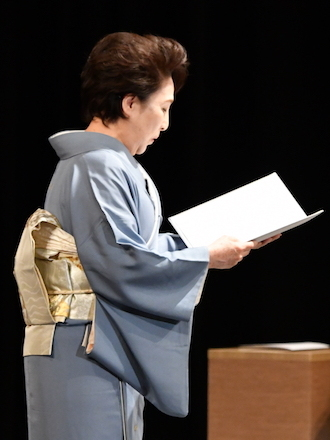
- 2019
- Born: December 1, 1945 (age 80); Kamakura, Kanagawa, Japan
- Occupation: Actress
- Years active: 1950–present

Kuriko Namino (波乃 久里子, Namino Kuriko) (born December 1, 1945, in Kamakura, Japan) is an actress. Her brother Nakamura Kanzaburō XVIII was an actor in kabuki, theatre, television and commercials.

== Filmography ==
=== Film ===
- By Player (2000)
- My Grandpa (2003)

=== Television ===
- Akō Rōshi (1964)
- Minamoto no Yoshitsune (1966)
- Aoi Tokugawa Sandai (2000) – Ohatsu
- Brother and Sister (2018) – Kikuko

== Honours ==
- Medal with Purple Ribbon (2011)
- Order of the Rising Sun, 4th Class, Gold Rays with Rosette (2016)
