= Kei Suma =

Japanese actor

Kei Suma すまけい
- Born: Kei Suma; 4 September 1935; Kunashir Island, Hokkaido, Japan
- Died: 7 December 2013 (aged 78); Tokyo, Japan
- Occupations: Film and television actor
- Years active: 1985–2010

Kei Suma (Japanese: すまけい; 4 September 1935 – 7 December 2013) was a Japanese film and television actor, whose career spanned 25 years.

Born on Kunashir Island under Japanese rule, Suma began his acting career in 1985. He was best known for his roles in A Class to Remember (1993) and Pretty Woman (2003).

Kei Suma died of liver cancer on 7 December 2013, aged 78, in Tokyo.

== Filmography ==
=== Film ===
- Final Take (1986) – Ogura
- Hope and Pain (1988)

=== Television ===
- Kenpō wa Madaka (1996) – Tokujiro Kanamori
- Aoi Tokugawa Sandai (2000) – Date Masamune
