= Kameyama Castle (Kyoto) =

Castle in Japan

Coordinates: 35°0′48.82″N 135°34′52.32″E

- 亀山城
- Kameoka, Kyoto, Kyoto Prefecture, Japan
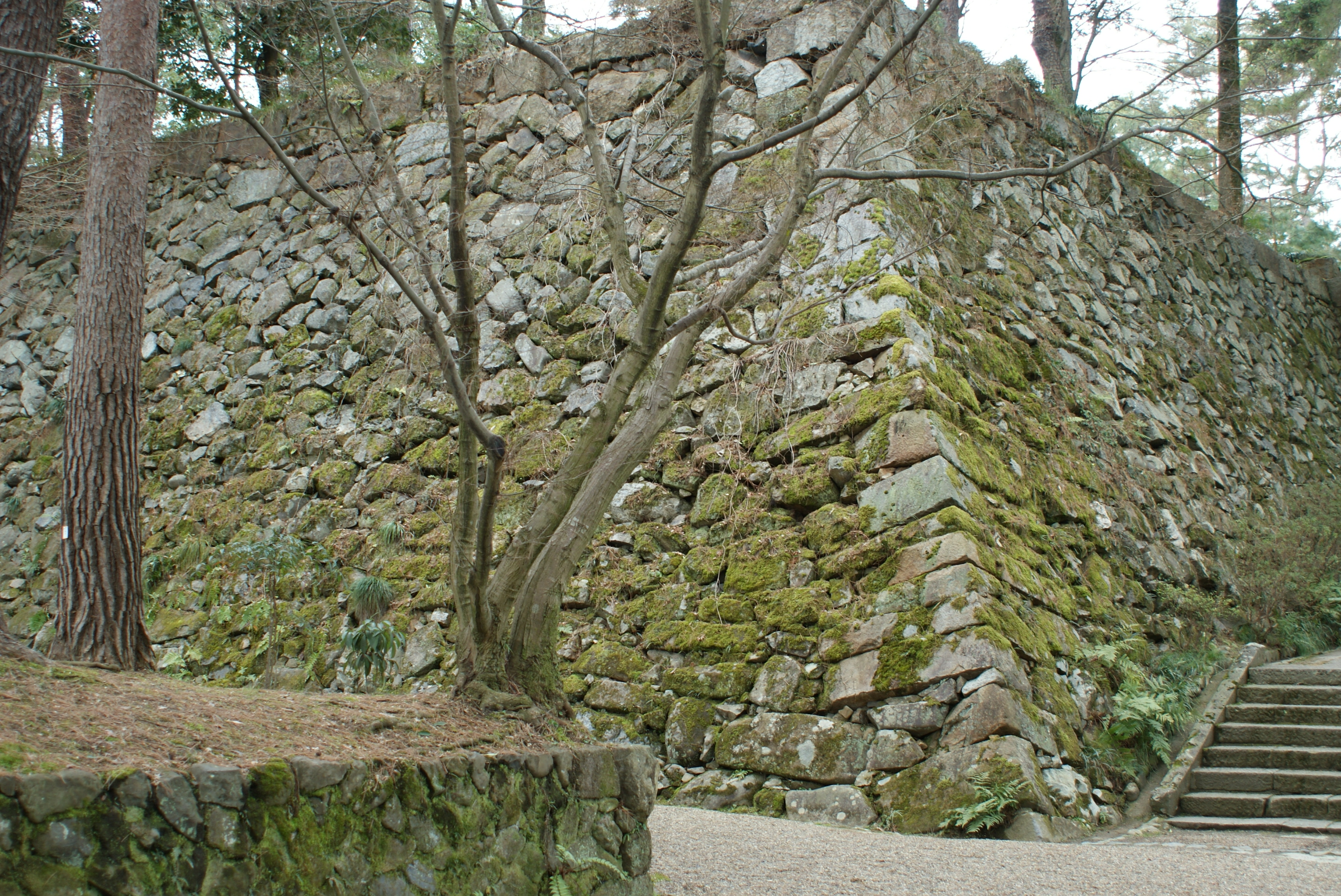
- Stone wall of Honmaru compound

Site information
- Type: Hira style castle
- Controlled by: Akechi clan/Oda clan
- Condition: ruins

Location

Site history
- Built: 1578
- Built by: Akechi Mitsuhide
- Materials: Stone walls
- Demolished: 1877

Garrison information
- Past commanders: Akechi clan, Toyotomi Hidekatsu, Kobayakawa Hideaki, Maeda Geni

Kameyama Castle (亀山城, Kameyama-jō) is a castle located in Kameoka, Kyoto Prefecture, Japan. It guarded the northwest passage into Kyoto for nearly three hundred years.

The castle was built by Oda Nobunaga's vassal Akechi Mitsuhide because he needed a front base to conquer Tanba region. He set out for Honnō-ji (Honnō-ji Incident) from the castle in 1582. After the Meiji period revolution, all the remaining structures of the castle were removed or destroyed.

In 2019, Akechi Mistuhide's statue was built in the castle.

Ten'on-kyō (天恩郷), the administrative headquarters of the Oomoto religion, is located adjacent to the castle.
