= Go-Bugyō =

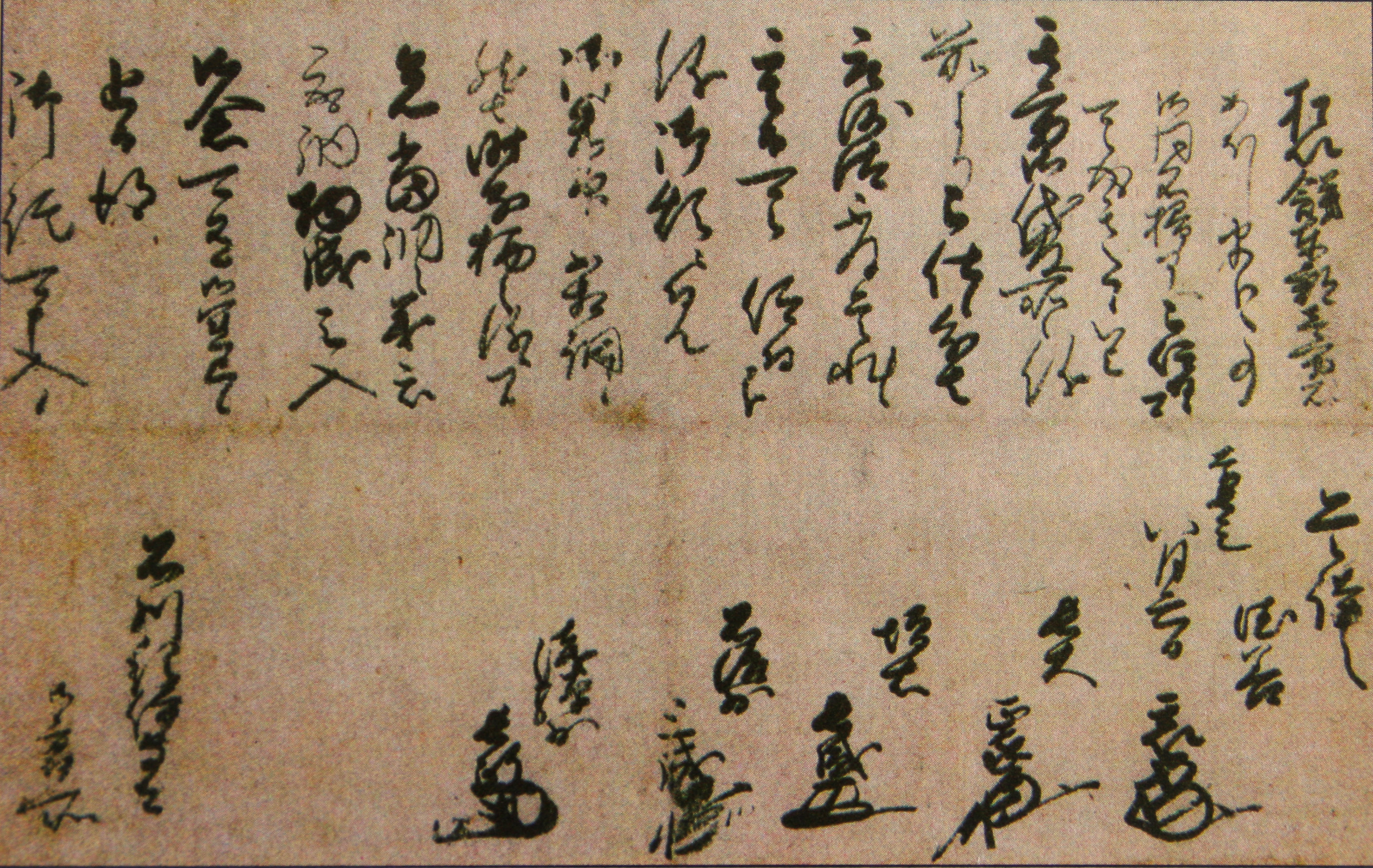
Joint letter of Toyotomi's Go-Bugyō.

The Go-Bugyō (五奉行, go-Bugyō) or Five Commissioners, was an administrative organ of feudal Japan which later evolved into the Go-Tairō (Council of Five Elders). It was established by lord Toyotomi Hideyoshi when he became kampaku (Imperial regent) in 1585.

== Duty ==
The Commissioners were charged with governing the capital city of Kyoto and the surrounding areas, which were called kinai or the Home Provinces. Hideyoshi, however, still maintained a very active interest in administrative matters, and it has been theorized by some scholars that the Go-Bugyō, unlike the Go-Tairō that replaced it, served more as a committee of specialists and advisors than a group that actually enacted policy decisions.

The original five appointed were Asano Nagamasa, Maeda Gen'i, Mashita Nagamori, Natsuka Masaie, and Ishida Mitsunari. All five were samurai from Ōmi and Owari provinces, and strong supporters of Hideyoshi's former lord, Oda Nobunaga.

Asano Nagamasa, held seniority over the Commissioners, who were charged with governing the capital of Kyoto and the Home Provinces or Kinai. A close advisor to Hideyoshi, Asano devised the land survey and a number of other policies enacted under his rule.

Maeda Gen'i, a Buddhist abbot also known as Abbot Tokuzen-in, was given the post of Shoshi-dai, or Commissioner for the Metropolitan Area (of Kyoto). As a result, he addressed a variety of religious matters, as well as acting as a judge in civil disputes.

Ishida Mitsunari was made Commissioner of Police, and also governed the area of Sakai near Osaka. Sakai was a major port, and so Ishida dealt heavily with the governance and control of various aspects of trade as well.

Natsuka Masaie became Commissioner of Finance, and Mashida Nagamori was assigned to Public Works.

== List of go-bugyō ==
- Asano Nagamasa
- Maeda Gen'i
- Mashita Nagamori
- Ishida Mitsunari
- Natsuka Masaie

== See also ==
- Bugyō
