= Mashita Nagamori =

Japanese feudal lord (1545–1615)

Mashita Nagamori 増田 長盛
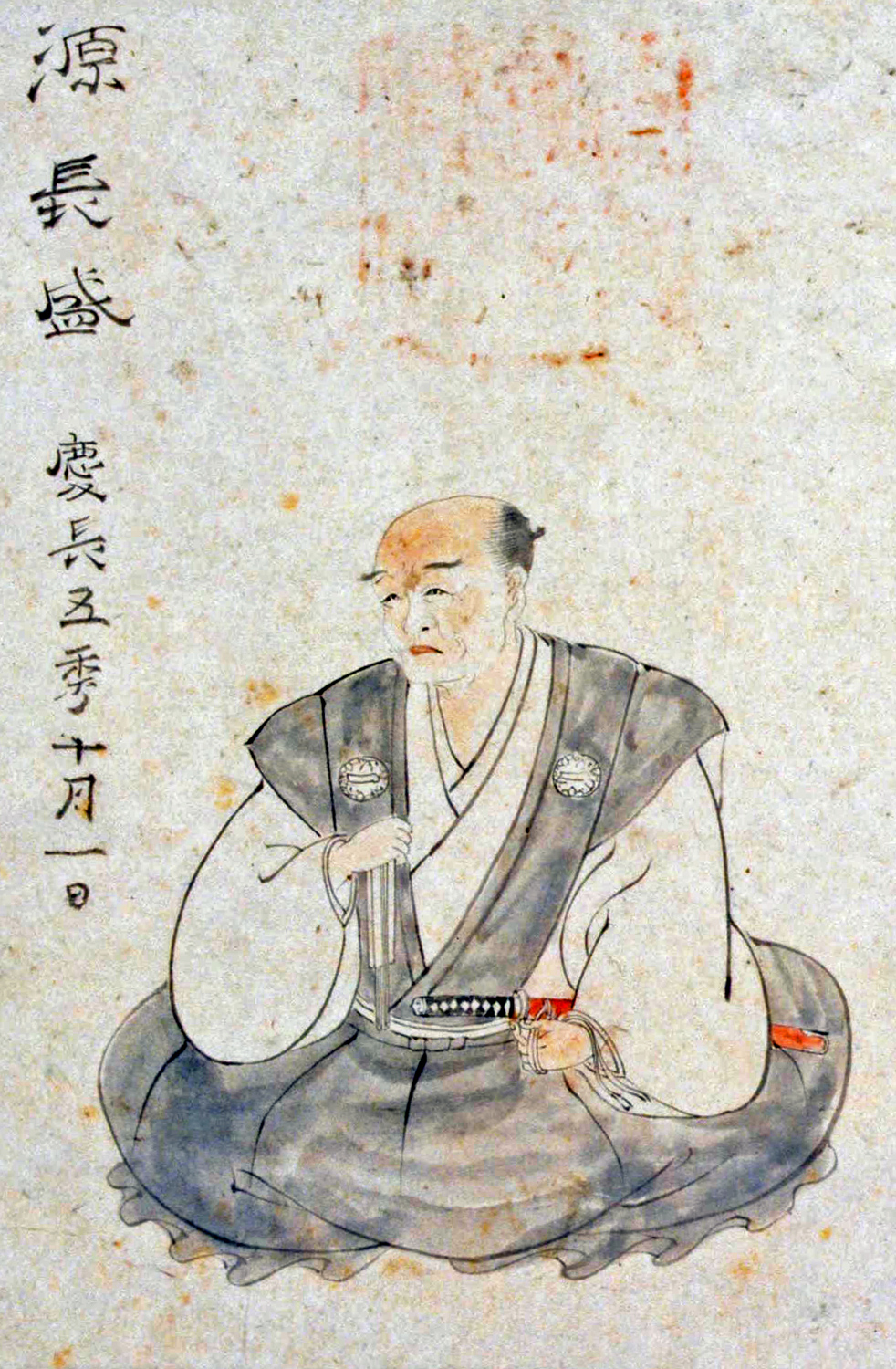

Lord of Koriyama Castle
- In office 1585–1600
- Succeeded by: Koriki Kiyonaga

Personal details
- Born: 1545 Nakashima-no-kori, Mashita-mura, Owari Province or Asai-gori, Mashita-go, Ōmi Province
- Died: June 23, 1615 (aged 69–70) Anraku-ji, Niiza, Saitama
- Children: Mashita Moritsugu

Military service
- Allegiance: Oda clan Toyotomi clan Western Army
- Rank: Go-Bugyo
- Commands: Koriyama Castle
- Battles/wars: Korean Campaign (1592-1598)

Mashita Nagamori (増田 長盛; 1545 – June 23, 1615) was a daimyō in Azuchi–Momoyama period, and one of the Go-Bugyō appointed by Toyotomi Hideyoshi. Also called Niemon (仁右衛門) or by his court title, Uemon-no-jō (右衛門尉). He was sent to Korea as one of the Three Bureaucrats with Ishida Mitsunari and Asano Nagamasa.

== Service under Hideyoshi ==
Nagamori was born in Nakashima-no-kori, Mashita-mura, Owari Province or Asai-gori, Mashita-go, Ōmi Province and served Hashiba Hideyoshi (Toyotomi Hideyoshi) when he had been a retainer of Oda Nobunaga.

Since he shined with domestic affairs such as Cadastral Surveys by Hideyoshi and diplomatic negotiations with Uesugi Kagekatsu, Hideyoshi gave him 200,000 koku at Koriyama Castle, Yamato Province and also appointed by Hideyoshi to a Commission of Five (Go-Bugyō) along with Ishida Mitsunari, Maeda Gen'i, Asano Nagamasa and Natsuka Masaie.

Nagamori took part in the Battle of Bunroku (in 1592) and the Battle of Keicho (in 1596).

== Sekigahara campaign ==
After Hideyoshi died, in 1600, Nagamori took part in Ishida Mitsunari's force when he put up Mōri Terumoto who was a member of the council of Five Elders and raised their army to Tokugawa Ieyasu. However, Nagamori was involved in an intrigue with Ieyasu, he secretly sends Ieyasu news about the meeting of western commander at Sawayama castle. He did not take part in the Battle of Sekigahara on October 21, but rather held a fort at Osaka Castle. After the battle, Ieyasu seized Nagamori's domain, but spared his life and left him to Kōriki Kiyonaga, a retainer of Ieyasu's and lord of Iwatsuki Castle, in Musashi Province.

== Death ==
In 1615 at the Siege of Osaka, Nagamori's son Mashita Moritsugu, who had served Tokugawa Yoshinao, escaped and joined the Toyotomi Clan's force. As a result, Nagamori was commanded to commit suicide.

He died at 71. His grave is at Anraku-ji, Niiza, Saitama, Saitama Prefecture.
