= Asano Nagamasa =

Japanese military advisor (1546–1611)

- 浅野 長政
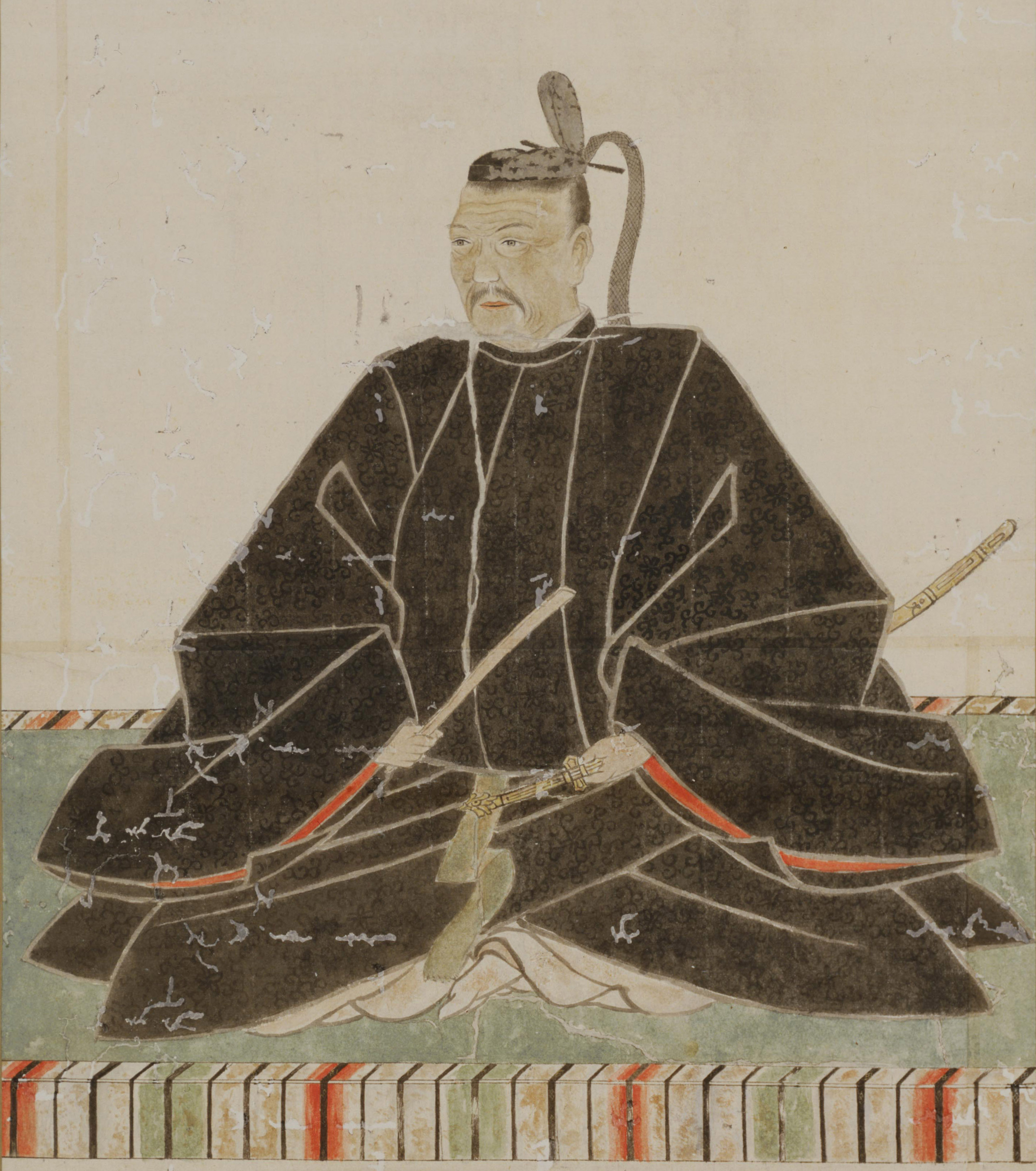

Lord of Sakamoto Castle
- In office 1585–1586
- Preceded by: Niwa Nagahide

Lord of Makabe Domain
- In office 1606–1611
- Succeeded by: Asano Nagashige

Personal details
- Born: 1546
- Died: May 29, 1611 (aged 64–65)
- Children: Asano Yoshinaga; Asano Nagaakira
- Relatives: O-Ne (sister in law); Toyotomi Hideyoshi (brother in law)

Military service
- Allegiance: Oda clan Toyotomi clan
- Rank: Go-Bugyo
- Unit: Asano clan
- Battles/wars: Tenshō Iga War; Siege of Takamatsu; Battle of Shizugatake; Kyūshū campaign Odawara campaign Kunohe Rebellion; Korean campaign

Asano Nagamasa (浅野 長政; 1546 – May 29, 1611) was the brother-in-law of Toyotomi Hideyoshi and one of his chief advisors. Asano also fought for Oda Nobunaga and Hideyoshi in a number of campaigns during the Sengoku period of the 16th century in Japan. He was sent to Korea as one of the Three Bureaucrats with Ishida Mitsunari and Mashita Nagamori.

== Biography ==
He was the son of Yasui Shigetsugu, Lord of Miyago castle (Owari province), a descendant of Hatakeyama Iekuni, Shugo (Governor) of Kawachi province, descending from Ashikaga Yoshikane (1154-1199). Yoshikane was the third son of Minamoto no Yoshiyasu, also called Ashikaga Yoshiyasu (1127-1157), founder of the Ashikaga clan, grandson of the Chinjufu-shōgun (Commander-in-chief of the defense of the North) Minamoto no Yoshiie (1039-1106), and a descendant of the Emperor Seiwa (850-881), the 56th Emperor of Japan.

He was adopted by his maternal uncle, Asano Nagakatsu, Lord of Asano castle, his mother's younger brother. He succeeded him as the fourteenth head of the Asano clan.

Until Nagakatsu, the Asano descended directly from the Toki clan and Minamoto no Yorimitsu (948-1021). After Nagamasa, the Asano are direct descendants of the Hatakeyama clan and the Ashikaga clan.

Since O-Ne, who was born Sugihara Yasuko, daughter of Sugihara Sadatoshi, a descendant of Taira no Sadamori, and the Emperor Kammu (735-806), and was adopted by her maternal uncle Asano Nagakatsu, a descendant of Minamoto no Yorimitsu (944-1021), and the Emperor Seiwa (850-881), married Kinoshita Tokichiro (later Toyotomi Hideyoshi), despite her mother Asahidono opposition to this marriage because of the difference in social status with her husband, Nagamasa became a brother-in-law to Hideyoshi.

In 1581, he fought in the Second Tenshō Iga War under Oda Nobunaga against inhabitants of Iga, at Iga province.

In 1582, Nagamasa also accompanied Hideyoshi in his campaign against the Mōri clan, at Siege of Takamatsu.

In 1583, he distinguished himself in the Battle of Shizugatake and was given 20,000 koku in Otsu (Omi Province).

In 1587, he served in the campaign to suppress Kyushu and received Obama Domain (80,000 koku) (Wakasa province).

In 1590, He fought for Hideyoshi against the Hōjō clan at Siege of Odawara, he captured Iwatsuki and Edo castles, also fought against the Kunohe Rebellion in 1591.

In 1593, made a great contribution to the dispatch of troops for the Invasion of Korea and was given 215,000 koku of Fuchu (Kai province).

Asano was also appointed by Hideyoshi to a Commission of Five (Go-Bugyō) along with Ishida Mitsunari, Maeda Gen'i, Mashita Nagamori and Natsuka Masaie. Asano held seniority over the Commissioners, who were charged with governing the capital of Kyoto and the Home Provinces or Kinai. A close advisor to Hideyoshi, Asano devised the land survey and a number of other policies enacted under his rule.

In 1598, Hideyoshi's invasions were coming to an end, and Asano was sent to Korea with his fellow Commissioner Ishida Mitsunari to arrange for Japanese withdrawal. Asano was assured by the generals that the war was going well, and that they were on the verge of victory. Ishida disagreed, however, and supported withdrawal from Korea. Returning to Japan, daimyō (feudal lords) from across the country became involved in the debate, and the disagreement grew into a major governmental rift. The Go-Bugyō disbanded soon afterwards, having already been replaced by the Council of Five Elders (Tairō) by Hideyoshi before his death.

== Retired ==
In 1599, he transferred the family estate to his son Asano Yoshinaga and retired.

In 1606, he was given the Makabe estate, in Hitachi Province (50,000 koku) as retirement stipend.

== Family ==
- Father: Yasui Shigetsugu, Lord of Miyago castle, descendant of Hatakeyama Iekuni, Shugo (Governor) of Kawachi province, descending from Ashikaga Yoshikane (1154-1199).
- Mother: daughter of Asano Nagaaki
- Foster Father: Asano Nagakatsu (d.1575), younger brother of his mother; Lord of Yasui castle, then Lord of Asano castle, a descendant of the Toki clan and of Minamoto no Yorimitsu (944-1021)
- Foster Mother: Nanamagari-dono (d.1603), daughter of Sugihara Ietoshi, a descendant of Taira no Sadamori
- Wife: Cho-Sei-in (d.1616), adopted daughter of Asano Nagakatsu, daughter of Sugihara Sadatoshi and Asahidono
- Children:
  - Asano Yoshinaga by Cho-Sei-in
  - Asano Nagaakira by Cho-Sei-in
  - Asano Nagashige (1588-1632) by Cho-Sei-in
  - daughter married Sugihara Nagafusa
  - daughter married Hori Chikayoshi
  - daughter married Matsudaira Sadatsuna
  - daughter married Sadao Mitsusada

== See also ==
- List of daimyōs from the Sengoku period
