= Maeda Gen'i =

Buddhist priest

- 前田 玄以
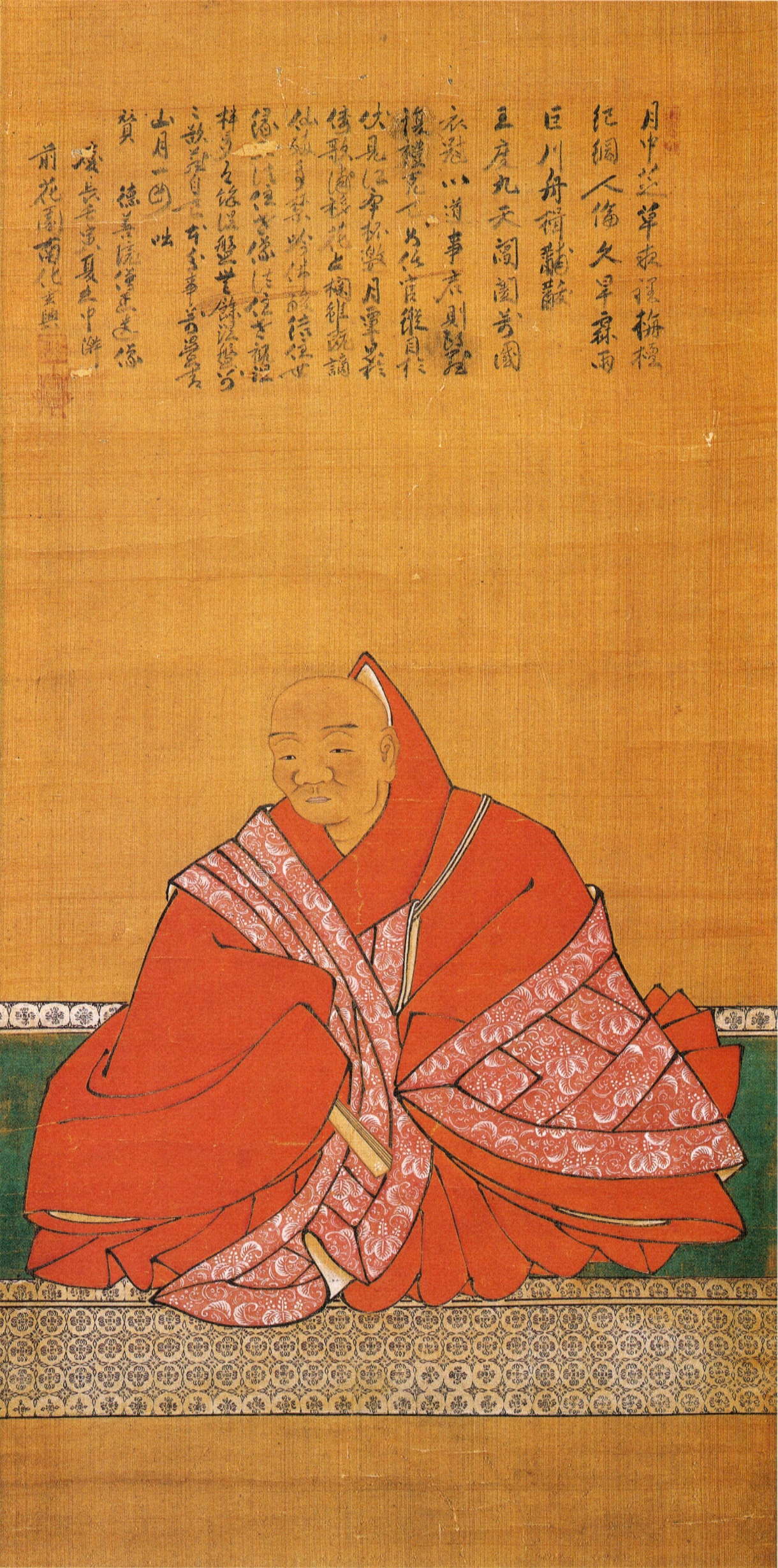

Lord of Kameyama Castle (Kyoto)
- In office 1582–1602
- Preceded by: Akechi Mitsuhide

Personal details
- Born: 1539 Mino Province
- Died: 9 July 1602 (aged 62–63)
- Occupation: Buddhist priest
- Known for: The Deputy of Kyoto (1582); Laid the ground work of Fushimi Castle (1592); Member of Go-Bugyō (1595)

Military service
- Allegiance: Oda clan Toyotomi clan
- Rank: Go-Bugyō
- Commands: Kameyama Castle (Kyoto)
- Battles/wars: Honnoji Incident

Maeda Gen'i (前田 玄以; 1539 – July 9, 1602) was a Buddhist priest from Mt. Hiei, retainer of Oda Nobunaga and later one of Toyotomi Hideyoshi's Go-Bugyō, along with Ishida Mitsunari, Asano Nagamasa, Mashita Nagamori and Natsuka Masaie. He entered the service of Oda Nobunaga sometime before 1570.

== Biography ==
=== Service under Nobunaga ===
In his youth, Gen’i entered the priesthood in Mino and either became a Zen priest or monk on Mount Hiei. Alternatively, he may have been the abbot at the Komatsu Temple in Owari Province.

Later, Gen’i was serve the Oda clan, and upon orders of Oda Nobunaga, He became a retainer of Nobunaga’s eldest son and designated heir, Oda Nobutada.

In 1582, during the Honnoji Incident, Gen’i was located, together with Nobutada, at the Nijō palace in Kyōto. Upon orders of Nobutada, Gen’i fled with Nobutada’s infant son, Sanpōshi (Oda Hidenobu), going from Gifu Castle in Mino to Kiyosu Castle in Owari.

=== Service under Hideyoshi ===
In 1582, Gen'i was appointed to be a deputy over Kyoto. After the death of Oda Nobunaga that same year, Gen'i went on to serve under Toyotomi Hideyoshi, at Kameyama Castle (Kyoto) in Tanba Province, Gen'i received a 50,000-koku fief.

In 1592, he was to lay the ground work for the Fushimi Castle.

In 1595, Gen'i was named among the "Five Commissioners" by Hideyoshi. As a member of this council, Gen'i was "concerned with national affairs and subordinate only to Hideyoshi". In addition to managing a great deal of other affairs, Maeda also oversaw the reception of the likes of the Emperor and representatives of the Jesuits to Hideyoshi's Jurakudai palace.
