= Natsuka Masaie =

Japanese daimyō

- 長束 正家
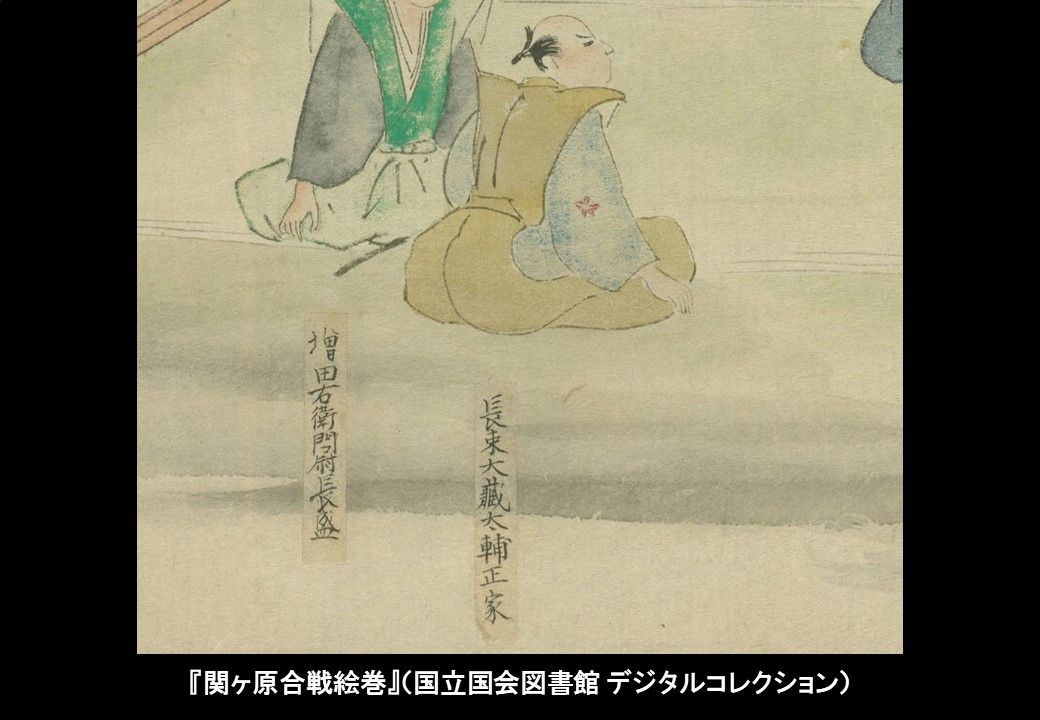

Lord of Minakuchi Castle
- In office 1585–1600

Personal details
- Born: 1562 Owari Province
- Died: November 8, 1600 (aged 37–38) Anraku-ji, Shiga Prefecture

Military service
- Allegiance: Niwa clan Oda clan Toyotomi clan Western Army
- Rank: Go-Bugyo
- Commands: Minakuchi Castle
- Battles/wars: Siege of Takamatsu (1582); Siege of Oshi (1590); Battle of Sekigahara (1600)

Natsuka Masaie (長束 正家; 1562 – November 8, 1600) was a daimyō in the Azuchi-Momoyama period. He served Niwa Nagahide and later Hideyoshi. He was one of the Go-Bugyō, or five commissioners, appointed by Toyotomi Hideyoshi.

== Biography ==
He was born in Owari Province. Masaie served Niwa Nagahide who was a retainer of the Oda clan. Later, because the domain of the Niwa clan was badly reduced after Hashiba Hideyoshi (Toyotomi Hideyoshi) ended the Sengoku period by reunifying Japan, Masaie served him and was given the rule of Minakuchi, Ōmi Province.

Hideyoshi congratulated Masaie on arithmetical faculty and appointed him as one of the Go-Bugyō, along with Ishida Mitsunari, Maeda Gen'i, Asano Nagamasa and Mashita Nagamori.

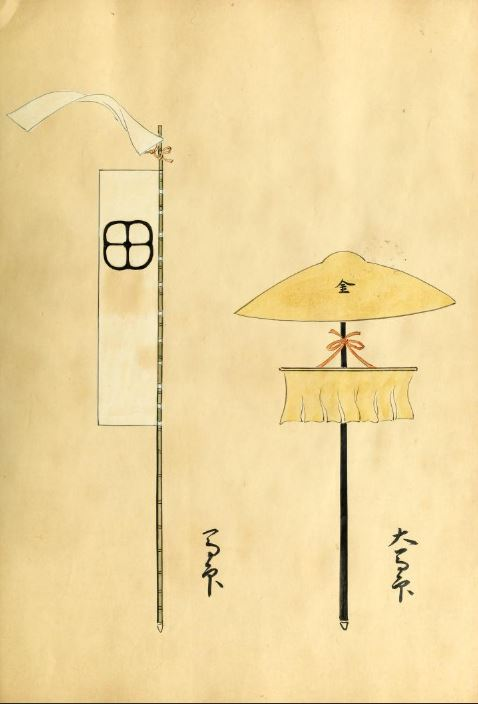
Natsuka Massie battle standards

== Battle of Sekigahara ==
After Hideyoshi died, in 1600 Masaie and Ishida Mitsunari who was also one of the Go-Bugyō, put up Mōri Terumoto and raised their army against Tokugawa Ieyasu.

At the battle of Sekigahara, Masaie lined their army on Nangu-san with Mōri Hidemoto and Kikkawa Hiroie. However, Masaie was prevented from fighting by Hiroie and finally routed to Minakuchi. Setting fire to Minakuchi Castle, he committed suicide. His grave is at Anraku-ji, in Shiga Prefecture.

== See also ==
Siege of Minakuchi

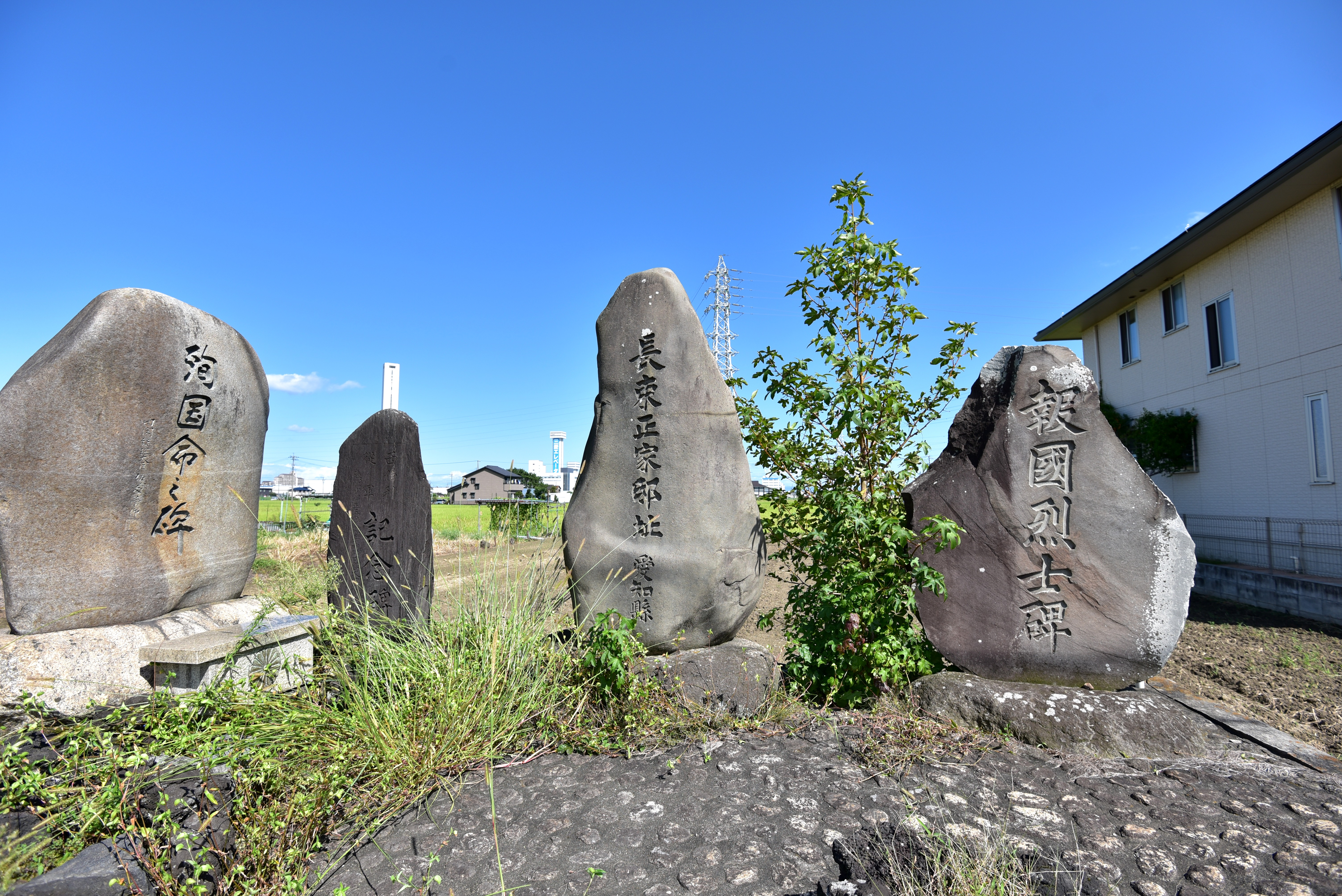
Tomb of Natsuka Massie
