= Tsutsui =

Tsutsui (written: 筒井 meaning "round well") is a Japanese surname. Notable people with the surname include:

- Hajime Tsutsui (筒井 はじめ, born 1970), Japanese artist
- Tsutsui Jōmyō Meishū (筒井 浄妙 明秀), Japanese warrior monk
- Tsutsui Junkei (筒井 順慶, 1549–1584), Japanese daimyō
- Tsutsui Junshō (筒井 順昭, 1523–1550), Japanese daimyō
- Kazuya Tsutsui (筒井 和也, born 1981), Japanese baseball player
- Mihoko Tsutsui (筒井 視穂子, born 1985), Japanese volleyball player
- Nobutaka Tsutsui (筒井 信隆, born 1944), Japanese politician
- Noriaki Tsutsui (筒井 紀章, born 1976), Japanese footballer
- Ryohei Ron Tsutsui (born 1977), Japanese film producer
- Tsutsui Sadatsugu (筒井 定次, 1562–1615), Japanese samurai
- Shan Tsutsui (born 1971), American politician
- William Tsutsui, American academic
- Yasutaka Tsutsui (筒井 康隆, born 1934), Japanese writer and actor

== See also ==
- Tsutsui clan, Japanese clan
- Tsutsui Station (disambiguation), multiple railway stations in Japan
