= Siege of Hijiyama =

1581 siege in Japan

- Part of the Tenshō Iga War
Date	1581
Location	Ueno, Iga province, Japan
Result	Oda victory; castle destroyed

Belligerents
Forces of Oda Nobunaga	Forces of Iga Sōkoku Ikki

Commanders and leaders
Gamō Ujisato; Tsutsui Junkei; Wakisaka Yasuharu	Momota Tōbei; Ozawa Tomohisa

Strength
10,700 total (7,000 under Ujisato and Junkei) (3,700 under Yasuharu)	1,000+

The 1581 siege of Hijiyama (比自山城の戦い, hijiyama-jō no tatakai) was one of the crucial battles in Oda Nobunaga's campaigns to seize Iga province during Japan's Sengoku period. After a lengthy siege, and several successful sallies by the defenders, the castle eventually fell and was destroyed.

Gamō Ujisato, Tsutsui Junkei and Wakisaka Yasuharu commanded Nobunaga's forces, Gamō attacking the castle's neighboring towns near modern-day Ueno, Mie prefecture while Tsutsui approached from the west. The defensive force rose from those villages and gathered at the fortress, some preparing an ambush halfway up the hill. Gamō and Tsutsui launched their assault at night, pressing up the hill and meeting fierce resistance before being pushed back entirely by the ambush. The defenders threw rocks and even trees, and fired muskets from the castle.

Several nights later, the garrison launched a secret attack of their own on the enemy camp at Nagaokayama. Approaching from three directions, they lit torches upon a signal and closed in. Tsutsui's forces were alarmed and confused, and began firing arrows in every direction. Shortly, however, the torches were blown out by a fierce wind, and the battle was plunged into darkness. The garrison's warriors allegedly used passwords to help them determine friend from foe, while their foes killed many of their own in the confusion.

Despite this assault, the fortress was still under siege, badly outnumbered, and running out of food. When Gamō and Tsutsui attacked the fortress once more, they found the weather to be perfect for setting the entire complex ablaze. Wind from the mountains and dry weather combined to fan the flames and spread them across the wooden stockades, destroying the entire fortress, along with the nearby Hachiman Shintō shrine.
