= Iga Ueno Castle =

Castle in Iga, Mie Prefecture, Japan

Coordinates: 34°46′12″N 136°07′38″E

- 伊賀上野城
- Iga, Mie Prefecture, Japan
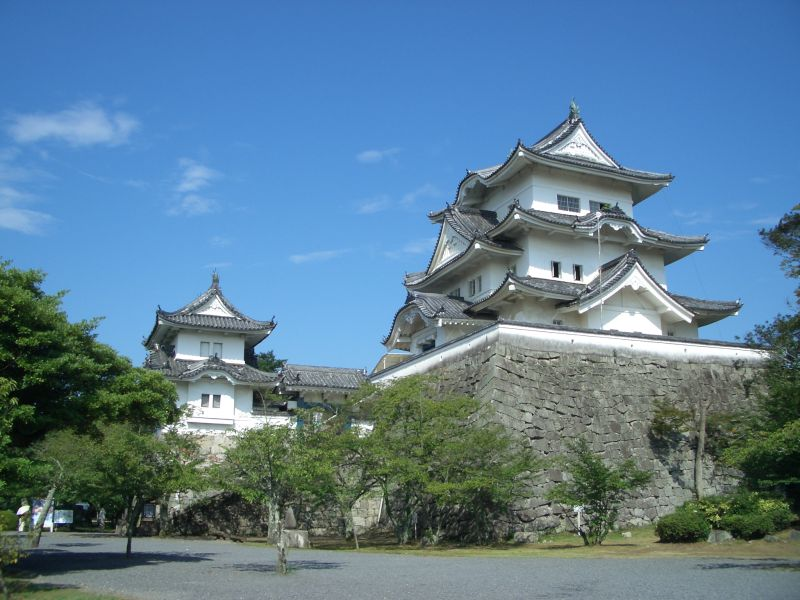
- Reconstructed tenshu of Iga Ueno Castle

Site information
- Type: hirayama-style Japanese castle
- Open to the public: yes (park)
- Condition: partially reconstructed

Location
- Iga Ueno Castle Iga Ueno Castle (Japan)

Site history
- Built: Edo period
- Built by: Tsutsui Sadatsugu / Tōdō Takatora
- In use: Edo period
- Demolished: 1871

Iga Ueno Castle (伊賀上野城, Iga-Ueno-jō), also known as Ueno Castle (上野城, Ueno-jō) is a Japanese castle located in the city of Iga, Mie Prefecture in the Kansai region of Japan. The castle is also called Hakuho Castle (白鳳城, Hakuhō-jō), or "White Phoenix Castle," because of its beautiful architecture and floor plan. The castle has been protected by the central government as a National Historic Site since 1967.

== Overview ==
Iga Ueno Castle is located on a hill at the northwestern corner of plateau formed by the Kizu River and Tsuge River, in the center of the city of Iga. The city itself is located in a mountainous basin on an important route connecting the ancient capital cities of Nara and Kyoto with the Ise Grand Shrine and provinces of eastern Japan. Iga Province was a small province separated from neighboring provinces on all sides by mountains. Inhabitants maintained autonomy from outside control through reliance on asymmetric warfare tactics, which later came to known as ninjutsu. From around the 1460s until their conquest by Oda Nobunaga in 1581, these warrior families, later known as ninja, self-governed the province as the Iga ikki, with a headquarters at the site of where the castle now stands.

== History ==
In 1581, Oda Nobunaga invaded and conquered Iga. Construction on Iga Ueno Castle began in 1585 by the command of Takigawa Katsutoshi. Under Toyotomi Hideyoshi, Tsutsui Sadatsugu (1562-1615), was transferred from Kōriyama Castle in Yamato Province to rule over Iga. He reconstructed the castle by dividing the hill into an upper eastern half and lower western half, with the upper portion forming the honmaru, or innermost bailey, with a three-story tenshu on its eastern edge.

Following the Battle of Sekigahara, Tokugawa Ieyasu expelled Tsutsui Sadatsugu from Iga Province for his pro-Toyotomi stance and installed his trusted general Tōdō Takatora to rule over Iga and the northern half of Ise Province. Tōdō also had a reputation for castle architecture and had previously built Uwajima Castle and Imabari Castle. At Iga Ueno, he renovated the honmaru, giving it 30 metres (98 feet) high walls. This meant that the walls of the honmaru of Iga Ueno Castle were the tallest of any castle in Japan. He also significantly expanded the castle area overall, with large kuruwa terraces of over 100 meters in length extending to the east and west. This gave the castle an overall size of 800 meters by 400 meters in total, with the new inner baily shifted to the western half of the hill. The site of the Tsutsui tenshu became the main residence, and a new five-story tenshu was in the process of being constructed when it was destroyed in a wind storm in 1612. However, after the Toyotomi clan was extinguished at the Siege of Osaka in 1615, the castle lost its importance and the tenshu (along with a planned series of water moats and stone walls) was never completed.

== Present situation ==
Following the Meiji restoration, all of the remaining structures of Iga Ueno Castle were destroyed.

In 1935, the tenshu was re-constructed out of wood. It houses a museum which holds a collection of artifacts relating to the area's history. Most other parts of the castle remain in ruins, though the towering honmaru walls still stand. The castle is preserved as Ueno Park. Iga Ueno Castle was listed as one of Japan's Top 100 Castles by the Japan Castle Foundation in 2006.

Parts of the Akira Kurosawa movie Kagemusha were filmed at Iga Ueno Castle.

Immediately alongside the castle is the Iga-ryū Ninja Museum which features a model village and a museum of ninja history and displays.

The castle is a 30-minute walk from Iga-Ueno Station on the JR West Kansai Main Line or a five-minute walk from Uenoshi Station on the Iga Railway.

== See also ==
- List of Historic Sites of Japan (Mie)
