= Tenshō Iga War =

Invasions of Iga province by forces under Oda Nobunaga

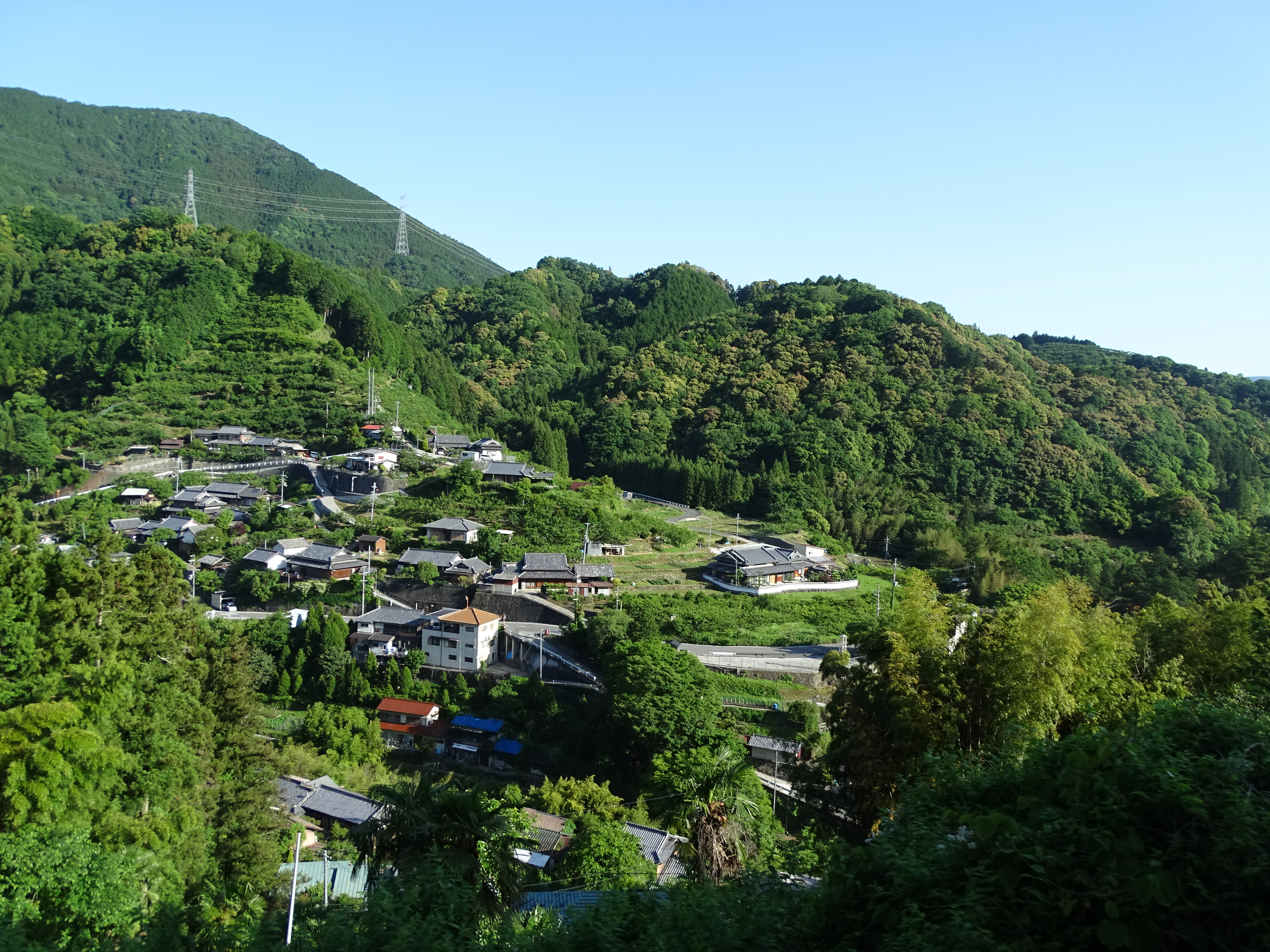
Mount Kōya. It was from here that the Rokkaku clan and its Kōka and Iga allies staged guerrilla war against Oda Nobunaga's armies.

Tenshō Iga War (天正伊賀の乱, Tenshō Iga no Ran) is the collective name for the conflicts between the Iga ikki and the Oda clan during the Sengoku period. The province was conquered by Oda Nobunaga in 1581 after an unsuccessful attempt in 1579 by his son Oda Nobukatsu. The third insurrection occurred in June 1582, after Oda Nobunaga's deaths during the Honnoji Incident.

The names of the wars are derived from the Tenshō era name (1573–1592) in which they occurred. Other names for the campaign include "The Attack on Iga" (伊賀攻め, Iga-zeme) or "Pacification of Iga" (伊賀平定, Iga Heitei).

== Background ==
Geographically, the Iga region was surrounded by mountains on all sides that could be passed through only via narrow pathways. This, plus the distance of the region from major transportation routes, meant that Iga was easily defendable by a relatively small number of men and was not a priority target for outside forces. The Niki clan had served as shugo of the province for the Ashikaga shogunate, but their control had never been strong and soon weakened further as the shōgun's authority diminished. No great warlord rose to take their place, although the Rokkaku to the north and the Kitabatake to the east extended their influence over parts of the province. Instead, as also happened in some neighboring areas, the province came to be controlled by a league (ikki) of the numerous local warrior clans (jizamurai) which had formed to defend the area's independence from outside military forces. The earliest details of the league are unknown, but by the mid-16th century it had been formalized as an organization known as the "league of all the commons of Iga" (伊賀惣国一揆, Iga Sōkoku Ikki), or Iga ikki.

Following the Battle of Okehazama in 1560, Oda Nobunaga of Owari province began his rise as a prominent daimyō of central Japan, rapidly expanding his territory. In 1567 he began his invasion of Ise province, which was then largely under the control of the Kitabatake clan. He slowly caused the Kitabatake vassals to switch to his side, and forced Kitabatake Tomofusa, the head of the clan, to sue for peace following the Battle of Okawachi Castle in 1569. As part of the peace agreement, Tomofusa adopted Nobunaga's son Nobukatsu as his heir, ceding much of his authority to the Oda. In December 1576 Nobunaga and Nobukatsu assassinated most of the remaining Kitabatake leadership (the Mise Incident), cementing their control of Ise.

== First Tenshō Iga War (1579) ==
First Tenshō Iga War
- Part of the Sengoku period
Date	October 6–7, 1579
Location	Iga Province
Result	Iga victory

Belligerents
Forces of Oda clan	Iga ikki

Commanders and leaders
Oda Nobukatsu; Takigawa Kazumasu; Tsuge Saburō †; Nagano Sakyōnosuke	Tanba Momochi; Ueda Mitsutsugu

Strength
10,800	Unknown

Casualties and losses
Thousands	Unknown

The young Nobukatsu, who now had control over Ise, decided to expand his domain to include Iga as well. In March 1578, Kai Shimoyama, a former minor Kitabatake vassal from Iga, visited Nobukatsu at his residence in Matsugashima and urged him to invade Iga, listing misdeeds being committed there. These included the expulsion of Niki Yubai, the nominal shugo of Iga, in June of the previous year. Tempted at the possibility of adding Iga to his domain, Nobukatsu dispatched Takigawa Kazumasu to build a castle at Maruyama in Iga to serve as a staging point for the campaign.

Alerted of Nobukatsu's intentions by the construction of the castle, warriors from Iga decided to attack before it had been completed. They attacked Maruyama Castle in broad daylight on November 24, 1578. Taken completely by surprise, Takigawa was forced to withdraw from the castle, which the Iga forces then burned. He reassembled the remnants of his forces at nearby Tsuzumigamine but was again defeated and retreated back to Ise.

Embarrassed and angered by this setback, Nobukatsu wanted to immediately attack Iga but was persuaded to wait by his advisors. Still determined to attack a year later, he formulated a three-pronged invasion the following year and departed Matsugashima on October 6, 1579. The Iga forces soon learned of Nobukatsu's preparations, however, and made plans to meet him. Nobukatsu and his main force of 8,000 men entered Iga through Nagano Pass the following day, but were ambushed as they did so. The waiting Iga troops made heavy use of their knowledge of the terrain and guerrilla tactics to surprise and confuse Nobukatsu's army. He retreated, taking heavy losses as his army became disorganized. The two other, smaller forces (1,500 men led by Tsuge Saburō through Onikobu Pass and 1,300 men led by Nagano Sakyōnosuke through Aoyama Pass) met similar fates, with Tsuge losing his life. According to the Iranki, Nobukatsu's losses numbered in the thousands. Momochi Tanba was among the Iga warriors who ambushed Saburō.

The campaign was thus a disaster; not only was Nobukatsu defeated, he had also lost one of his generals. Moreover, Nobukatsu had not consulted with Nobunaga prior to launching his attack. Nobukatsu's attack had been partly motivated by a desire to prove his merit to his father. Instead, Nobunaga was furious when he learned of Nobukatsu actions and threatened to disown him.

== Second Tenshō Iga War (1581) ==
Second Tenshō Iga War
- Part of the Sengoku period
Date	September 30-October 8, 1581
Location	Iga Province
Result	Oda victory
Territorial changes	Iga Province brought under Oda Nobukatsu's control

Belligerents
Forces of Oda Nobunaga	Iga ikki

Commanders and leaders
Oda Nobunaga; Oda Nobukatsu; Niwa Nagahide; Takigawa Kazumasu; Tsuda Nobusumi; Gamō Ujisato; Wakisaka Yasuharu; Asano Nagamasa; Tsutsui Junkei; Hori Hidemasa	Takino Jurobei Tanba Momochi; Ueda Mitsutsugu; Takino Yoshimasa; Machii Kiyobei; Morita Jōun; Fujibayashi Nagato-no-kami

Strength
42,000	10,000 or less

On September 30, 1581, Nobunaga launched his own invasion of Iga on a much larger scale. The immediate trigger for this second invasion was a visit by two residents of Iga to Nobunaga's stronghold in Azuchi a month before, during which the men offered to serve as guides for an invasion of the province. Nobunaga agreed and rewarded the men.

By this time Oda Nobunaga was at the height of his power. He controlled most of central Japan, including all of the territories that bordered Iga. He was therefore able to assemble a large army which attacked the province from all directions:

- 12,000 men under Niwa Nagahide and Takigawa Kazumasu entering from Tsuge to the northeast.
- 10,000 men under the command of Oda Nobukatsu and Tsuda Nobusumi entering from Ise (Aoyama Pass) to the southeast.
- 7,000 men under Gamō Ujisato and Wakisaka Yasuharu entering from Tamataki to the north.
- 7,000 men under Asano Nagamasa entering from Hase to the southwest.
- 3,700 men under Tsutsui Junkei entering from Kasama to the southwest.
- 2,300 men under Hori Hidemasa entering from Tarao to the northwest.

Against this large army of 42,000 men, the Iga defenders only totaled 10,000 at most, and these were spread throughout the province. The Oda forces advanced, torching castles, shrines, and temples, and meeting relatively little resistance. The most significant military actions were the siege of Hijiyama Castle, which had become the rallying point for the northern Iga forces, and the siege of Kashiwara Castle in the south. With the surrender of the forces in Kashiwara Castle on October 8, organized Iga resistance came to an end. During this conflict, a fortress belonging to Momochi Tanba was burned.

Oda Nobunaga himself toured the conquered province in early November 1581, and then withdrew his troops, placing control in Nobukatsu's hands. After capturing all the castles in Iga on the 11th, Nobukatsu spent time hunting down the remaining Iga forces.

== Third Tenshō Iga War (1582) ==
The Third Tensho Iga War
- Part of the Sengoku period
Date	June 1582 - April 1583
Location	Iga Province
Result	Oda victory

Belligerents
Forces of Oda Nobunaga	Iga ikki

Commanders and leaders
'Oda Nobukatsu; Ogawa Nagayasu; Takigawa Katsutoshi	

In June 1582, following the Honnō-ji Incident which resulted in Nobunaga being assassinated, the Iga clans rebelled again. Kitabatake Tomochika, who had been ousted during an uprising in Ise Province, fled to Iga. In response to this situation, Oda Nobukatsu ordered his vassal, Takigawa Katsutoshi, to pacify the rebellion. However, the rebellious Iga clan attacked Kashiwara Castle again, and the rebellion spread, sparking the Third Tensho Iga Rebellion.

The Iga forces barricaded themselves in Kashiwara Castle at Nabari District, Hijiyama Castle at Iga District, and also other castles such as the Miyata Castle, Shimabara Castle, and Amagoe Castle in Ahai. Many of Nobuyasu's vassals retreated from Iga except Ikejiri Heizaemon-no-jo, who stubbornly held down the castle from falling to the hàn Des of the rebels. In July, Nobuyasu further sent his other vassals, Takigawa Katsutoshi and Akiyama Ieyoshi, to subjugate rebellious Iga clans. However, they met stiff resistance, and he requested reinforcements, so Ogawa Nagayasu and others were dispatched. On August 6, the Iga forces launched a night attack, resulting in hand-to-hand combat and the defeat of the Nobuyasu forces.

In September, Nobukatsu's forces decided to attack Miyata Castle. They launched an all-out attack from four directions. Nagayasu, who was in charge of one of the directions, was repelled by the Iga forces under Honda Rokuemon and Taya Jinnojō. Meanwhile, the Nagata Castle which was being defended by Nobuyasu's army still struggling against night rains mounted by the Iga forces from Hijiyama Castle, so Nagayasu was asked to take over command of the defense. Nagayasu repelled the night attacks from Hijiyama Castle, causing the Iga forces to panic and retreat from the castle. On the other place, Katsutoshi advised Nobuyasu to immediately capture the Shimabara Castle with 1,400 soldiers, including reinforcements from Takigawa Kazumasu. However, their attempt to take the castle was repulsed by the Iga forced defenders. On September 27, Taira Saemon-no-jo and Ogawa Nagayasu instead received 3,000 reinforcements from Tsutsui Junkei from Yamato and captured Shimabara Castle in October. Later in November, Hirazaemon-no-jo suggested that Amagoi Castle would be easy to capture because it was a newly constructed castle, so Tsugawa Yukimitsu led an army to attack the castle. However, they failed to subdue the castle. Later, Hijikata Yukihisa sent an emissary with the order to retreat as Nobukatsu went to Kyoto. Ogawa Nagayasu and Tamaru Naotake served as rear guards and repelled the pursuing force led by Hattori Densuke.

Later in 1583, Nobukatsu issued a ruling stating that the Ahai District, which was already under Katsutoshi control, that he would defeat the rebel forces once the situation in the Kamigata region had settled. However, when the Battle of Shizugatake broke out that same year between Hashiba Hideyoshi and Shibata Katsuie, Nobukatsu sided with Hideyoshi. Shibata Katsuie, in a conflicting sense, contacted Yamanaka Nagatoshi, a member of the Kōka clan of Iga, to ally with the Iga clan and promote anti-Hideyoshi and Nobukatsu movements in Iga. Furthermore, Kitabatake Tomochika, who had rebelled against Nobukatsu in Ise the previous year, fled to Iga and allied with the Iga clan. Furthermore, Nobukatsu's vassals, the Akiyama and Sawa clans of Yamato, joined forces with Tomochika in a rebellion, further contributing to the unstable situation.

Seishū Gunki, a military chronicle and historical book of Ise Province (1635-1636), praised Katsutoshi for his fortitude in this third campaign in Iga. After conquering Iga Province, Katsutoshi was given control of Maruyama Castle as a reward.

== Impact ==
The espionage and guerrilla tactics developed by the Iga "militias of warrior-peasants" are believed to have formed the basis for the "ninja" tradition of the region. Following their defeat, forces from Iga were hired as auxiliary troops by other military forces.

== See also ==
- Mumon: The Land of Stealth
- Tenshō-Jingo war
