= Wakisaka Yasuharu =

16/17th-century Japanese warlord (daimyō) of Awaji Island

- 脇坂 安治
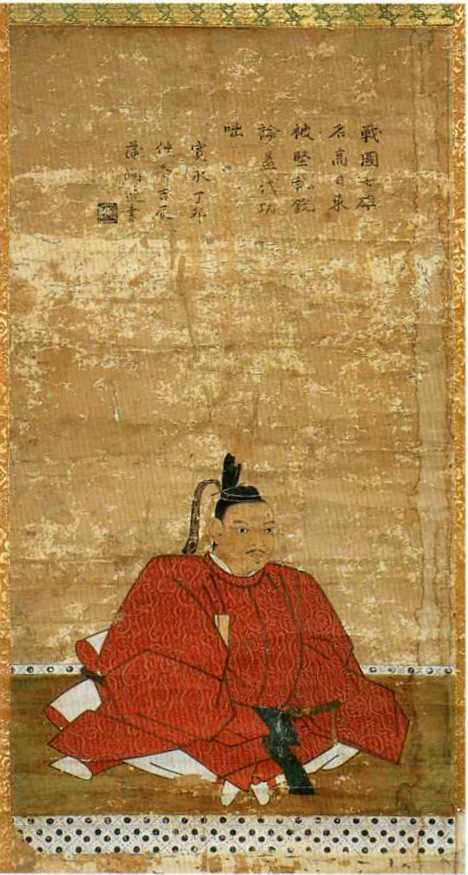

Lord of Awaji Island
- In office 1585–1626
- Succeeded by: Wakisaka Yasumoto

Personal details
- Born: 1554 Nagahama, Shiga, Japan
- Died: September 26, 1626 (aged 71–72)

Military service
- Allegiance: Azai clan Oda clan Akechi clan Toyotomi clan Western Army; Tokugawa shogunate
- Commands: Sumoto Castle
- Battles/wars: Tanba Campaign; Chugoku campaigns Siege of Miki; Tenshō Iga War; Siege of Hijiyama; Battle of Shizugatake; Kyūshū campaign Odawara campaign Korean campaign Battle of Sekigahara

Wakisaka Yasuharu (脇坂 安治; 1554 – September 26, 1626), sometimes referred to as Wakizaka Yasuharu, was a daimyō (feudal lord) of Awaji Island who fought under a number of warlords over the course of Japan's Sengoku period.

== Biography ==
Wakisaka originally served Azai Nagamasa but after Azai's downfall in 1573, he attended the Oda clan. As a yoriki of Akechi Mitsuhide a vassal of Oda Nobunaga. He distinguished himself during the assault on Kuroi Castle in 1578 at Tanba Province.

Later, he applied directly to Hashiba Hideyoshi to become his vassal. He later gained more success during Hideyoshi's Chugoku campaigns with assaults on Kanki Castle and Siege of Miki Castle in Harima Province.

In 1581, he took part on Tenshō Iga War; he was one of several generals who led Nobunaga's troops during the Siege of Hijiyama.

The following year In 1582, Akechi betrayed Oda Nobunaga and took his power and lands, but was defeated two weeks later at the Battle of Yamazaki. Wakisaka then joined the victor, Hashiba Hideyoshi, who had become a conspicuous figure as a retainer of Oda Nobunaga.

Following the Battle of Shizugatake in 1583, Wakisaka came to be known as one of the shichi-hon-yari (七本槍), or Seven Spears of Shizugatake. These seven would be among Hideyoshi's most trusted generals, especially in naval combat. Wakisaka was granted the fief of Awaji Island, worth 30,000 koku, in 1585.

He was then made commander of part of Hideyoshi's fleet, taking part in Hideyoshi's 1587 campaigns in Kyushu, the 1590 Siege of Odawara, and the invasions of Korea, which took place from 1592 to 1598.

== Korean campaign ==
In 1592, Wakisaka led 1,500 soldiers and landed on the Korean peninsula. He was defeated by Admiral Yi Sun-shin at the Battle of Hansando and lost most of his fleet. Barely surviving the battle, he hid on a nearby uninhabited island and lived by eating seaweed until the enemy withdrew. He participated in both ground and naval actions in various places on the Korean peninsula.

He was also ordered to dispatch a 1,200-man fleet during the Keichō Invasion and annihilated a Korean fleet counterattack his position which was led by Wŏn Kyun during a Battle of Chilcheollyang in July 1597. Despite his actions, he was unable to counter Admiral Yi Sun-shin, whose naval activities effectively cut off Japanese naval supply lines to the Korean Peninsula; despite this failure and the ultimate defeat of the Japanese forces during the campaigns, Wakisaka's reward for participating in this war was an increase in territory to 3,000 koku.

== Battle of Sekigahara ==
In 1600, Wakisaka was going to side with Tokugawa Ieyasu. At this moment, Wakisaka Yasuharu sent his second son, Yasumoto, to march down to Kanto to join the Tokugawa forces punishing Uesugi Kagekatsu. However, Yasumoto was intercepted by Mitsunari, who had raised an army against Ieyasu, and was forced to return to Osaka from Omi. Yasumoto then sent a letter to Yamaoka Kagetomo, who was accompanying Ieyasu, explaining the situation and conveying his intention to side with Ieyasu. Ieyasu then sent a letter to Yasumoto expressing his gratitude for Yasumoto's loyalty to Ieyasu.

He later was compelled to oppose him, siding with Ishida Mitsunari, who had raised Wakisaka's army when he stayed in Osaka.

On October 21, during the decisive Battle of Sekigahara, Wakisaka switched sides along with Kobayakawa Hideaki, he defeated Ōtani Yoshitsugu's force, and contributed to the Tokugawa victory.

After the battle, Tokugawa allowed Wakisaka to continue governing his domain of Awaji. In succeeding years, he was given another fief, at Ōzu, Iyo Province, worth 53,000 koku. His son, Wakisaka Yasumoto, succeeded to the house after his death.

== Popular culture ==
- Portrayed by Kim Myung-soo in the 2004–2005 KBS1 TV series Immortal Admiral Yi Sun-sin
- Portrayed by Cho Jin-woong in the 2014 film The Admiral: Roaring Currents
- Portrayed by Byun Yo-han in the 2022 film Hansan: Rising Dragon
