= Tsutsui Junkei =

Japanese Daimyo (1549–1584)

- 筒井 順慶
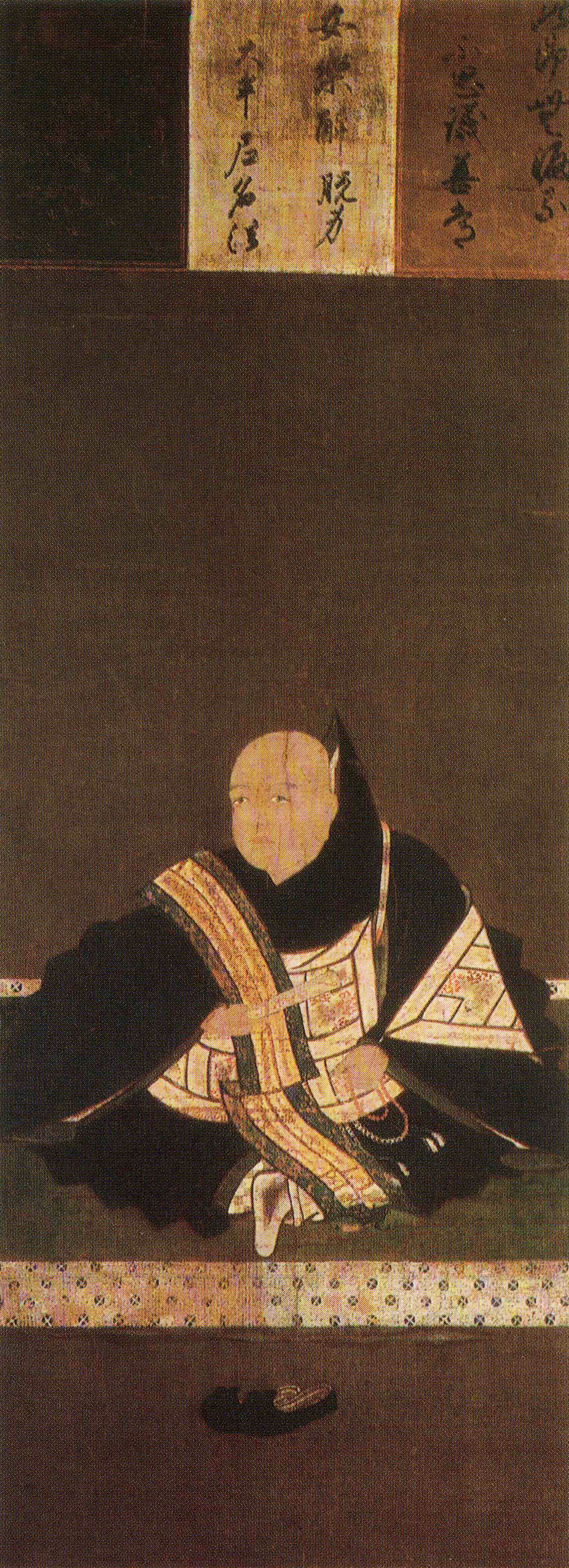

Head of Tsutsui clan
- In office 1550–1584
- Preceded by: Tsutsui Junshō
- Succeeded by: Tsutsui Sadatsugu

Daimyo of Yamato Province
- In office 1578–1584
- Preceded by: Matsunaga Danjo Hisahide
- Succeeded by: Toyotomi Hidenaga

Personal details
- Born: March 31, 1549 Yamato Province
- Died: September 15, 1584 (aged 35) Yamato Province
- Children: Tsutsui Sadatsugu; Tsutsui Junsai
- Parent: Tsutsui Junshō (father)

Military service
- Allegiance: Oda clan Toyotomi clan
- Commands: Kōriyama Castle
- Battles/wars: Echizen Campaign (1575); Siege of Shigisan (1577); Siege of Itami (1579); Siege of Hijiyama (1581); Battle of Komaki and Nagakute (1584)

Tsutsui Junkei (筒井 順慶; March 31, 1549 – September 15, 1584) son of Tsutsui Junshō, and a daimyō of the province of Yamato. On 1571, Junkei, through the offices of Akechi Mitsuhide, pledged to service of Oda Nobunaga.

== Military life ==
Early in his career, in 1565, Matsunaga Hisahide, one of the most powerful warriors of the region, defeated Junkei and took Tsutsui Castle, but one year later in 1566, Junkei's Tsutsui castle was reclaimed after the battle against Hisahide, but shortly afterward he had to abandon it, following an order by Nobunaga.

In 1575, he joined the attack against the Echizen Ikkō-ikki, he participated in a unit among the forces from Yamato led by Harada Naomasa.

In 1577, by joining the forces of Oda Nobutada, along with Akechi Mitsuhide and Hosokawa Fujitaka, Junkei defeated Hisahide in Siege of Shigisan at Mount Shigi.

In 1578, He was then appointed to the position of daimyō over Yamato, and was allowed to build a new castle, which was called Kōriyama Castle, now in Yamatokōriyama, Nara.

He participated in the Siege of Itami (1579) against Araki Murashige and Tenshō Iga War in the Siege of Hijiyama in (1581) against forces of Iga Sōkoku Ikki.

In 1582, during the Battle of Yamazaki, Junkei refused to take either side and remained neutral awaiting the results of the battle at "Hora ga toge". This is the origin of the expression, "To sit on Hora ga toge", when referring to indecision.

In 1584, Junkei fought in the Komaki Campaign against Tokugawa Ieyasu and after battle, his governance over Yamato was guaranteed by Toyotomi Hideyoshi.

== Death ==
Later on September 15, 1584, he died of illness. After Junkei's death, the Tsutsui clan was succeeded by Tsutsui Sadatsugu, a cousin and adopted son of Junkei. The Tsutsui Clan subsequently lost governance of Yamato to Toyotomi Hidenaga, Hideyoshi's half-brother. Sadatsugu themselves were moved to the Iga Province by orders of Hideyoshi.
