= Tsutsui Junshō =

Sengoku period Japanese warlord

- 筒井 順昭

Head of Tsutsui clan
- Preceded by: Tsutsui Junkō
- Succeeded by: Tsutsui Junkei

Personal details
- Born: March 2, 1523
- Died: August 2, 1550
- Children: Tsutsui Junkei

Military service
- Commands: Kōriyama Castle

Tsutsui Junshō (筒井 順昭, March 2, 1523 – August 2, 1550) was a warlord of the Japanese province of Yamato during the Sengoku period of the 16th century. Junshō was the son of Tsutsui Junkō. In the Sengoku Period, Junshō ascended to the position of daimyō over the province of Yamato.

Junshō's death was kept secret for three years. A blind monk from Nara named Mokuami, whose physical appearance resembled Junshō, was used as a stand-in to conceal his death. Junshō's son Tsutsui Junkei took his father's position after he grew up and Mokuami was sent back to Nara as an ordinary priest.
