= Tsutsui Station =

Tsutsui Station may refer to:

- Tsutsui Station (Aomori), a railway station in Aomori Prefecture, Japan
- Tsutsui Station (Nara), a railway station in Nara Prefecture, Japan
