= Tsutsui clan =

Japanese clan

- The emblem (mon) of the Tsutsui clan
- Home province: Yamato
- Parent house: Fujiwara clan
- Founding year: 16th century

Tsutsui clan (筒井氏, Tsutsui-shi) is a Japanese clan originating during the Sengoku period (16th century) of Japan. Throughout the time of the 16th century, the Tsutsui clan would mainly control the Yamato Province, due to the efforts of the feudal lord (daimyō) Tsutsui Junkei. The Tsutsui soon on became a retainer family under that of the Oda clan, resulting in a minor rise within their power. After Junkei had been killed during a certain battle against Oda Nobuo, the power of the Tsutsui fell away to a high extent. The Tsutsui families past is unknown past this point.

The Tsutsui are most well known for a samurai under their service named Shima Sakon, though he later became a rōnin.

== Heads and members of the clan ==
- Tsutsui Junko
- Tsutsui Junshō
- Tsutsui Junkei
- Tsutsui Junsai
- Tsutsui Sadatsugu
- Tsutsui Juntei
