= Kōriyama Castle =

Castle in Yamatokōriyama, Nara, Japan

- 郡山城
- Yamatokōriyama, Nara Japan
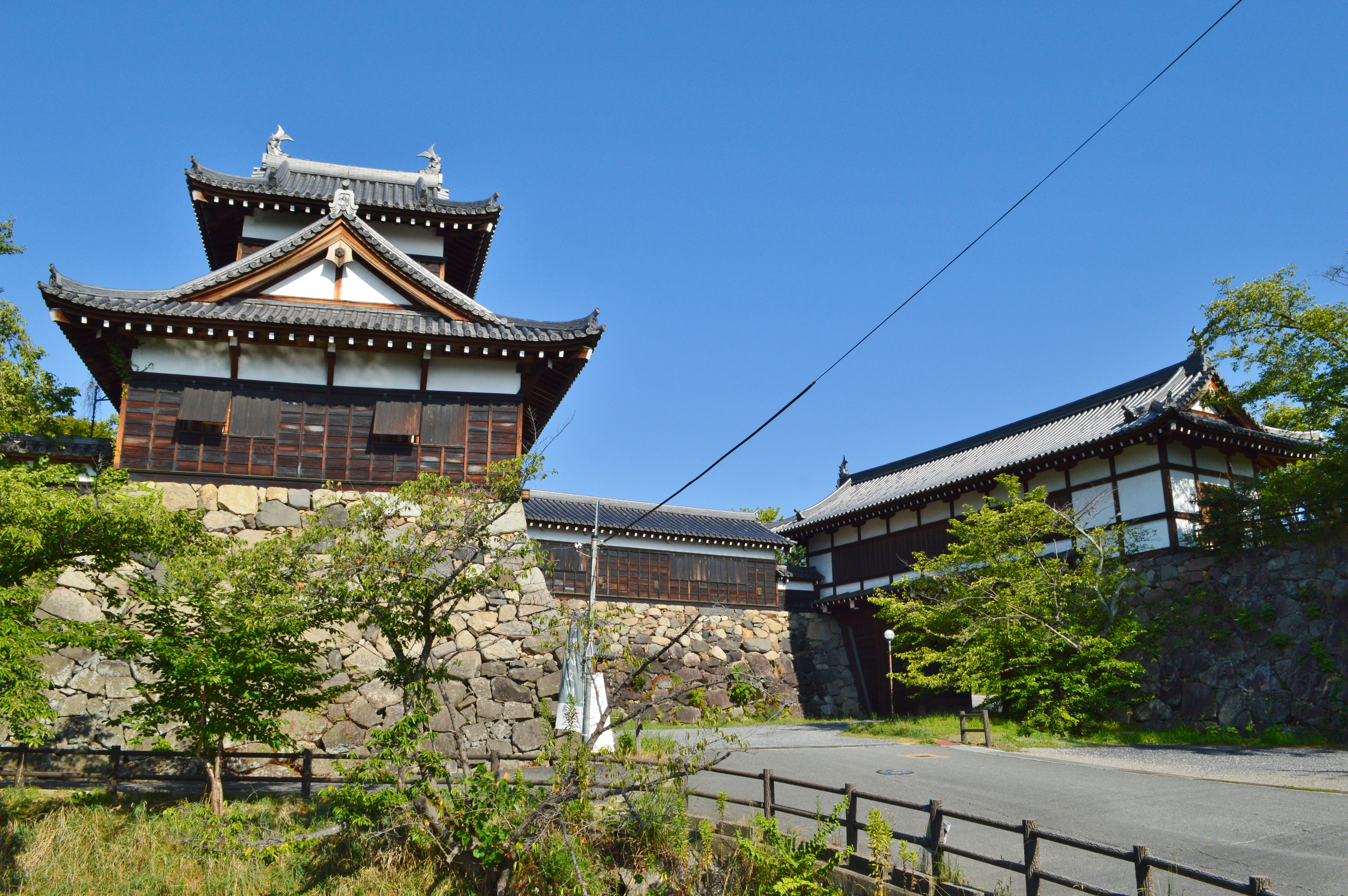
- Kōriyama Castle

Site information
- Type: Japanese castle
- Controlled by: Yanagisawa clan
- Open to the public: yes
- Condition: Archaeological and designated national historical site; castle ruins

Location
- Location within Nara Prefecture Location within Japan
- Coordinates: 34°39′6.9″N 135°46′44.18″E

Site history
- Built: 1602-1606
- Built by: Toyotomi Hidenaga
- In use: Edo period
- National Historic Site of Japan

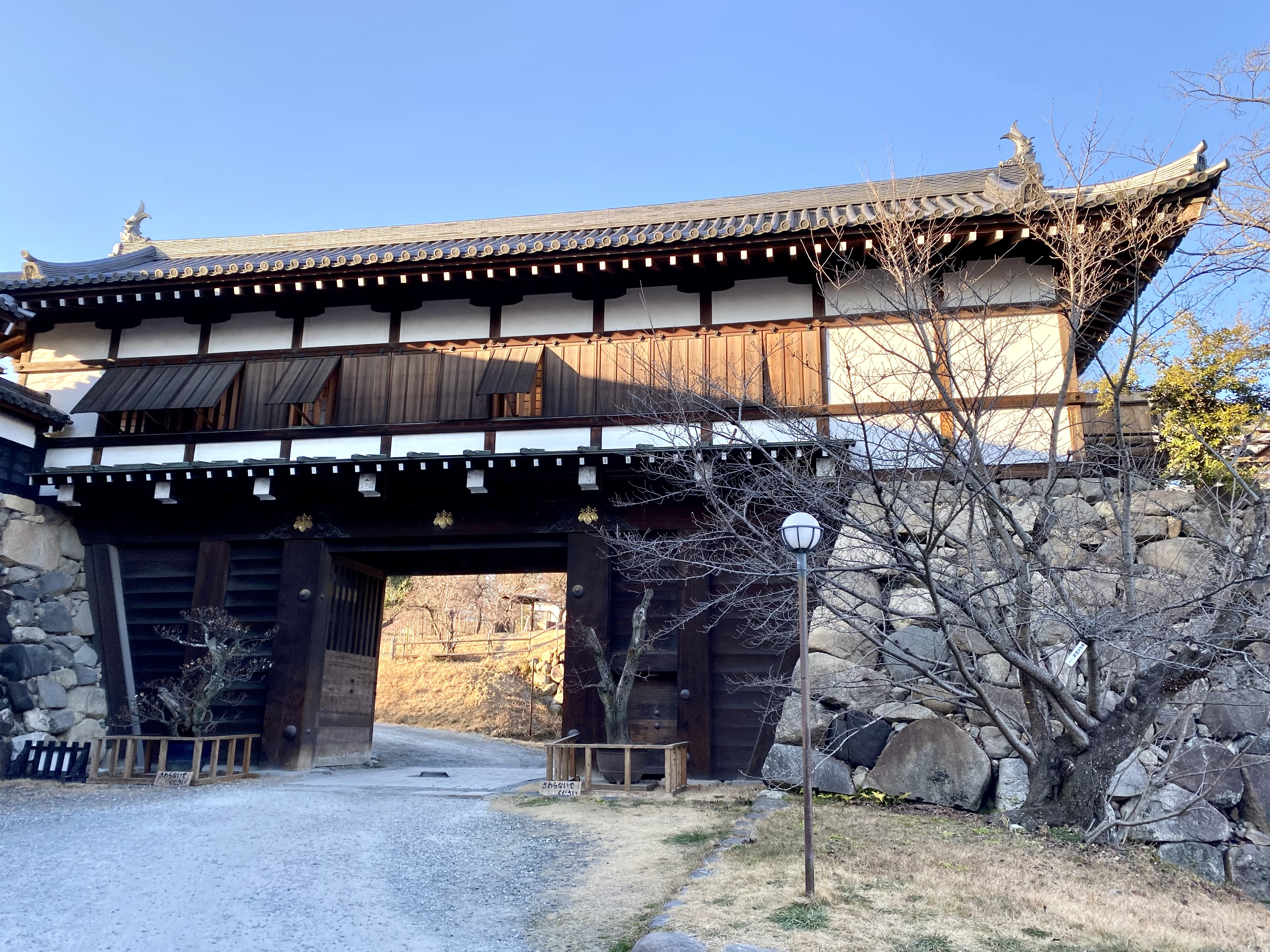
reconstructed Ote-mon

Kōriyama Castle (郡山城, Kōriyama-jō) is a flatlands-style Japanese castle located in the city of Yamatokōriyama, Nara Prefecture, Japan. Its ruins have been protected as a National Historic Site since 2023. It is No.194 on the list "Continued 100 Fine Castles of Japan".

== Overview ==
Kōriyama Castle is located at the center of the Nara Basin on the southern end of the Saikyo Hills, on a peninsula protected by the Akishino and Tomio Rivers. The site appears to have been a physic garden in the Nara period, and the first record of a fortification dates from the late 10th century. During the Sengoku period, it was extensively remodeled by Tsutsui Junkei (1549-1584), a local petty warlord who had previously been a general commanding the sōhei (armed monks) of Kofuku-ji. The clan controlled central Yamato Province, but were defeated by Matsunaga Hisahide. Kōriyama Castle was taken by Matsunaga Hisahide, but was soon recovered by Tsutsui Junkei. After Matsunaga Hisahide failed rebellion against Oda Nobunaga, Tsutsui Junkei was awarded all of Yamato Province. Oda Nobunaga ordered him to consolidate his castles, and he selected Koriyama as his stronghold. Following the assassination of Nobunaga in 1582, Tsutsui remained neutral in Toyotomi Hideyoshi's battle against Akechi Mitsuhide, and was awarded with confirmation in his existing territory. However, after Tsutsui Junkei's death, his successor was transferred to Iga Province in 1585 and Kōriyama was awarded to Hideyoshi's younger brother, Toyotomi Hidenaga. Hidenaga significantly expanded Kōriyama Castle to have the prestige suitable for the brother of Hideyoshi, and the shape of the current castle was completed at this time.

The basic layout was like a whirlpool, with secondary and outer enclosures surrounding the central bailey, which had a tenshu constructed in its northwest corner and the main gate at the southeast edge. Since Yamato lacked high-quality stone, each household in the area was required to provide 20 loads of stones. Stone Buddhist statues, gravestones, and stone pagodas from temples were robbed to provide building materials. Among the stones used were foundation stones the Rajōmon of Heijō-kyō, and stone Buddhas from the "Zōtō", a pyramidical Buddhist ruin from around the 8th century in Nara city.

After Hidenaga's death, Kōriyama Castle was given to Nagamori Mashita (1545-1615), one of five magistrates of Toyotomi government. Under his tenure, the castle town was improved and protected by water moats. During the 1600 Battle of Sekigahara, he supported the Western Army of Ishida Mitsunari and was thus deposed by Tokugawa Ieyasu. Many of the defensive structures of the castle were destroyed by order of the new Tokugawa shogunate. After the 1614-1615 Siege of Osaka, Kōriyama was made the center of Kōriyama Domain, which was ruled by a succession of fudai daimyō houses such as the Mizuno clan, Okudaira Matsudaira clan, and Honda clan, and the castle structures were reconstructed. In 1724, Yanagisawa Yoshisato, the son of Shōgun Tokugawa Tsunayoshi's advisor and confidant Yanagisawa Yoshiyasu was transferred from Kōfu Castle to Koriyama. His descendants would continue to rule Koriyama until the Meiji restoration.

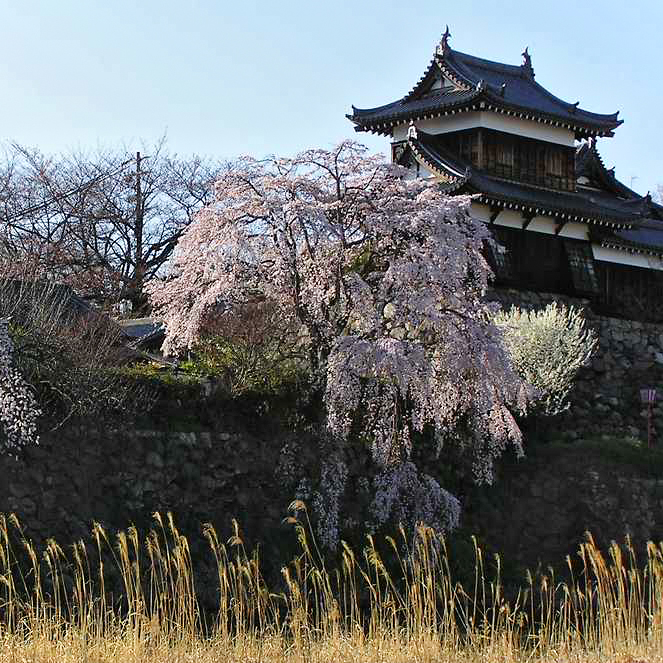
reconstructed Yagura

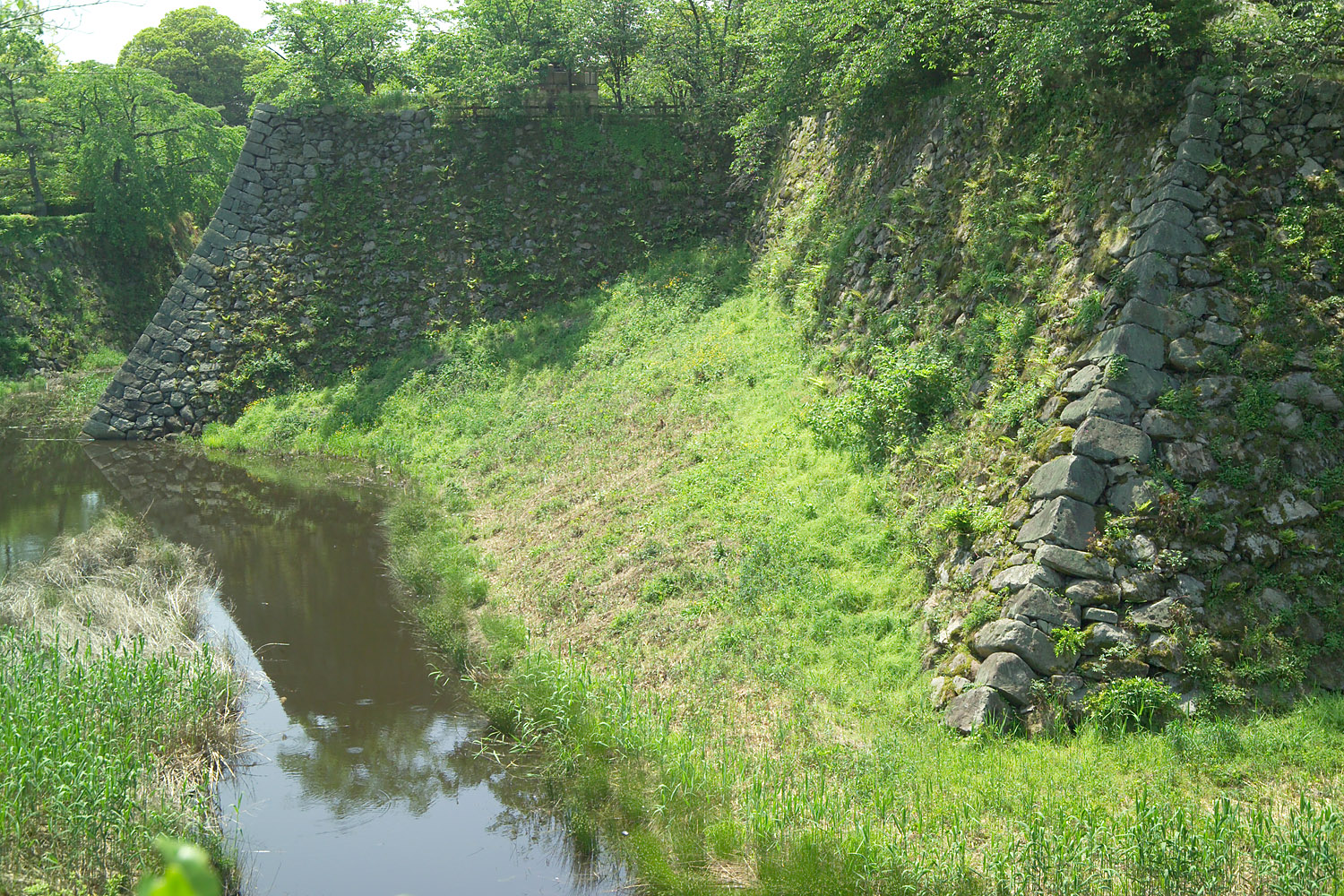
Wall and moat

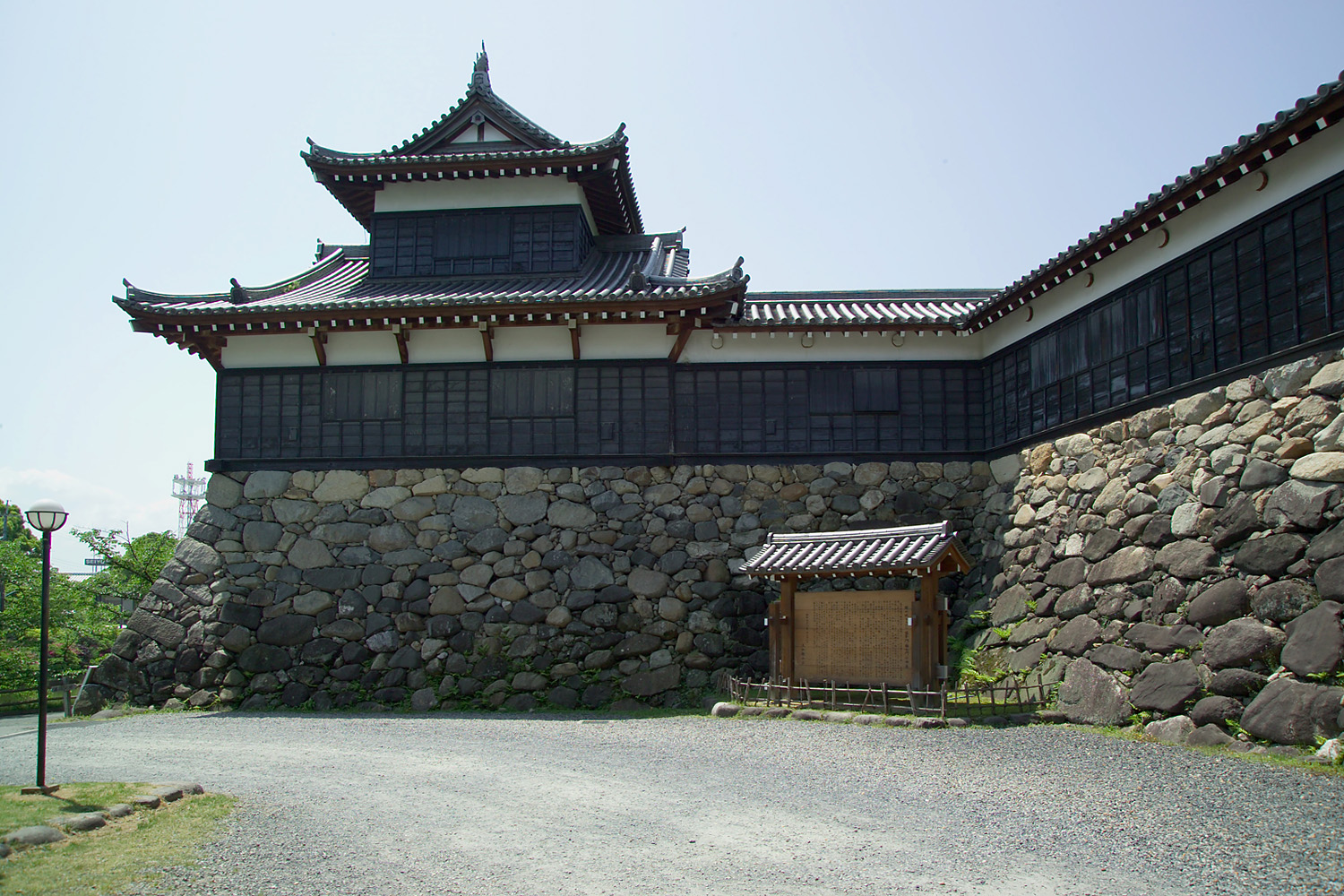
Turret atop a stone wall

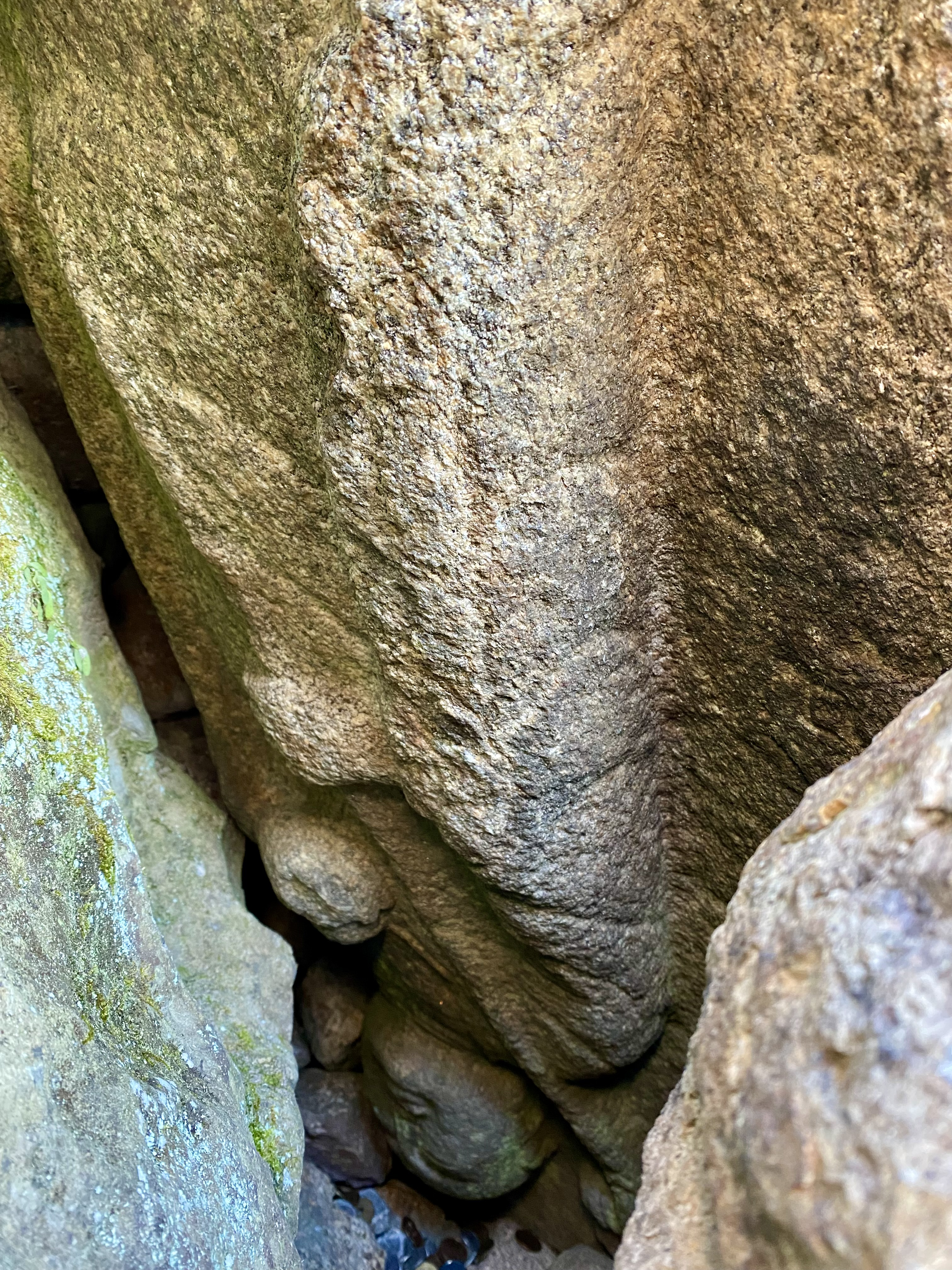
upside down Buddhist statue in the walls

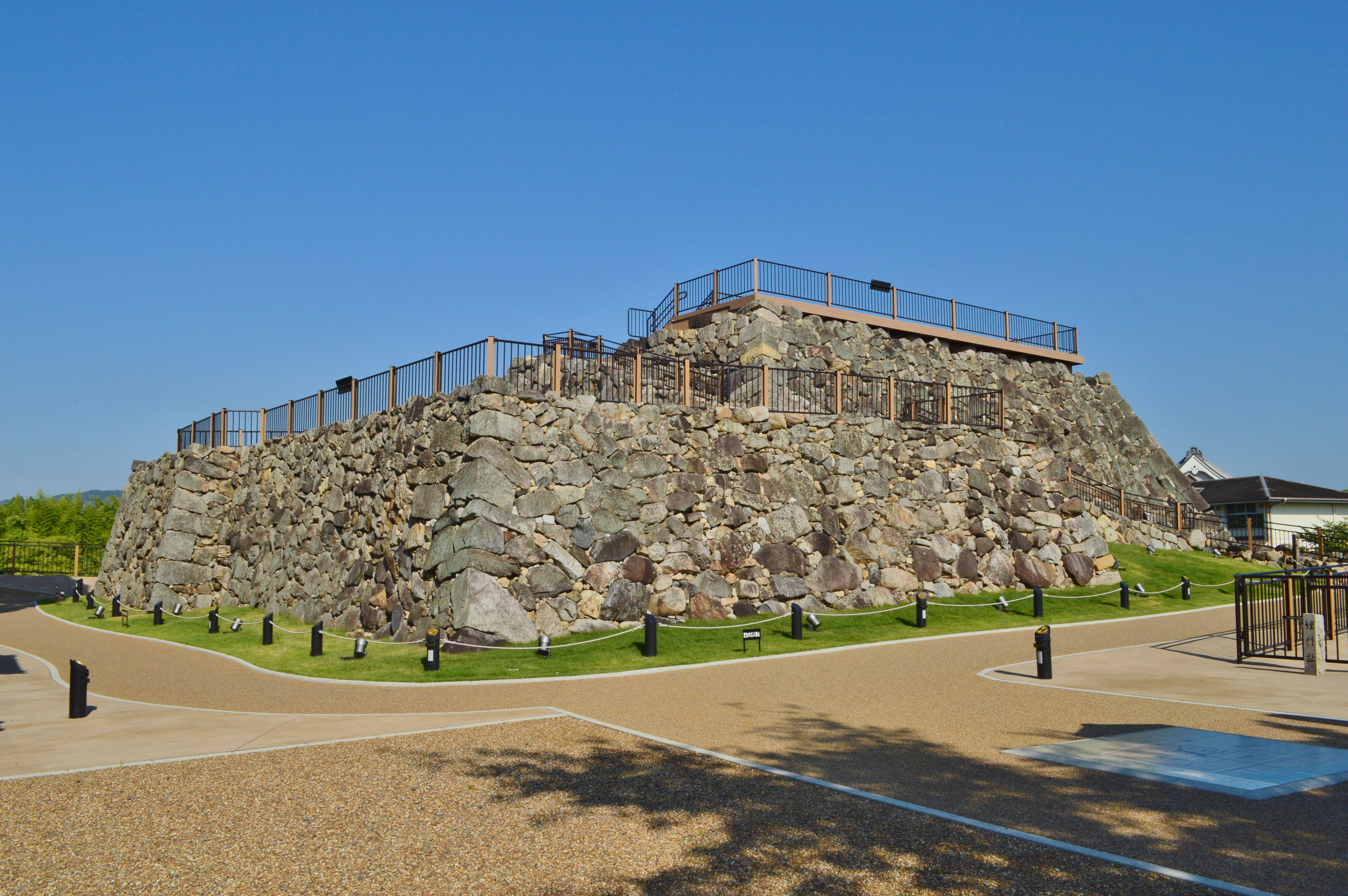
Foundation of the tenshu

== Current situation ==
Following the Meiji restoration, all buildings of the castle except for one gate were either destroyed or transferred to neighboring temples. The outer enclosure areas became schools, and a shinto shrine to the Yanagisawa clan was erected in the central bailey. The tall stone walls and deep moat around central bailey and secondary area are well-preserved, and the outer water moat partially survives in the form of discontinuous ponds around the castle. The Ote-mon Gate was reconstructed in 1983, the Ote-higashi-sumi-yagura in 1984, and the Ote-muki-yagura in 1987 with donations from citizens. An archaeological excavation from 2013 to 2017 confirmed the foundations of the tenshu and that this structure existed during the time of Toyomi Hidenaga. According to popular legend, the tenshu was destroyed in the 1596 Keichō–Fushimi earthquake due to a curse caused by some of its foundation stones being Buddhist statues which had been blasphemously installed upside-down; however, per contemporary documents it was dismantled and relocated to Nijō Castle and then to Yōdō Castle. A survey and construction project was carried out from 2013 to 2017, and the foundation stones were confirmed. This survey confirmed that a castle tower definitely existed during the time of Toyotomi Hidenaga.

Kōriyama Castle was listed as one of the Continued Top 100 Japanese Castles in 2017. In 2022, it was also designated a National Historic Site. The cherry trees planted when Yanagisawa Shrine was founded have been selected as one of the "100 Best Cherry Blossom Spots in Japan", and the "Castle Festival" held every year from April 1 attracts many visitors.

The castle is a 15 minute walk from Kintetsu Koriyama Station on the Kintetsu Railway Kashihara Line.

== See also ==
- List of Historic Sites of Japan (Nara)

== Literature ==
- Benesch, Oleg and Ran Zwigenberg (2019). Japan's Castles: Citadels of Modernity in War and Peace. Cambridge: Cambridge University Press. p. 374. ISBN 9781108481946.
- De Lange, William (2021). An Encyclopedia of Japanese Castles. Groningen: Toyo Press. pp. 600 pages. ISBN 978-9492722300.
