= Tsutsui Sadatsugu =

Japanese clan leader (1562–1615)

- 筒井 順慶
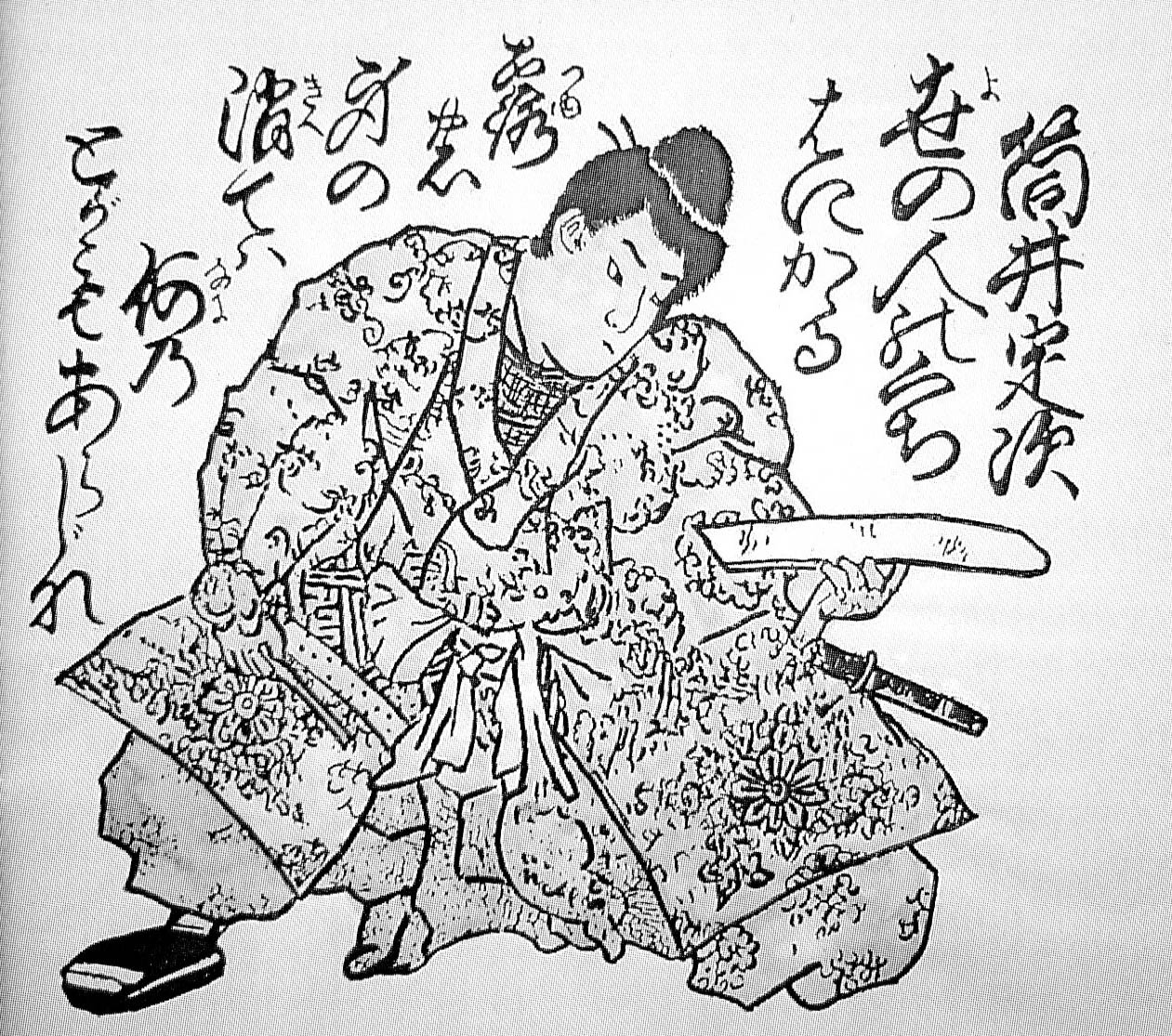

Head of Tsutsui clan
- In office 1584–1615
- Preceded by: Tsutsui Junkei
- Succeeded by: Tsutsui Juntei

Personal details
- Born: June 6, 1562
- Died: April 2, 1615 (aged 52)
- Parent: Tsutsui Junkei (father)

Military service
- Allegiance: Toyotomi clan Eastern Army; Tokugawa shogunate
- Commands: Iga Ueno Castle
- Battles/wars: Invasion of Shikoku (1585); Battle of Sekigahara (1600); Siege of Osaka (1615)

Tsutsui Sadatsugu (筒井 定次; June 6, 1562 – April 2, 1615) was a cousin and adopted son of Tsutsui Junkei, a feudal lord of the Yamato province. At the death of Junkei in 1584, he was relocated by Toyotomi Hideyoshi to Iga Province, where he built the Iga Ueno Castle.

In 1585, he participated at Hideyoshi Invasion of Shikoku against Chōsokabe clan.

In 1600, he took sides with the Tokugawa Ieyasu Eastern army in the Battle of Sekigahara.

In 1608, however, he was removed from his position by the Tokugawa shogunate, in an accusation of sloppy governance. In addition, the Tsutsui clan was forcefully abolished. The castle of Iga Ueno was accordingly taken over by Tōdō Takatora. The initial pretext of Sadatsugu's domain confiscation was because Sadatsugu's sloppy governance of the domain. However, historians arguing that the reason were because Sadatsugu behaved suspiciously visiting Toyotomi Hideyori at Osaka Castle, without the Shogunate approval, while the land which Sadatsugu occupied was considered as important military strategic location. Furthermore, it was more though that in Ieyasu perspective to strip the land and give it to the Todo clan as political strategy against the Toyotomi clan, as despite his patronage to the Toyotomi family, Tōdō Takatora were considered as a close ally of Ieyasu. Thus by making him to control the portions of Iga province, it could pushed more strategic locations to the influence of Shogunate without directly provoking the Toyotomi faction in Osaka.

In 1615, Sadatsugu was ordered by the Shogunate to commit suicide on charge of his secret communication with the people of Osaka Castle during Winter Siege of Osaka. However, his son, Tsutsui Juntei was killed in action during Summer Siege of Osaka. Later, the Tsutsui clan disappeared.

== Appendix ==
=== Bibliography ===
- 籔, 景三 (1985). 筒井順慶とその一族 [Junkei Tsutsui and his family] (in Japanese). 新人物往来社. pp. 213–4. ISBN 4-404-01281-0.
- Tatsuo, Fujita (2018). 藤堂高虎論 -初期藩政史の研究 [Todo Takatora Theory - Research on the history of early feudal government]. 塙書房. ISBN 978-4827312966.
- Tatsuo Fujita (2006). 江戸時代の設計者―異能の武将・藤堂高虎― [Architect of the Edo Period: Takatora Todo, a Warlord with Extraordinary Talents]. 講談社現代新書. 講談社. ISBN 4061498304.
