= Hajime Tsutsui =

Japanese artist and designer

Hajime Tsutsui 筒井 はじめ
- Born: December 7, 1970 (age 55); Tokyo, Japan
- Occupation: Artist
- Website: TSUTSUIHAJIME officialweb

Hajime Tsutsui (筒井 はじめ, Tsutsui Hajime) (born on December 7, 1970, in Tokyo) is a Japanese artist and designer. Currently, he works as a fashion designer for the design firms Tsusuihajime×Hyouzaemon, Tsutsui Hajime×L'Homos, and Ninita.

== Life and career ==
In spring 2003, Hajime completed his first piece of art. It was not the start of his professional career as an artist, it was more of the inception of what was to come. At the time, he was running a restaurant as well as an art exhibition gallery in Setagaya, Tokyo.

One day, while taking a break, Hajime was watching a photo shoot for SEDA fashion magazine in his restaurant. There was a large canvas (160x1620) that was not being used at the time. Without any intention, Hajime started drawing flourishing flowers all over the canvas.

Hajime has many pieces of his art in the exhibition room at his restaurant, Tokai no Mori Garden. Two well-known people at the photo shoot, Tomoyo Nishiwaki, a respected fashion stylist, and Masashi Tateno, a master hair stylist in Japan, were very impressed with Hajime's painting and creative process, and complimented his talent.

=== Textile and fashion design ===
he then went to visit various locations for the latest fashion and design scenes in Japan. In 2003, he signed a contract with Nishiwaki's fashion company, Ninita, as a textile designer. His clothing designs were loved by many popular Japanese actresses; Aoi Miyazaki, Masami Nagasawa, Kyoko Fukada and Satomi Ishihara have worn his designs.

In spring 2004, Hajime met Taichi Saotome, who was 13 years old at that time. Taichi is a Japanese film and stage actor best known for playing beautiful young men and women. Hajime started to design a kimono for him. In winter 2007, Hajime designed a kimono for Taichi for his first appearance on the NHK Kōhaku Uta Gassen, a prestigious live music show on TV, broadcast every year on December 31 since 1953. In that year, he resigned his position as designer in Ninita. He left many items with floral designs, which was one of his favorite motifs.

During 2009, Hajime started working in fashion design again. He had a contract with Fujibo Holdings Inc as a fashion designer. His design sold in the Tsutsui Hajime×L'Homos line.

=== Film and television ===
Before his contract with Ninita, he won several prizes for his paintings and pictures. He was also involved in some art works such as media-art works for Yukio Funai, poster designs for performances and arts. He became acquainted with respected actors and artists in Japan, such as Nao Omori, Hiroshi Tamaki, Takeru Amano (artist), Kyoko Inukai (writer) and Mika Omori (movie director), and gave some artistic ideas to those artists, yet he did not recognize himself as an artist at that time. In 2004, he appeared in a movie titled 2 banme no kanojyo ("Second Girlfriend"), directed by Mika Omori.

Itsurou Yoshimi PhD (researcher) told him about the Mexican myth of the purple shell. Hajime went to Mexico where he had an opportunity to shoot photographs of the Misuteka wedding, a native Mexican family who had lived in Oaxaca since the 9th or 10th century. Hajime created his first movie about this Mexican myth and wedding, shot as a documentary titled Myth of the Purple Shell.

The photograph of this Mexico visit received a Japan Post DM Award in 2006. This prize and his first movie led to his involvement in activities as a film director. In 2007, he established his official YouTube channel "Cameracamenfilms", which in January 2011, had 200 original movie files and counts of more than 100 million views. Besides working as a director, he had a talk show on TV with Taichi Saotome and Aya Mizusawa in spring 2008, though he barely spoke, even though he was one of the hosts.

=== Japanese traditional design works ===
Originally, Hajime had many interests in Japanese traditional art work. In spring 2009, he had a collaboration project with Hyozaemon, Co. Ltd., a traditional chopstick company established about one hundred years ago.

He developed an exclusive line of chopsticks called Tsutsuihajime×Hyozaemon. They attracted massive attention, and created a phenomenon called "My hashi boom" (hashi means chopsticks in Japanese) in the Japanese industry. TsutsuihajimexHyozaemon sold 40 million sets of designed chopsticks. The collaboration was a huge success. Hajime eventually designed special chopsticks for Emperor Akihito and Empress Michiko.

In 2009, he designed gunbai for sumo wrestling referees, as part of the NASCAR YOKOSO! Japan project. A gunbai is a type of Japanese war fan, which is solid, rather than folding, and usually made of wood. They were used by samurai officers to communicate commands to their troops and are still used in sumo matches. The sumo wrestling organization holds much respect for old traditional regulations and has strict rules. As such, it is a very rare case for a non-traditional contemporary artist like Hajime to design gunbai, one of the most important items for sumo matches.

Hajime designed special gunbai for Kenjirou Kimura, a gyōji or sumo referee. The gunbai was named Hana-ha Utsukusisugite E ni dekinai (花美絵無), or "Flowers are too beautiful to be drawn in pictures". Hajime designed gunbai by utilizing a baseball bat and put floral paintings on the fan. Floral designs on gunbai are very unusual; this floral gunbai surprised people. It is the first recorded case of a florally designed gunbai in hundreds of years of sumo history.

=== NASCAR car design ===
In 2009, Shigeaki Hattori, an ex-auto racing driver and the owner of the Hattori Racing Enterprise (HRE) team in NASCAR, introduced him to the Japan Tourism Agency. Hattori offered Hajime the task of designing a racing car for his team in the feeder ARCA Racing Series. Hajime joined the "Yokoso! Japan" project, which is part of the Japanese National Tourism Organization's "Visit Japan" campaign aimed at attracting Americans tourists. Hajime designed a Toyota Camry with his favorite motifs, such as flowers and birds. The racing car supported Hattori in his efforts to draw visitors to the country.

=== 2009—present: KIMITOMO ===
After he completed those projects in 2009, he traveled the North Pole, where he stayed for a few months. During this journey, he was trapped by a blizzard and had a chilblain on his right leg. The damage was terrible and about to become necrotic, but his leg completely recovered. Hajime loves travel: he titled himself “traveler” on his official website. He has visited more than 30 countries. During those travels in other countries, he always finds some new idea for his art works.

During the North Pole visits in 2009, his best friend Tatsuya Tsuchiko asked him back to Japan to start new art project. On his return, Ayako Hibiki (President of Funai Consulting Co.Ltd at that time) recommended him to create pictures of Japanese Shinto gods.

In spring 2010, he made a contract with Injester Inc to publish his Gods drawings. He published a story book entitled "KIMITOMO – world is yours". The story is about those Shinto Gods in our modern life. KIMITOMO means your friend in Japanese. KIMITOMO sold a thousand copies during its first month.

=== Tokai no Mori Garden ===
Before Hajime started his career as a professional artist, he ran his own business. Tokai no Mori Garden is an open space café restaurant with an art gallery in Setagaya, Tokyo. He started this restaurant in 2000 and completed it in April 2006. The concept was a "secret base for grownups". The restaurant has 60,277-square-foot (5,599.9 m^{2}) of floor-space, which is fairly large for a business in the middle of Tokyo. Tokai means "city" and mori means "forest". As the name implies, this open space restaurant had a lot of trees and flowers. He closed his restaurant business in 2007, and decided to make his living through his artwork.

== Other projects ==
- Hajime used platinum in the dye for the kimono he designed for Taichi Saotome. The corporate sponsor insured it for 40 million yen (US$483,480). This made a record as the most expensive kimono in the world.
- All Nippon Airways(ANA): Hajime designed special chopsticks for use on their planes.
- Platinum Pen Co Ltd, where writing instruments have been manufactured since 1919, had corroboration product. The president of Platinum Pen presented a very special fountain pen, of platinum, to Hajime.
- Yahoo! Japan: designed background picture of Yahoo SNS.
- Kyoko Inukai (author): Hajime appeared as a character in her book titled Teionyakedo (published 2002).
- Taichi Saotome: published picture book of Taichi Saotome titled 13–15 (Wanibooks Co. Ltd; 2008). Hajime used the name "Cameracamen" for this photo book.
- Japan Post Holdings : DM 20th Grand Prize Winner of 2006
- Japan Art Grand Prize Holbein 2001
- Setagaya Art Museum Exhibition Award 2000
