= Iga Province =

Former province of Japan

Map of Japanese provinces with Iga province highlighted

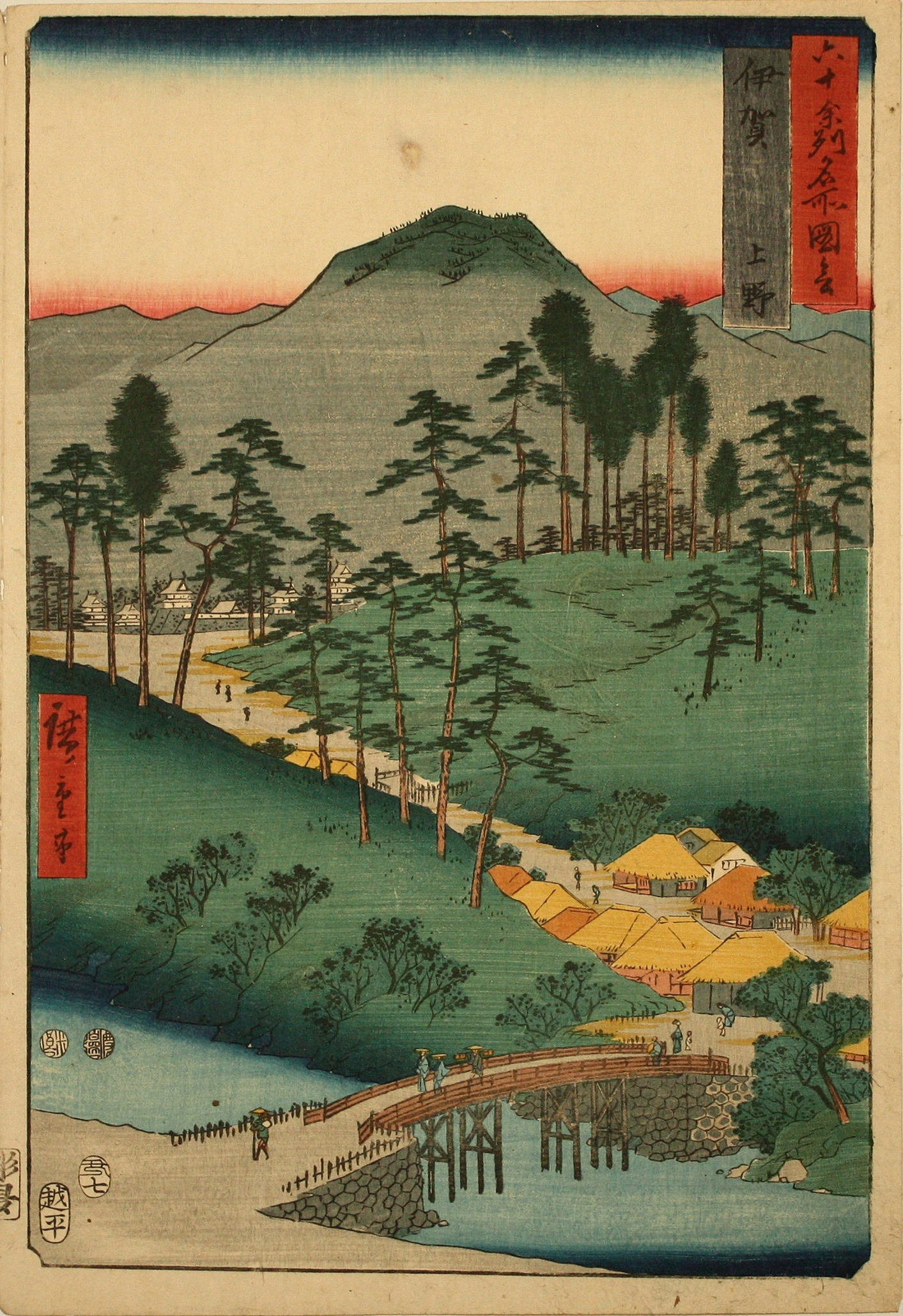
Ukiyo-e print by Hiroshige showing Iga-Ueno Castle

Iga Province (伊賀国, Iga no Kuni; Japanese pronunciation: [í.ɡä̀ (nò̞ kɯ̈̀.ɲ̟ì), -ŋä̀ (nò̞ kɯ̈̀.ɲ̟ì)]) was a province of Japan located in what is today part of western Mie Prefecture. Its abbreviated name was Ishū (伊州). Iga is classified as one of the provinces of the Tōkaidō. Under the Engishiki classification system, Iga was ranked as an "inferior country" (下国 gekoku) and a "near country" (近国 kingoku).

Iga was bordered by Ise to the east and south, Ōmi to the north, Yamato to the west and south, and Yamashiro Province to the northwest. It roughly coincides with the modern municipalities of Iga and Nabari in Mie Prefecture as well as Yagyu in Nara Prefecture. Surrounded by mountains, historically, Iga Province was rather inaccessible due to extremely poor road conditions. However, the area is now relatively easy to access from nearby Nara and Kyoto, as well as the larger cities of Osaka and Nagoya.

== History ==
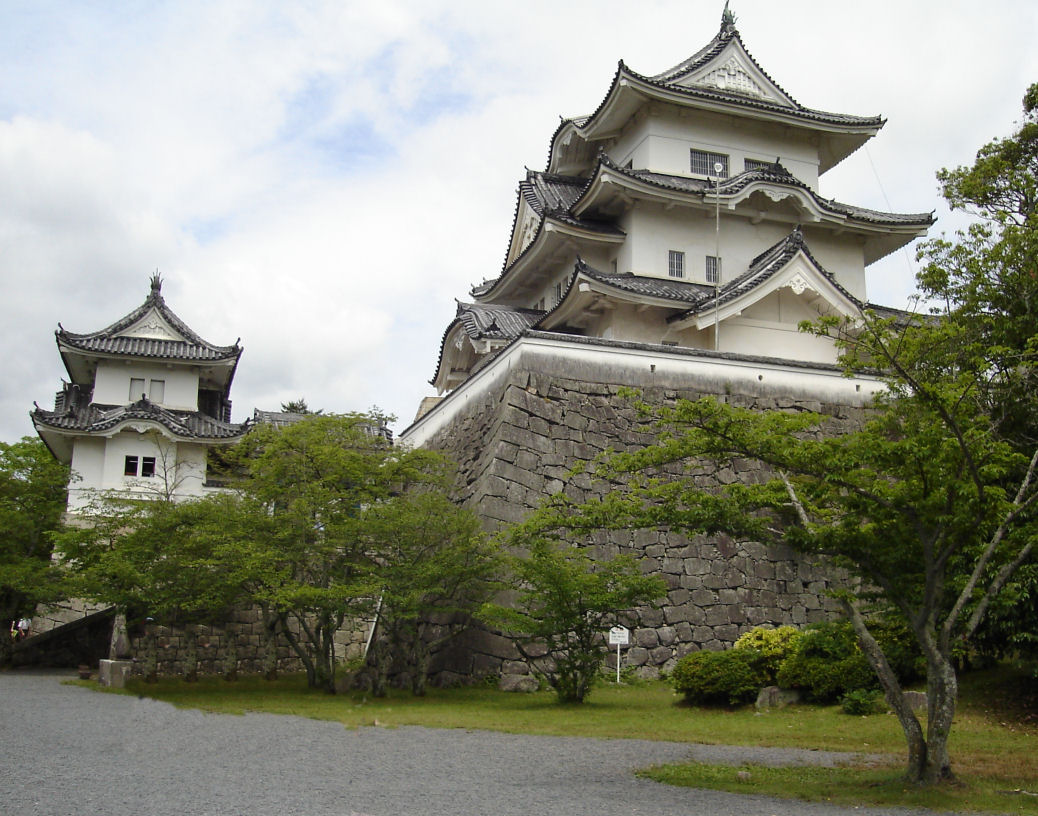
Iga Ueno Castle

=== Asuka period ===
Iga was separated from Ise Province during the Asuka period, around 680 AD. The provincial capital was located in what is now part of the city of Iga, along with the ruins of the Iga Kokubun-ji. The Ichinomiya of the province is the Aekuni Shrine, which is also located in what is now part of the city of Iga.

=== Heian, Kamakura and Muromachi periods ===
Little is known of the subsequent history of the province during the Heian and Kamakura periods. However, by the middle of the Muromachi period, Iga became effectively independent from its nominal feudal rulers and established a confederacy, Iga Sokoku Ikki. During this period, Iga came to be known as a center for ninja activity. This serves that basis of its claim, along with Kōka in what is now Shiga Prefecture, to be one of the birthplaces of the ninja clans and ninjutsu.

In 1581, two years after a failed invasion led by his son, the warlord Oda Nobunaga launched a massive invasion of Iga, attacking from six directions with a force of 40,000 to 60,000 men which effectively destroyed the political power of the ninja (see the Tenshō Iga War).

=== Tokugawa shogunate ===
With the establishment of the Tokugawa shogunate, Iga was briefly (1600–1608) under the control of Iga-Ueno Domain, a 200,000-koku han during the rule of Tsutsui Sadatsugu, a former retainer of Toyotomi Hideyoshi. However, the Tsutsui clan was dispossessed in 1608, and the territory of the domain was given to Tōdō Takatora, the daimyō of Tsu Domain. It remained a part of Tsu Domain until the Meiji Restoration.

=== Edo period ===
Notable Edo-period people from Iga included the famous samurai Hattori Hanzō and the haiku poet Matsuo Bashō. Iga Ueno Castle was retained by Tsu Domain as a secondary administrative center for the western portion of the domain.

=== Mie Prefecture ===
After the abolition of the han system in July 1871, Tsu Domain became "Tsu Prefecture", which later became part of Mie Prefecture.

== Historical districts ==
Iga was divided into 4 Districts (郡), which were further subdivided into 197 villages. The total assessed value of the province in terms of kokudaka was 110,843 koku.

- Ahai District (阿拝郡) – merged with Yamada District to become Ayama District (阿山郡) on March 29, 1896
- Iga District (伊賀郡) – merged with Nabari District to become Naga District (名賀郡) on March 29, 1896
- Nabari District (名張郡) – merged with Iga District to become Naga District on March 29, 1896
- Yamada District (山田郡) – merged with Ahai District to become Ayama District on March 29, 1896

== See also ==
- Iga-ryū, the Iga Ninja school of ninjutsu
