= Masuyama Castle =

Castle in Honshu, Japan

- 増山城
- Tonami, Toyama Prefecture, Japan
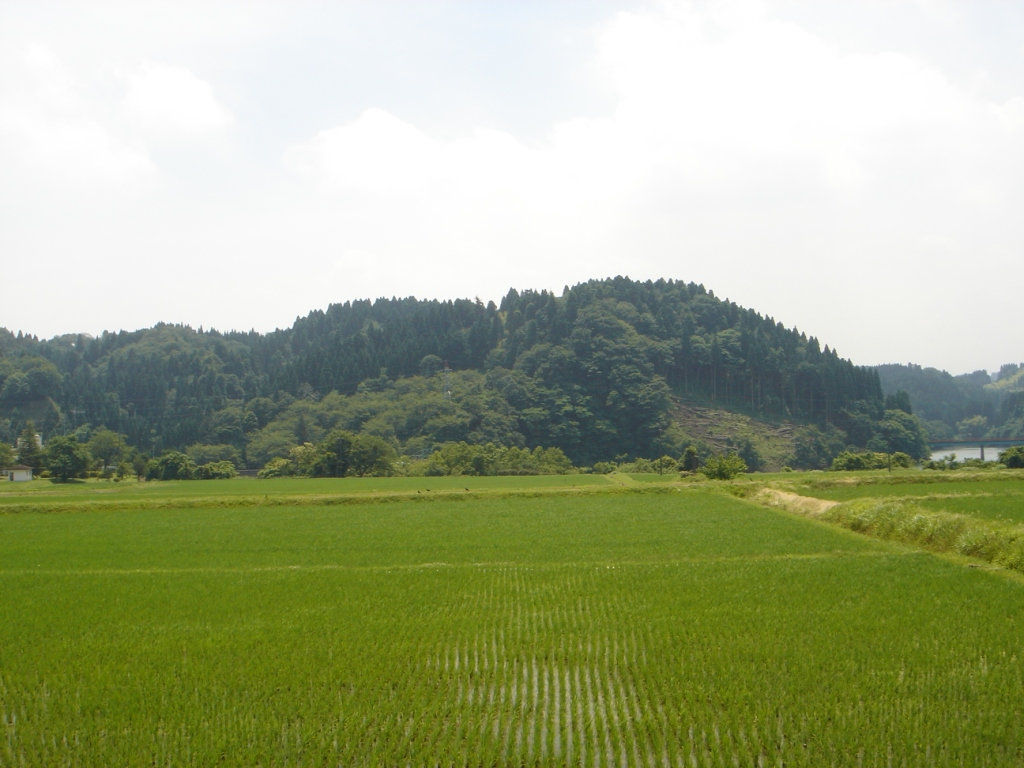
- Site of Masuyama Castle

Site information
- Type: yamashiro-style Japanese castle
- Open to the public: yes
- Condition: ruins

Location
- Masuyama Castle
- Location within Toyama Prefecture Location within Japan
- Coordinates: 36°39′07.73″N 137°2′30.36″E

Site history
- Built: c.1394
- In use: Sengoku period
- Demolished: c.1610

Masuyama Castle (増山城, Masuyama-jō) was a Muromachi period yamashiro-style Japanese castle located in what is now part of the city of Tonami, Toyama Prefecture in the Hokuriku region of Honshu, Japan. The ruins have been protected by the central government as a National Historic Site since 2009. It was also known as Wada Castle (和田城, Wada-jō)

== Background ==
Masuyama Castle is located on a 120-meter hill in the mountainous area which separates the Tonami Plain from the Toyama Plain in Etchū Province. This location is on the border of the three counties of Tonami, Imizu, and Nei, and the castle could command the major transportation route within the province. Although the Hokuriku kaidō, a highway which connected Kyoto with the Hokuriku region, passed Kurikara Pass at the border of Kaga Province and followed the Shokawa River to Toyama Bay avoided this area by taking a coastal route, the more direct route passed through this hilly area and Masuyama Castle was located to guard this strategic area. Masuyama Castle is a regarded as one of three major mountain castles of Etchū Province along with Moriyama Castle near the Noto Peninsula and Matsukura Castle in Uozu area.

== History ==
The foundation of Masuyama Castle was founded during the Nanboku-cho period by Momonoi Tadatsuna (d. 1376), the shugo of Etchū Province. The name Wada Castle came from the nearby Wada River. Momonoi later revolted against the Ashikaga shogunate, and the castle was seized by a shogunal army and awarded to the Ninomiya clan, but the castle fell into ruins shortly after the conclusion of the campaign. Around a hundred years later, the castle was rebuilt as a stronghold of the Jinbō clan, retainers of the Hatakeyama clan who had been awarded with the position of shugo of Etchū Province. The Hatakeyama preferred to rule in absentia from Kyoto, and the province was sub-divided between the Jinbō, Shiina and Yusa clans to administer on their behalf.

By the end of the 15th century, the Hatakeyama clan was significantly weaker and unable to exert their authority over Etchū. Jinbo Yoshimune (d. 1531) attempted to ally with the Ikkō-ikki movement and to become independent, but was crushed by the Hatakeyama and by the forces of the Uesugi clan from neighbouring Echigo Province. However, his son Jinbō Nagatomo (d. 1572) took advantage of internal conflicts within the Hatakeyama and the Uesugi and surpassed the rival Shiina clan, uniting the province, and established Toyama Castle, with Masuyama Castle remaining an important secondary centre. Nevertheless, the Uesugi under Uesugi Kenshin invaded Etchū in 1559 and seized both Toyama and Masuyama. He was forced to retake it again in 1562 and in 1576. After Kenshin's death, the area came under the control of Oda Nobunaga, who assigned Etchū to Shibata Katsuie. The Oda army attacked Masuyama and destroyed its jōkamachi in 1581. The castle was subsequently restored by Sassa Narimasa in 1582. Narimasa's situation was unstable. A direct bannerman of Nobunaga, he served Toyotomi Hideyoshi reluctantly, and was later sent to Higo Province in Kyushu, with Masuyama Castle being awarded to Maeda Toshiie. After the establishment of the Tokugawa shogunate, the castle was finally abolished around 1610.

== Current situation ==
Masuyama Castle spread over a hill enclosing an area 1,000 meter long and 500 meter width, making it one of the largest mountain castles in Hokuriku region. At the western hillside opposite the river was the castle town, and remnants of a clay wall separating the castle town from the castle still remains.

All of the structures of Masuyama Castle have long been lost and only some remnants of dry moats and the lines of the clay ramparts remain. The site is open to the public. The castle was listed as one of the Continued Top 100 Japanese Castles in 2017.

== See also ==
- List of Historic Sites of Japan (Toyama)
