= Hachiya Yoritaka =

Japanese samurai

- 蜂屋 頼隆
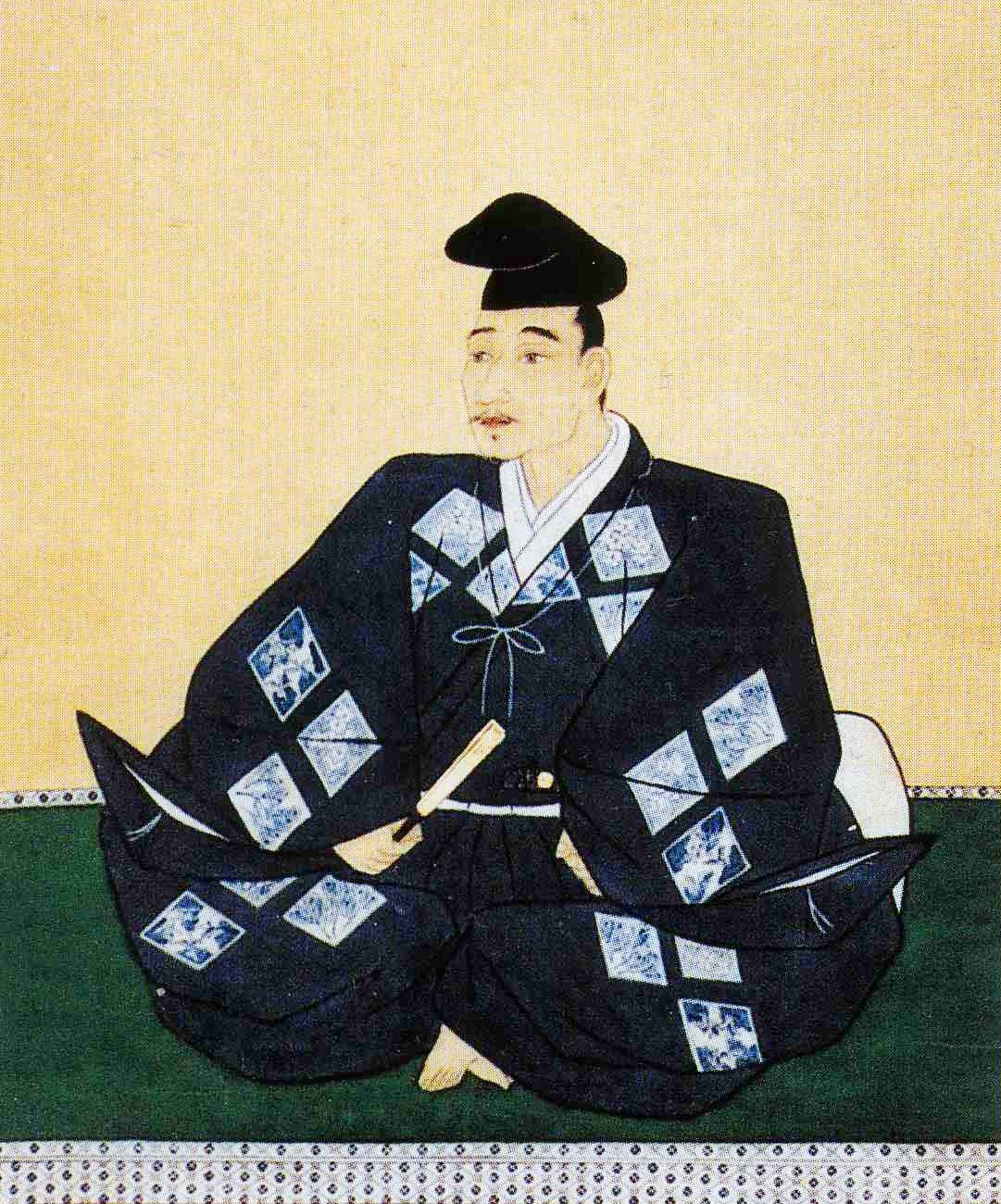

Lord of Tsuruga Domain
- In office 1583–1589
- Preceded by: Shibata Katsuie
- Succeeded by: Otani Yoshitsugu

Personal details
- Born: 1534
- Died: November 3, 1589
- Relations: Niwa Nagahide (brother in law)

Military service
- Allegiance: Oda clan Toyotomi clan
- Battles/wars: Battle of Akatsuka; Siege of Shoryuji Castle; Siege of Mitsuji; Siege of Itami; Battle of Yamazaki; Battle of Shizugatake; Toyama Campaign; Kyushu Campaign

Hachiya Yoritaka (蜂屋 頼隆, 1534 – November 3, 1589) was a Japanese samurai of the Sengoku period who served the Oda clan. First he served the Toki clan and Saito clan. When Oda Nobunaga started campaign on Mino Province, he became a vassal of Nobunaga as a member of "Kuro-horo-shu" (bodyguard unit in black)

== Military life ==
In 1552, Hachiya clan took part in the Battle of Akatsuka as vanguard (possibly Yoritaka) against Yamaguchi clan.

In late 1568, during Omi campaign, Yoritaka joined Shibata Katsuie, Hosokawa Fujitaka, Mori Yoshinari and Sakai Masahisa in attacking Iwanari Tomomichi at Shōryūji Castle.

In 1576, he took part at Siege of Mitsuji, the battle was part of the eleven-year Ishiyama Hongan-ji War.

In the Siege of Itami (1579), Yoritaka also conducted the execution of the Araki Murashige family who rose in revolt against Nobunaga.

In 1582, he took part at the Battle of Yamazaki against Akechi Mitsuhide.

In 1583, at Battle of Shizugatake, Yoritaka served Hashiba Hideyoshi and participated in the attack on Gifu Castle of Oda Nobutaka. After the battle, he was given 40,000 koku in Tsuruga of Echizen Province.

In 1585, under Toyotomi Hideyoshi he fought in the Toyama Campaign against Sassa Narimasa.

In 1587, Yoritaka also joint attack at Hideyoshi's Kyushu campaign against Shimazu clan.

== Death ==
He died in 1589, at the age of 56. Around that time, Naomasa, Yoritaka's adopted son who was the fourth son of Niwa Nagahide, seemed to be already dead, and so he had no heir and the Hachiya clan ended.
