= Battle of Kiyosu Castle =

1552 battle between the forces of Oda Nobunaga and his cousin, Oda Nobutomo

Coordinates: 35°11′59″N 136°51′10″E

- Part of the Sengoku period
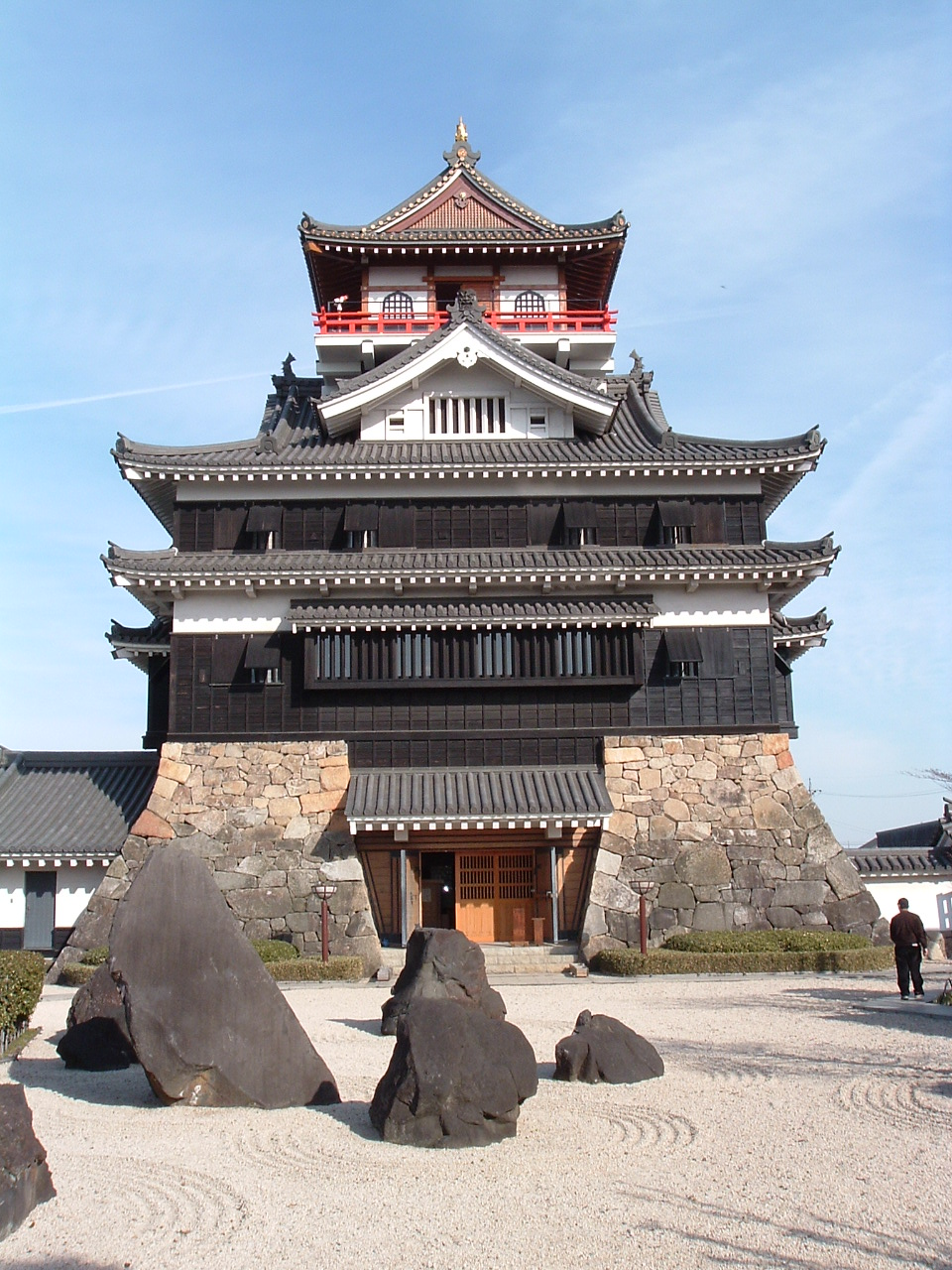
- Reconstructed keep of Kiyosu Castle
Date	1552–1554
Location	Kiyosu, Owari Province, Japan
Result	Oda Nobunaga victory
Territorial changes	In 1554. Oda Nobunaga captured the provincial capital of Kiyosu and united the Southern Owari province

Belligerents
Oda clan of Nagoya Castle	Oda clan of Kiyosu Castle

Commanders and leaders
Oda Nobunaga; Oda Nobumitsu; Chūjō Ietada; Niwa Nagahide; Ikeda Tsuneoki; Shibata Katsuie; Maeda Toshiie	Oda Nobutomo; Oda Sanmi; Sakai Taizen; Sakai Jinzuke; Kawajiri Yoichi

Strength
3,000	3,000

Casualties and losses
Light	Heavy
- Location within Aichi Prefecture Battle of Kiyosu Castle (Japan)

Battle of Kiyosu Castle or Battle of Kaizu (August 16, 1552 - April 20, 1554) was the first victory of the young Oda Nobunaga in his struggle to unite the province of Owari against his cousin, Oda Nobutomo, deputy governor of southern Owari.

== Background ==
Places in the provinces of Owari and Mikawa around 1552 on the map of Aichi Prefecture. Places under the control of Oda Nobunaga are marked in red.

At the time when the seventeen-year-old Oda Nobunaga inherited family estates (of the so-called Shibata branch of Oda family, though Shobata Castle, built before 1520 by his grandfather, was abandoned in 1538) in the southwestern part of Owari Province (around Nagoya Castle) in spring of 1552, the southern parts of the province were ruled by his cousins, Oda from Kiyosu Castle, and the eastern parts of Owari were ruled by the powerful Imagawa clan, who at the time ruled the neighboring provinces of Mikawa, Totomi and Suruga, and their vassals, the Matsudaira clan (later Tokugawa) from Mikawa.

== First Battle (1552) ==
Immediately after the death of Nobunaga's father Oda Nobuhide in spring of 1551, his cousin Oda Nobutomo, deputy governor (shugodai) of the southern Owari, attacked his domain and captured two forts, but was suppressed by Nobunaga and his uncle, Oda Nobumitsu (Oda Magosaburo), lord of Moriyama Castle. Together, they re-capture the forts and defeated Nobutomo's forces at the village of Kaizu (3 km from Kiyosu), killing more than 80 prominent samurai, and burned the outskirts of Kiyosu on August 16, 1552 (Lunar calendar).

== Second Battle (1553) ==
Next year, on July 12, 1553, Oda Nobutomo executed the legal governor (shugo) of the province, Shiba Yoshimune, who lived as a glorified hostage at his castle, for conspiring with Nobunaga. Such a brutal violation of the governor and Shogun's authority (who was formally venerated by all Japanese daimyos at the time as their legal and ancestral lord) isolated Nobutomo from the former allies, and the governor's son Shiba Yoshikane managed to escape to Nobunaga in Nagoya. Nobunaga mobilized his forces and on the July 18th defeated Nobutomo under the walls of Kiyosu, mainly thanks to the unusually long spears (between 18 and 21 feet) of his ashigaru, which Nobunaga had designed himself. Retainers of Kiyosu suffered significant losses (more than 30 prominent samurai), but Nobunaga did not dare to attack the castle, so left it under a blockade, waiting for the opportunity to take it by cunning.

== Third Battle (1554) ==
=== Fall of Kiyosu Castle ===
After defeating the powerful Imagawa clan in the Battle of Muraki (January 24, 1554), and liberating parts of southeastern Owari from their domination, Nobunaga gained a great reputation in Owari and got a free hand for the final showdown with Oda Nobutomo of Kiyosu. Having lost most of his vassals in the battles around the castle, Sakai Dozen, Nobutomo's chief adviser, offered Nobunaga's uncle Nobumitsu the position of provincial governor if he betrayed Nobunaga. Nobumitsu apparently agreed to betray Nobunaga, and with a group of warriors he was released in Kiyosu, but during the night his men opened the gates and the castle was conquered by storm (April 20, 1554). Oda Nobutomo was forced to commit seppuku, while Sakai Dozen managed to escape to the province of Suruga, finding refuge with Nobunaga's archenemy, Imagawa Yoshimoto.

== Aftermath ==
Thus Nobunaga conquered Kiyosu Castle and became lord of the southern Owari: as a reward, his uncle Nobumitsu was given Nagoya Castle and two eastern districts (out of four) of lower Owari, while Nobunaga moved to Kiyosu Castle as his new seat.

== Literature ==
- Chaplin, Danny (2018). Sengoku Jidai. Nobunaga, Hideyoshi, and Ieyasu : three unifiers of Japan. Createspace Independent Publishing Platform. pp. 55–63. ISBN 978-1-9834-5020-4. OCLC 1111714915.
- Ōta, Gyūichi (2011). The chronicle of Lord Nobunaga. J. S. A. Elisonas, Jeroen Pieter Lamers. Leiden: Brill. p. 3. ISBN 978-90-04-20456-0. OCLC 743693801.
- Turnbull, Stephen R. (2005). Samurai commanders. Oxford: Osprey Publishing. p. 6. ISBN 1-84176-743-3. OCLC 60834971.
- Turnbull, Stephen R. (2002). War in Japan 1467-1615. Oxford: Osprey. p. 18. ISBN 1-84176-480-9. OCLC 50564411.
