= Siege of Uozu =

Part of a border dispute

Coordinates: 36°48′48″N 137°23′51″E

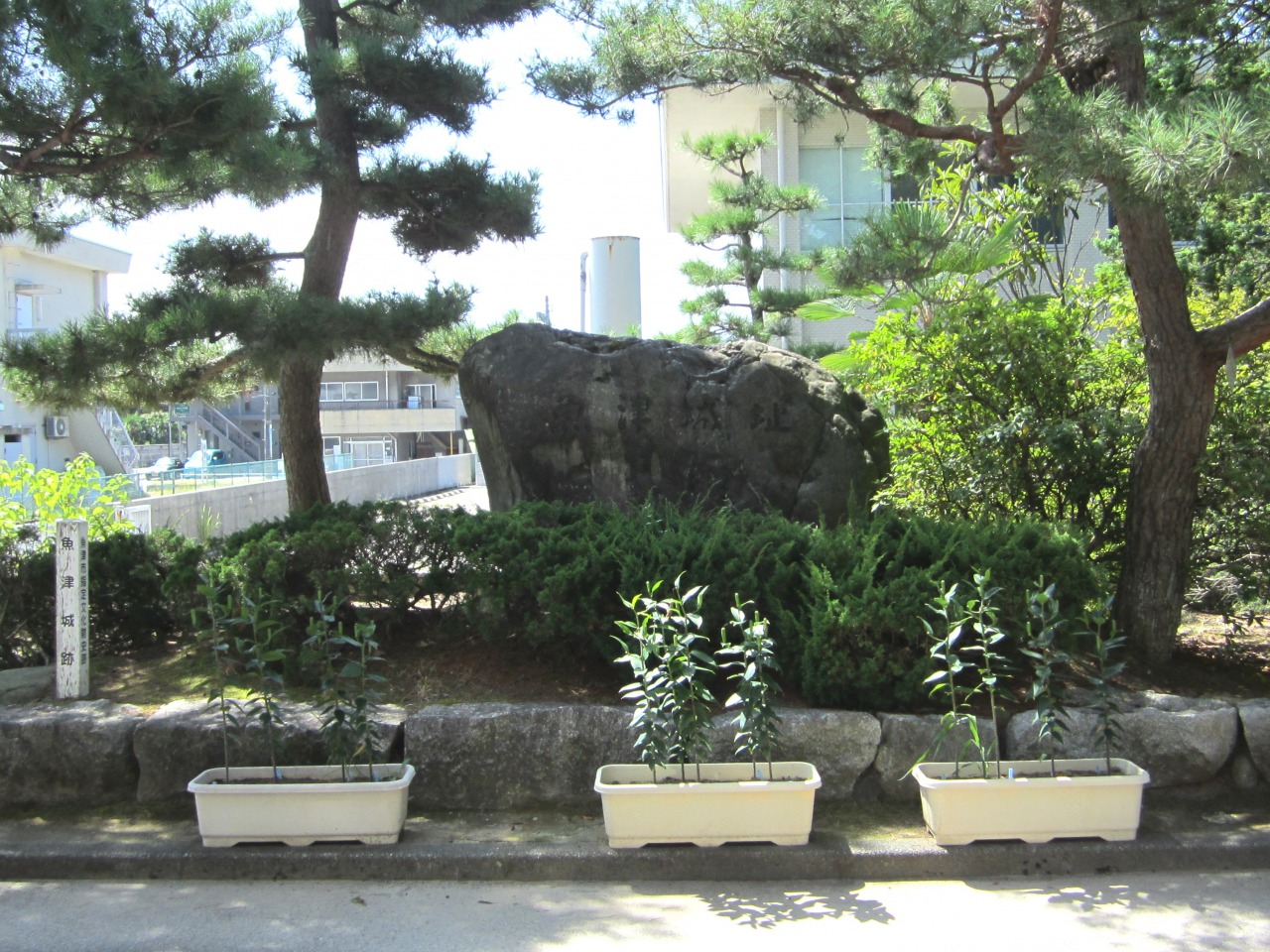
Date	May–June 1582
Location	Uozu, Etchu province, Japan
Result	Oda victory
Territorial changes	Uozu and Matsukura Castle fall to Nobunaga

Belligerents
Forces of Oda Nobunaga	Forces of Uesugi Kagekatsu

Commanders and leaders
Shibata Katsuie; Sassa Narimasa	Uesugi Kagekatsu

Strength
40,000	3,800

The 1582 Siege of Uozu Castle (魚津城の戦い, Uozu-jō no tatakai) was part of a border dispute between two daimyō of Japan's Sengoku period. The territories of Oda Nobunaga and the Uesugi clan, led by Uesugi Kagekatsu, met in Etchu Province; both were under threat from the Ikkō-ikki of Etchu, and from one another.

Seeking to ensure the security of Nobunaga's possessions, Shibata Katsuie and Sassa Narimasa, two of his chief generals, rode north from Toyama Castle, and laid siege to both the town of Uozu and nearby Matsukura Castle. Uozu fell on June 3, 1582, and Oda Nobunaga would die eighteen days later, in Kyoto, in the Incident at Honnō-ji.
