= Niwa Nagahide =

Japanese samurai (1535–1585)

- 丹羽 長秀
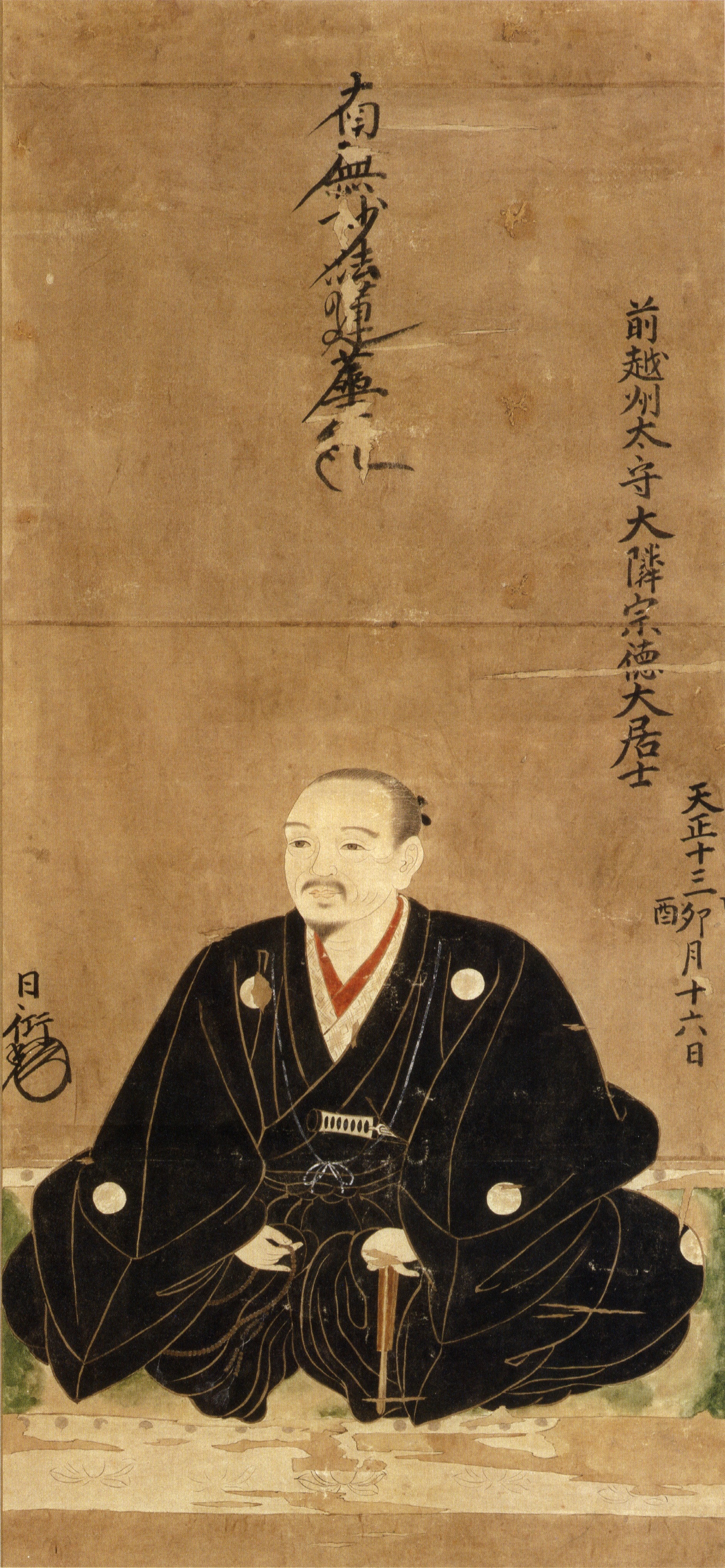

Head of Niwa clan
- In office 1573–1585
- Succeeded by: Niwa Nagashige

Lord of Wakasa
- In office 1573–1585
- Preceded by: Asakura clan
- Succeeded by: Yamauchi Kazutoyo

Personal details
- Born: October 16, 1535 Nishi-ku, Nagoya, Owari Province
- Died: May 15, 1585 (aged 49) Nagakute, Aichi
- Nickname(s): Gorōzaemon (五郎左衛門); Kome Gorōza (米五郎左); Oni Gorōza (鬼五郎左)

Military service
- Allegiance: Oda clan Toyotomi clan
- Unit: Niwa clan
- Commands: Sawayama Castle
- Battles/wars: Battle of Kiyosu Castle; Battle of Ino; Battle of Ukino; Battle of Inabayama; Battle of Kannonji; Battle of Anegawa; Ishiyama Hongan-ji War; Siege of Mount Hiei; Siege of Saimyoji; Siege of Ichijōdani Castle; Battle of Nagashino; Siege of Mitsuji; Battle of Tedorigawa; Tenshō Iga War; Battle of Yamazaki; Battle of Shizugatake

Niwa Nagahide (丹羽 長秀; October 16, 1535 – May 15, 1585), also known as Gorōzaemon (五郎左衛門), his other legal alias was Hashiba Echizen no Kami (羽柴越前守), was a Japanese samurai of the Sengoku through Azuchi-Momoyama periods of the 16th century. He served as senior retainer to the Oda clan, and was eventually a daimyō in his own right. Going on to fight in the Oda clan's major campaigns, including Mino Campaign 1567, Omi Campaign 1568, the Honganji Campaign from 1570 to 1580, and Iga Campaign 1581, he was named one of the administrators of Kyoto after Nobunaga entered that city in 1568.

== Early life ==
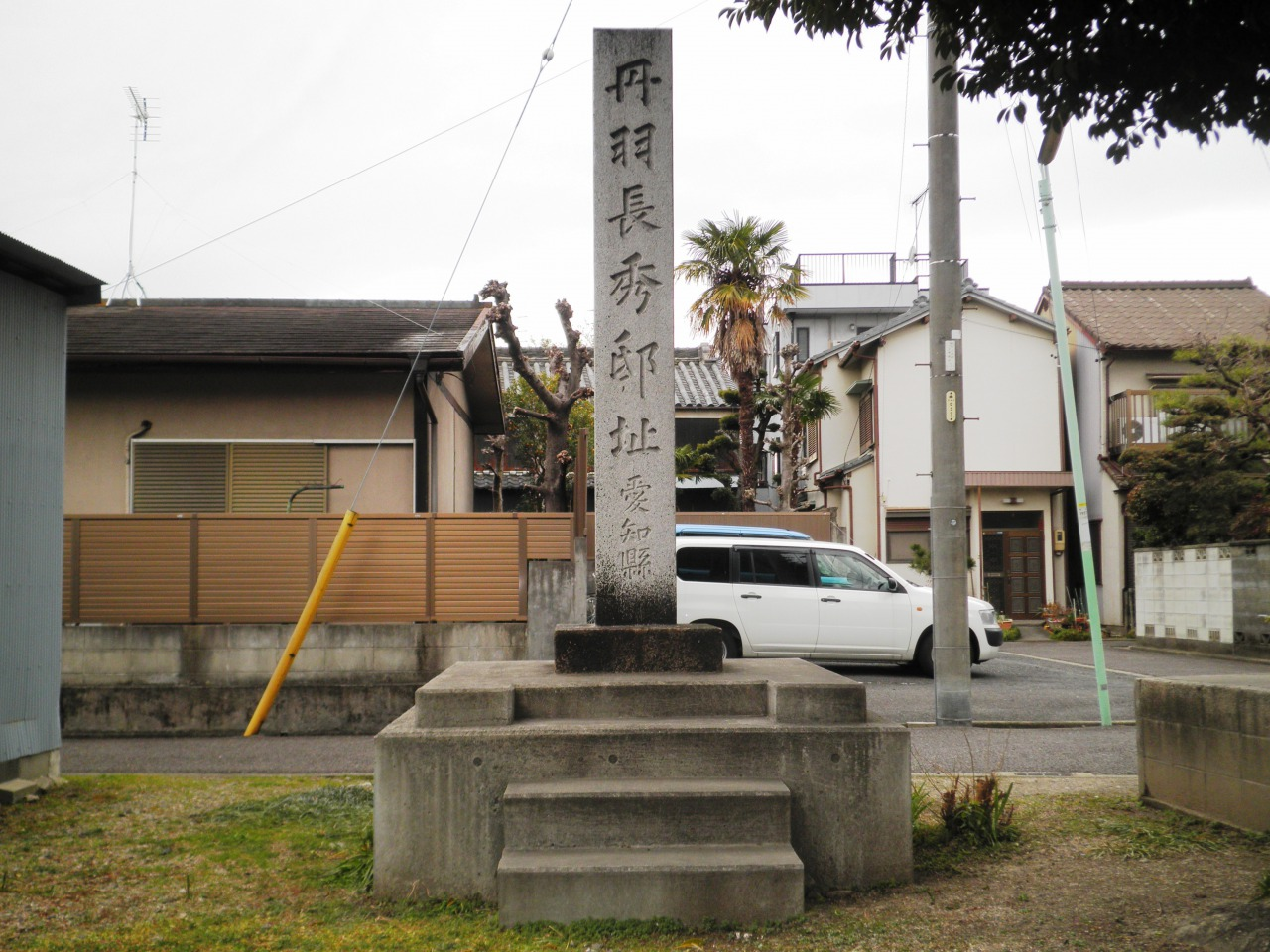
Site of Niwa Nagahide residence, Nagoya

Nagahide was born in what is now Nishi-ku, Nagoya, but then part of Aichi District, Owari Province. From his youth, Nagahide served Oda Nobunaga and became one of his senior retainers, he fought in the Battle of Kiyosu Castle against Oda Nobutomo, deputy governor of southern Owari. He stayed by Nobunaga's side when his brother defied him during the Battle of Inō in 1555 and also fought in the Battle of Ukino against Oda Nobukata, deputy governor of northern Owari in 1558.

== Military life ==
In 1560, Nagahide also had military service during the Battle of Okehazama, but he wasn't a part of the main strike force.

According to the Nobunaga Kōki, he served in the Battle of Inabayama 1567, he was part of Nobunaga's main division against Saitō Tatsuoki.

In 1568, during the Omi campaign, he contributed in the conquest of Battle of Kannonji castle and was a part of Nobunaga's personal formation. His participation made him favored by Nobunaga. He served in the Battle of Anegawa 1570 against the Azai-Asakura clan, and the Hongan-ji campaign from 1570–1580.

In February 1571, Nagahide entered Sawayama Castle after Isono Kazumasa moved out, and since then he was active as a castle general with Kawajiri Hidetaka. In September 1571, after Nobunaga ordered for the Tendai Temple affiliated with Enryaku-ji at Mt. Hiei to be burned down, Nagahide and Hidetaka burned down Saimyōji temple.

Nagahide also served in the Siege of Ichijodani Castle 1573, in the Battle of Nagashino 1575 against Takeda clan and the Battle of Tedorigawa 1577 under Shibata Katsuie against Uesugi Kenshin.

When he wasn't in battle, he was aiding Nobunaga's conquests by taking care of political affairs and had responsibility for constructing Azuchi Castle, which began in 1576 and was completed in 1579. One of the characters of his family name was said to have been granted for the Hashiba name for Hideyoshi. His participation made him favored by Nobunaga, among many of other deeds. The extent of Nobunaga's trust can be seen by the fact that Nagahide married Nobunaga's niece, while his son was Niwa Nagashige. These services let Nagahide rule over the fief of Obama Domain in Wakasa Province, and Sawayama Castle in Ōmi Province.

In 1581, in a military parade held at Kyoto before the eyes of the Emperor as well as foreign missionaries, Nagahide was given the honor of leading the procession. In the same year, he fought in second Tensho Iga War against Iga inhabitants.

In 1582, as Oda Nobutaka's second in command, Nagahide launched a campaign on Shikoku, but before he made any progress, Nobunaga died during an attack by Akechi Mitsuhide. Nagahide abandoned the campaign and turned back to join Hashiba Hideyoshi in avenging Nobunaga's death by killing Mitsuhide at the Battle of Yamazaki. Later, at the subsequent meeting in Kiyosu Castle where the future of the Oda clan was discussed, Nagahide supported Hideyoshi's position.

In 1583, Nagahide assisted Hideyoshi at the Battle of Shizugatake and gained Echizen Province and Kaga Province to rule, worth over 1,230,000 koku. He thus became one of the most powerful retainers and daimyō.

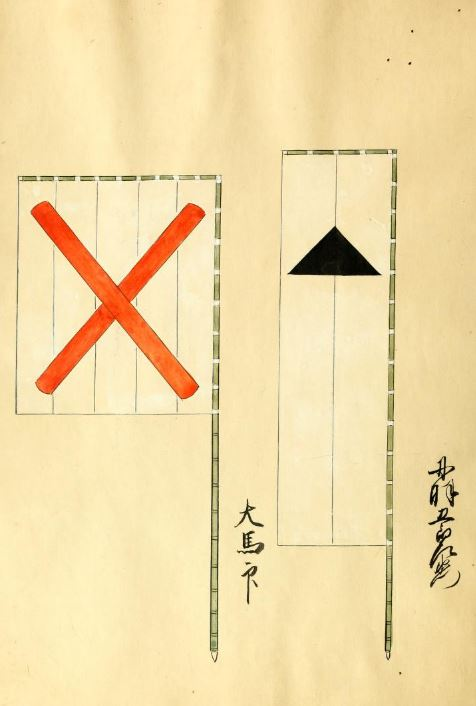
Niwa Nagahide Banner and Battle Standard

== Death ==
Nagahide died of illness in 1585. There is a conflicting record that Nagahide had not died of an illness, but on seeing Hideyoshi gather more power and eclipsing the Oda clan Nagahide had so long served, he felt that he had not lived up for the good of Nobunaga and the Oda clan as a whole and committed suicide.

His son Niwa Nagashige later became lord of Shirakawa Castle in northern Japan, and by the time of Nagahide's grandson Niwa Mitsushige, the family's 100,000 koku landholding was moved to Nihonmatsu, where they remained for the duration of the Edo Period.

== Azamaru sword ==
According to the Nobunaga Kōki, Nagahide was presented the treasured sword "Azamaru", initially held by Taira Kagekiyo. Another previous owner, Kageyama Kazukage, was blinded during the Siege of Ôgaki castle in 1547, and the next owner, Niwa Nagahide, began having eye trouble, and so the sword was believed to be cursed. Nagahide donated the sword to the Atsuta shrine, in order to be freed from the curse. After the donation, his eye troubles went away.
