= Battle of Akatsuka =

1552 battle between the forces of Oda Nobunaga and Imagawa clan

Coordinates: 35°4′43″N 136°57′3″E

- Part of the Sengoku period
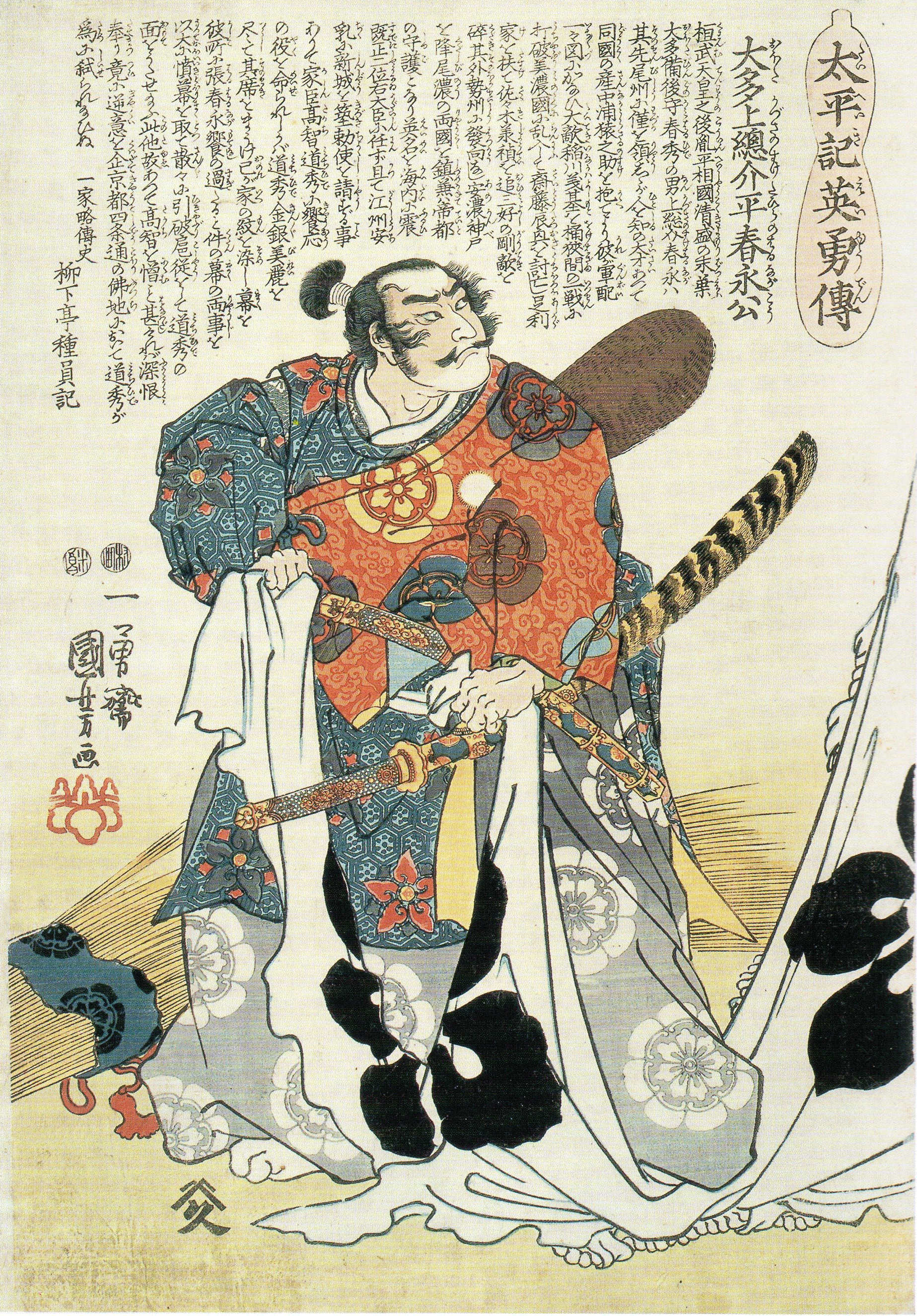
- Oda Nobunaga (1534–1582) was but a minor young daimyo at the time of the battle.
| Date | May 10th 1552 |
| Location | Nagoya, Owari Province, Japan |
| Result | Yamaguchi victory; Nobunaga retreat |
| Territorial changes | Oda Nobunaga lost parts of south-eastern Owari to Imagawa clan of Suruga |

Belligerents
| Oda clan | Imagawa clan |

Commanders and leaders
| Oda Nobunaga; Naitō Shōsuke; Hasegawa Kyōsuke; Hachiya Yoritaka | Yamaguchi Noriyoshi |

Strength
| 800 | 1,500 |

Casualties and losses
| 30 Samurai; Unknown Ashigaru | Light |
- Location within Aichi Prefecture Battle of Akatsuka (Japan)

Battle of Akatsuka (or Akazuka, May 10, 1552) was the first recorded battle of the young Oda Nobunaga in his struggle to unite the province of Owari, against one of the former vassals of his late father (Oda Nobuhide, died in 1551), who switched his allegiance to the powerful Imagawa clan of Suruga province.

== Background ==
Places in the provinces of Owari and Mikawa around 1552 on the map of Aichi Prefecture. Places under the control of Oda Nobunaga are marked in red.

Oda Nobuhide, a daimyo with significant influence in southern Owari, died on April 8, 1551, after a short contagious illness. His heir, Oda Nobunaga, who was barely 18 at the time, inherited a large feudal domain around Nagoya Castle, but he enjoyed generally bad reputation amongst the people of Owari for his eccentric and rude public behavior. Nobunaga mostly spent his time between the age of 13 (age of maturity at the time) and 18 in hunting, riding, practicing archery and shooting arquebus (still a novelty in Japan at the time), but also wrestling, swimming, watching sumo and visiting taverns and brothels with his friends. He also showed complete disdain for formal clothing and proper social behavior of a lord, wearing sleeveless bathrobe and short trousers tied with hemp rope in public, eating melons while riding backwards on his horse and often dancing in female clothing in taverns, gaining the nickname The Fool of Owari. Many of his father's retainers presumed their new lord as too weak or immature to lead and protect them and their lands, and some even contemplated open rebellion and replacing Nobunaga with his younger brother, Oda Nobuyuki, or defecting to more powerful regional lords.

== Battle ==
In early of 1552, barely several month after his father's death, one of Nobunaga's senior retainers, Yamaguchi Noritsugu, the castellan of Narumi Castle, and his son Yamaguchi Kurojiro (Noriyoshi) defected to the powerful Imagawa clan of Suruga (who controlled neighbor eastern provinces of Mikawa and Totomi) and invited their troops to Owari, who made several fortifications on Oda land. In response, on May 17 th (Lunar calendar) Oda Nobunaga raised some 800 men in Nagoya Castle and advanced to Narumi: on the way, his force was intercepted about a mile north of the castle by some fifteen hundred men led by young Yamaguchi Kurojiro. Battle was fought on foot, in close quarters with cold steel and lasted from the Hour of the Serpent (around 10 a.m) to the Hour of the Horse (around noon). After two hours of intense fighting, Nobunaga lost some 30 samurai, and retreated the same day back to Nagoya, leaving contested lands in eastern Owari under Imagawa control.

== Aftermath ==
Nobunaga's first display as a battlefield commander impressed none, and further rebellions and attacks against Nobunaga were soon to follow, as his neighbors and relatives were trying to exploit his youth and presumed weakness for their benefit.

== Literature ==
- Chaplin, Danny (2018). Sengoku Jidai. Nobunaga, Hideyoshi, and Ieyasu : three unifiers of Japan. Createspace Independent Publishing Platform. pp. 55–63. ISBN 978-1-9834-5020-4. OCLC 1111714915.
- Ōta, Gyūichi (2011). The chronicle of Lord Nobunaga. J. S. A. Elisonas, Jeroen Pieter Lamers. Leiden: Brill. p. 3. ISBN 978-90-04-20456-0. OCLC 743693801.
