= Komaru Castle =

Castle in Japan

Komaru Castle 小丸城
- Echizen, Fukui Prefecture, Japan
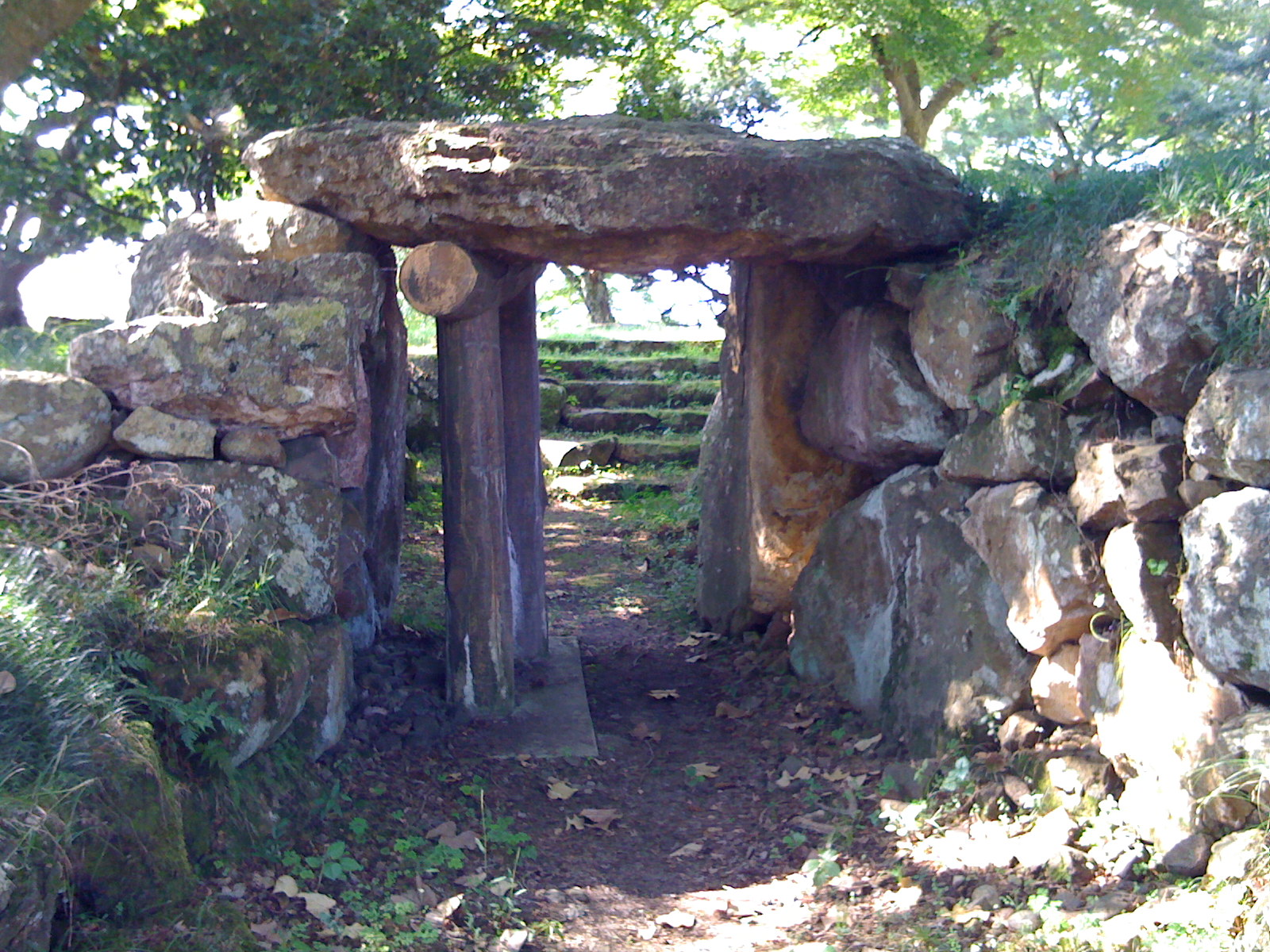
- Remains of Komaru Castle's main gate

Site information
- Type: Japanese castle
- Open to the public: yes
- Condition: Ruins

Location
- Location within Fukui Prefecture Location within Japan
- Coordinates: 35°53′53″N 136°13′49″E

Site history
- Built: 1575
- Built by: Sassa Narimasa
- In use: Sengoku period
- Demolished: 1581

Komaru Castle (小丸城, Komaru-jō) was a Japanese castle located in what is now the city of Echizen Fukui Prefecture, in the Hokuriku region of Japan. Built in the Sengoku period by Sassa Narimasa, the ruins are now a Fukui Prefectural Historic Site.

== History ==
Komaru Castle was established in 1575 Sassa Narimasa, one of Oda Nobunaga's generals. Along Maeda Toshiie and Fuwa Mitsuharu, he was charged with keeping the peace and suppressing the Ikkō-ikki in Echizen Province.

Komaru Castle was located on a small hill at the southern edge of the Fukui Plain. The inner bailey had stone ramparts and is thought to have had a donjon. A second and third bailey protected the inner citadel, and the whole was surrounded by moats and marsh. However, in 1581 Sassa Narimasa was awarded additional territories, and relocated to Etchū Province (current Toyama Prefecture), after leaving the unfinished Komaru Castle abandoned.

During excavations in 1932, the earthen foundations, part of the gate to the honmaru, the remains of the dry moat, a tower foundation, and some fragments of roof tiles were found. The roof tiles were of especial interest to historians, as an account was written on its reverse side about Maeda Toshiie's suppression of the Ikkō-ikki in Echizen by mass executions of followers.

== Literature ==
- Schmorleitz, Morton S. (1974). Castles in Japan. Tokyo: Charles E. Tuttle Co. pp. 144–145. ISBN 978-0-8048-1102-6.
- Motoo, Hinago (1986). Japanese Castles. Tokyo: Kodansha. p. 200 pages. ISBN 978-0-87011-766-4.
- Mitchelhill, Jennifer (2004). Castles of the Samurai: Power and Beauty. Tokyo: Kodansha. p. 112 pages. ISBN 978-4-7700-2954-6.
- Turnbull, Stephen (2003). Japanese Castles 1540-1640. Osprey Publishing. p. 64 pages. ISBN 978-1-84176-429-0.
