= List of cities in Toyama Prefecture by population =

The following list sorts all cities (including towns) in the Japanese prefecture of Toyama with a population of more than 5,000 according to the 2020 Census. As of October 1, 2020, 14 places fulfill this criterion and are listed here. This list refers only to the population of individual cities, towns and villages within their defined limits, which does not include other municipalities or suburban areas within urban agglomerations.

== List ==
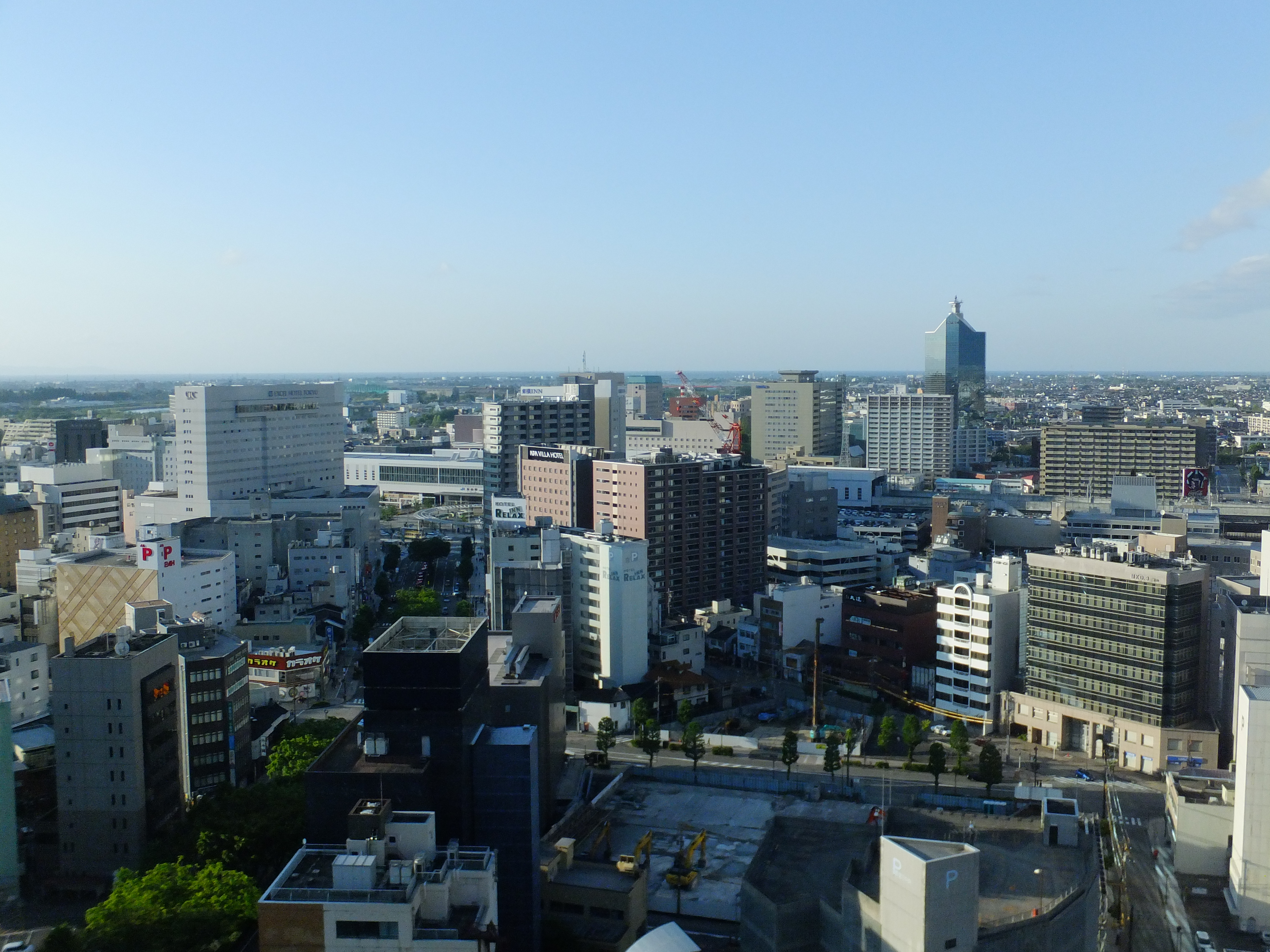
01.Toyama

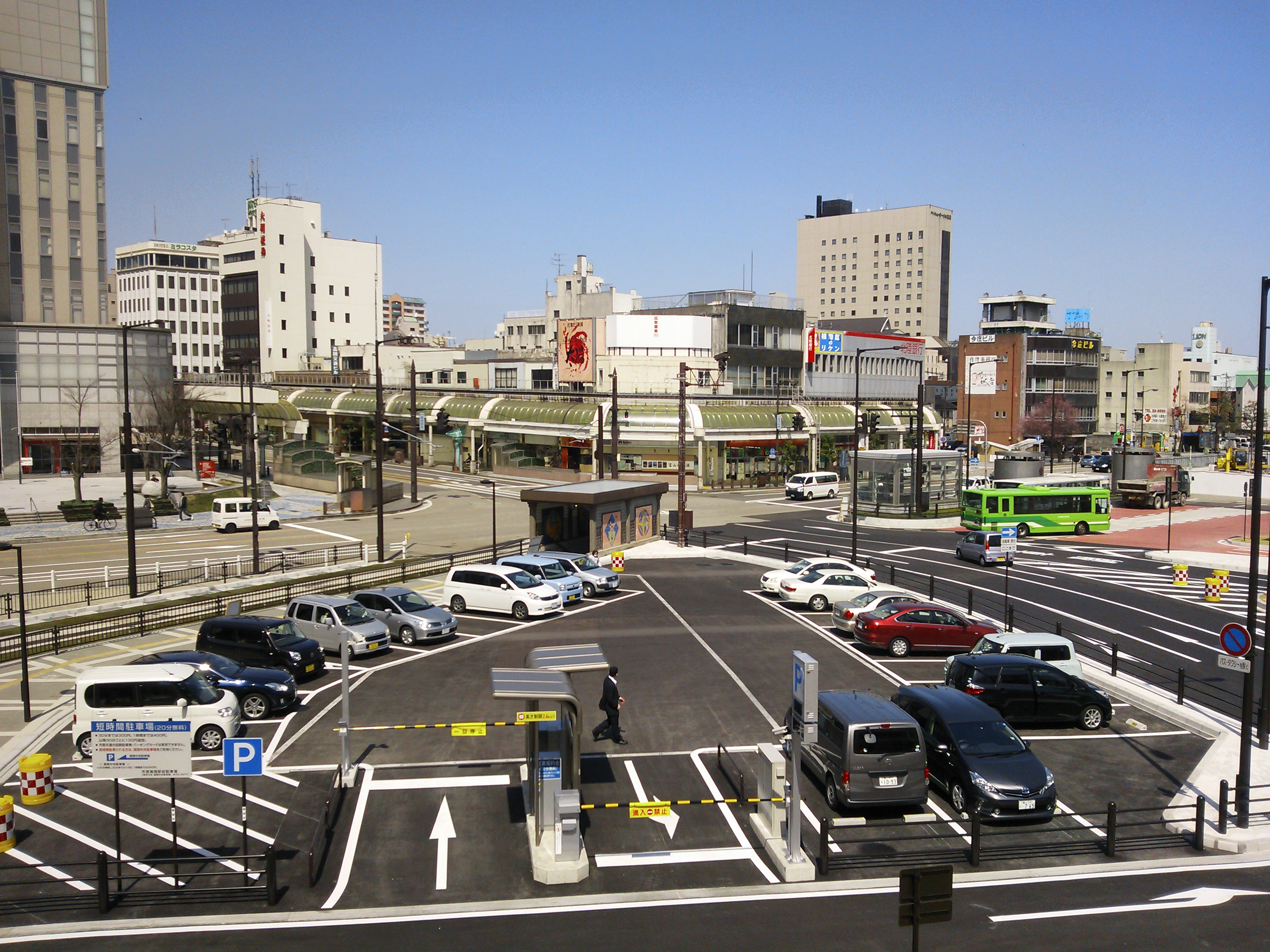
02.Takaoka

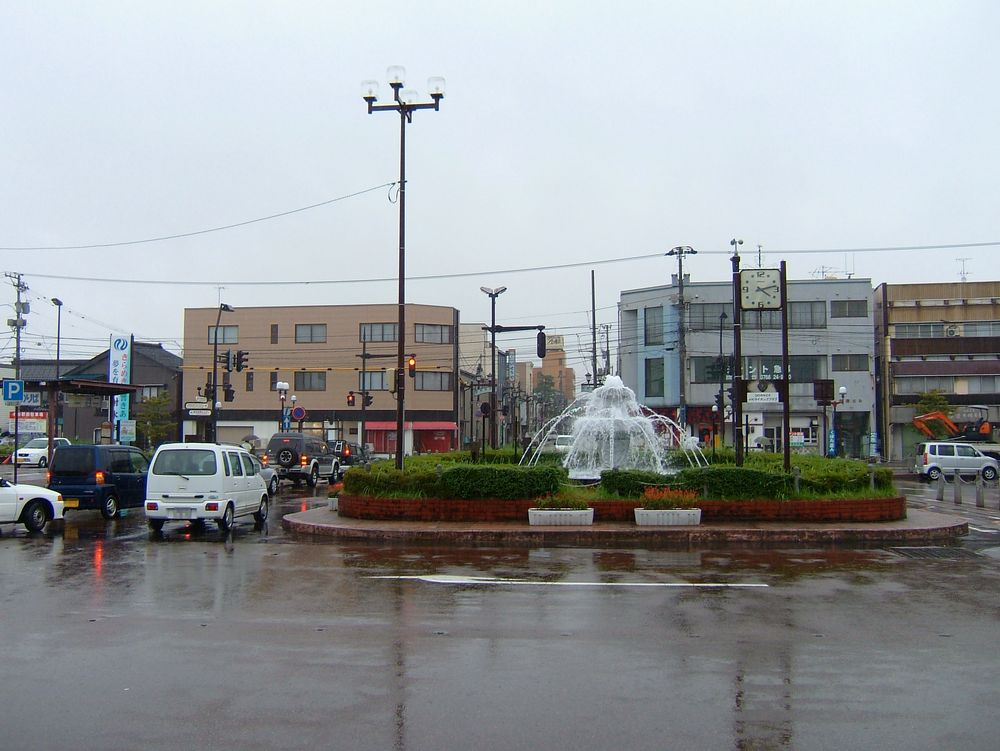
03.Imizu

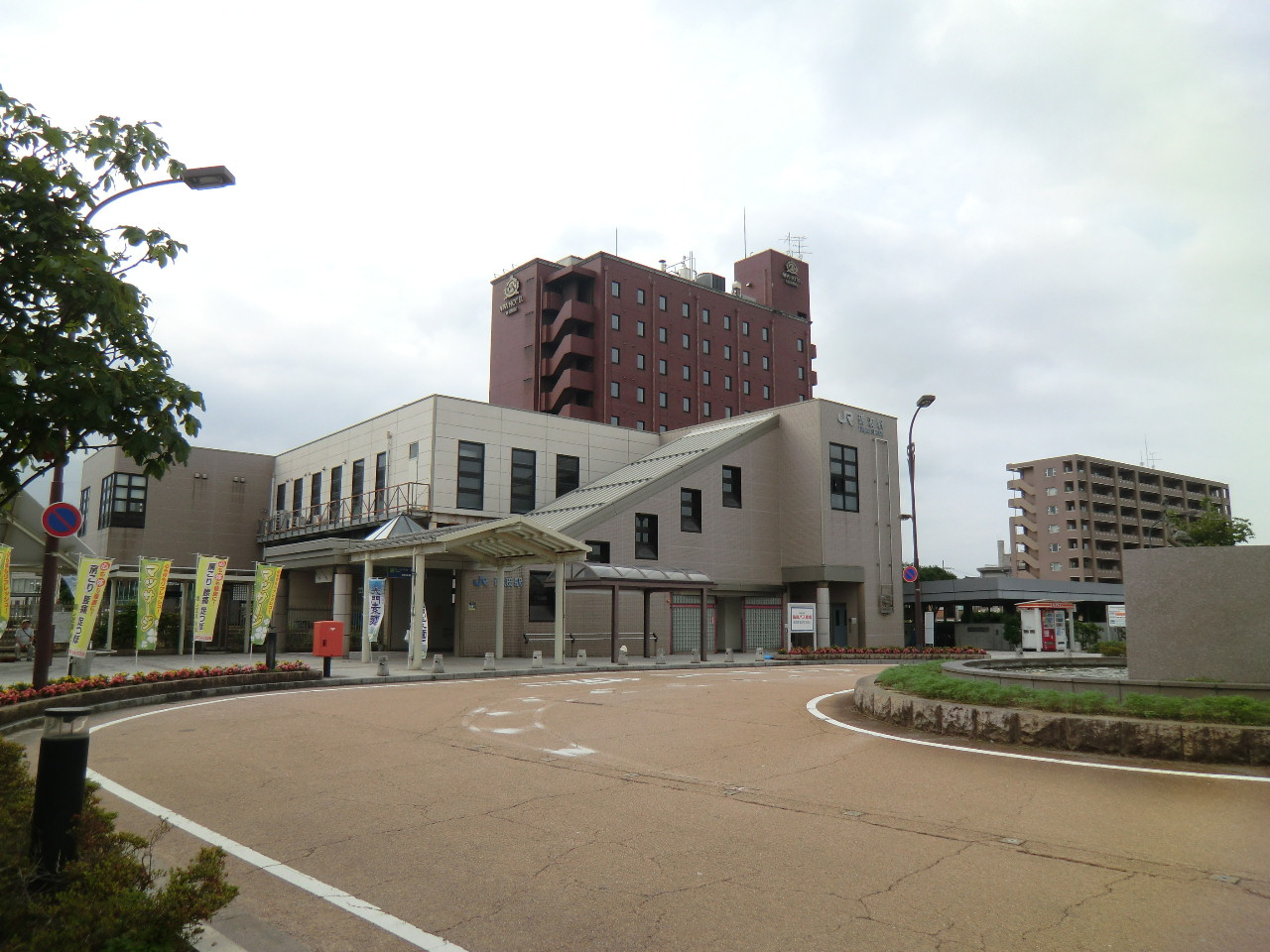
04.Tonami

The following table lists the 14 cities and towns in Toyama with a population of at least 5,000 on October 1, 2020, according to the 2020 Census. The table also gives an overview of the evolution of the population since the 1995 census.

Rank (2020)	Name	Status	2020	2015	2010	2005	2000	1995
1	Toyama	City	414,171	418,686	421,953	421,239	420,804	417,595
2	Takaoka	City	166,513	172,125	176,061	181,229	185,682	186,827
3	Imizu	City	90,807	92,308	93,588	94,209	93,503	92,981
4	Tonami	City	48,191	49,000	49,410	49,429	48,092	45,918
5	Nanto	City	47,976	51,327	54,724	58,140	60,182	62,965
6	Himi	City	43,995	47,992	51,726	54,495	56,680	58,786
7	Uozu	City	40,585	42,935	44,959	46,331	47,136	48,316
8	Kurobe	City	39,647	40,991	41,852	42,694	43,084	43,439
9	Namerikawa	City	32,379	32,755	33,676	34,002	33,363	31,841
10	Oyabe	City	29,018	30,399	32,067	33,533	34,625	35,785
11	Tateyama	Town	24,862	26,317	27,466	28,011	27,994	27,444
12	Nyūzen	Town	23,875	25,335	27,182	28,005	28,276	28,886
13	Kamiichi	Town	19,367	20,930	21,965	23,039	23,362	23,677
14	Asahi	Town	11,093	12,246	13,651	14,700	15,915	17,007
