= Kitanosho Castle =

- 北ノ庄城
- Fukui, Fukui, Japan
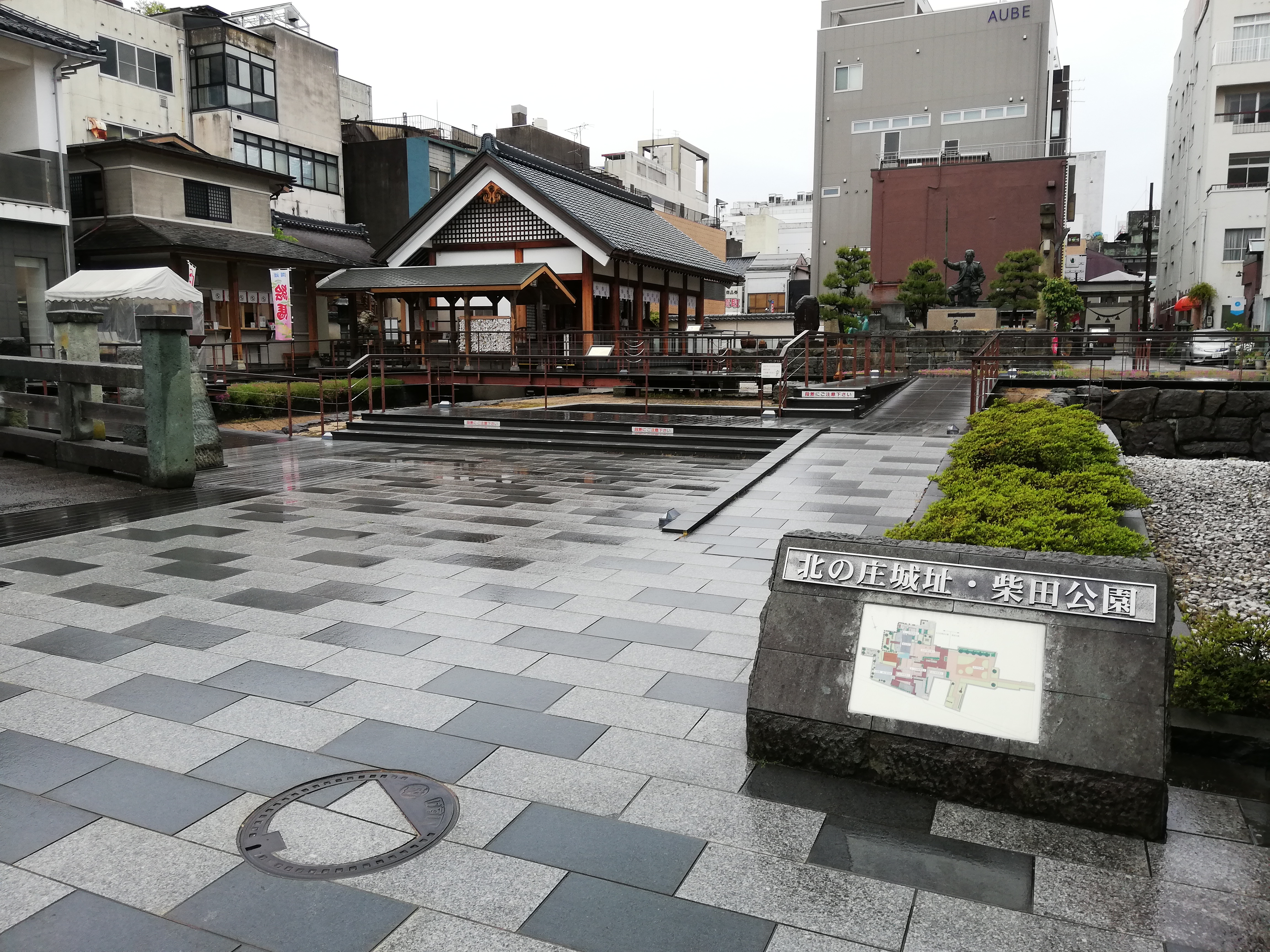
- Ruins of Kitanosho Castle found at Shibata Park

Site information
- Type: flatland-style Japanese castle

Location
- Location within Fukui Prefecture Location within Japan
- Coordinates: 36°03′37″N 136°13′11″E

Site history
- Built: 1575
- Built by: Shibata Katsuie
- Materials: wood, stone

Kitanosho Castle (北ノ庄城, Kitanoshō-jō) was a hirashiro (castle located on flatland). Its remains are located in current-day Fukui, Fukui Prefecture, Japan. As the castle lasted merely eight years, few records survive about it. It is known, though that it was built by Shibata Katsuie in 1575. Also, it appears that the tenshu (keep) was nine stories high, making it the largest of the time.

The castle was destroyed by fire in 1583, after Katsuie killed his wife, Oichi, and then committed seppuku, following defeat in the Battle of Shizugatake against Toyotomi Hideyoshi. A few stone foundations of the castle were uncovered in archaeological digs and are now open to the public.
