= Shiba clan =

Japanese clan

Shiba clan 斯波氏
- The emblem (mon) of the Shiba clan
- Home province: Mutsu; Owari; Echizen; Wakasa
- Parent house: Seiwa-Genji; Minamoto no Yasuuji
- Titles: Shugo
- Founder: Shiba Ieuji
- Final ruler: Shiba Yoshimune
- Founding year: Late 13th century
- Dissolution: 1572
- Ruled until: 1554, Yoshimune executed by Oda Nobutomo
- Cadet branches: Shibata clan (Echizen)

Shiba clan (斯波氏, Shiba-shi) was a Japanese clan.

== History ==
The Shiba clan descend from the Ashikaga Yasuuji and the Seiwa-Genji.

Shiba Ieuji was the son of Shiba Yasuuji who established the clan name at the end of the 13th century.

The Shiba were based in Mutsu Province, which occupied the north of Honshū. The clan also inherited the governorship of Owari Province in present-day Aichi Prefecture.

In the Kamakura period, the family was treated as a branch or cadet family of Ashikaga clan, which called themselves the Ashikaga family name, and it was not until the Muromachi period that Shiba was renamed as a family name.

Shiba Takatsune (1305–1367) expanded the role of the clan when he sided with Ashikaga Takauji (1305–1358) in the skirmishes against the Emperor Go-Daigo in 1335. With the establishment of the Ashikaga shogunate, founding shogun Takauji awarded the office of shugo governor of Echizen and Wakasa provinces to Takatsune.

Shiba Yoshimasa (1350–1410), son of Takatsune, held the office of kanrei (deputy of the shogun) from 1379 to 1397 during the Ashikaga shogunate. The office of kanrei was continued by his son Shiba Yoshishige (1371–1418) and grandson Shiba Yoshiatsu (1397–1434).

The clan held influence and territory in the provinces of Echizen Province and Owari Province to which they were governors during the Sengoku period.

The Shiba fell into factional dispute by the mid-15th century and were unable to make a transition to Sengoku-daimyō and lost Echizen to the Asakura in the 1470s. The feud within the Shiba clan and with other clans was one cause of the Ōnin War (1467–1477). The succession process was enacted by Asakura Toshikage, who took their power via usurpation. By the year 1550 the Shiba were represented by Shiba Yoshimune of Owari Province, a figurehead behind which the Yamato no kami branch of the Oda clan had ruled. His domain was Kiyosu Castle.

Shiba Yoshikane (d. 1572) was the son of Shiba Yoshimune. When Yoshimune was killed in the year 1554 by Oda Nobutomo the clan effectively came to an end.

== Popular culture ==
Shiba is a playable nation in Europa Universalis IV.
