= Matsukura Castle =

Matsukura Castle 松倉城
- Uozu, Toyama Prefecture, Japan
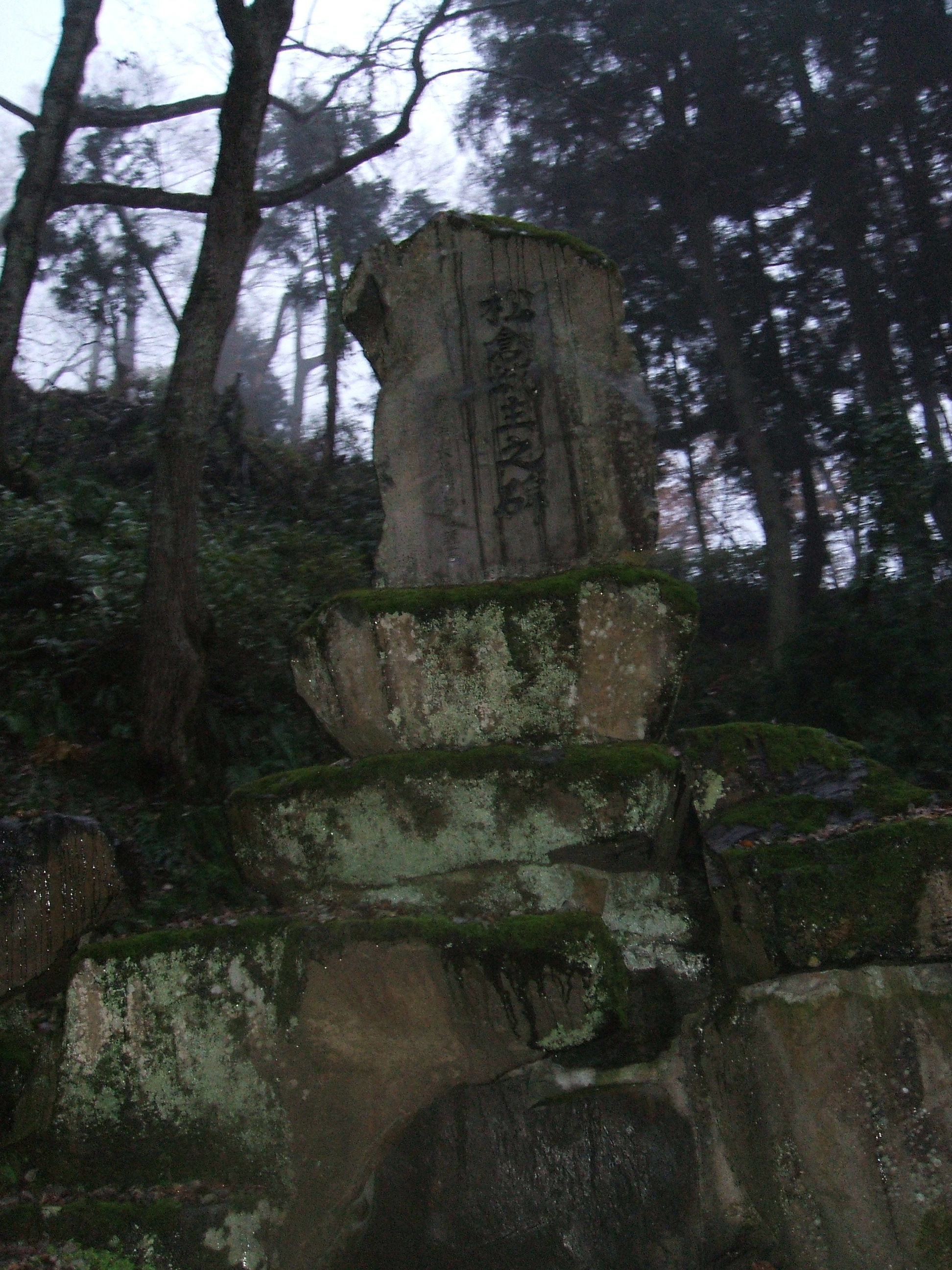
- Ruins of Matsukura Castle

Site information
- Type: yamajiro-style Japanese castle
- Open to the public: yes
- Condition: Ruins

Location
- Coordinates: 36°45′32″N 137°26′30″E

Site history
- Built: c.1335
- In use: Muromachi-Sengoku period
- Demolished: 1583

Matsukura Castle (松倉城, Matsukura-jō) was a Muromachi period yamajiro-style Japanese castle located in what is now the city of Uozu, Toyama Prefecture, in the Hokuriku region of Japan. It was one of the three major mountain-castles in Etchū Province, along with Matsuyama Castle in central Etchū and Moriyama Castle in western Etchū.

== Background ==
Matsukura Castle is located on Mount Matsumura, a 430.9 m (1,414 ft) peak on a ridge which a continuation of the Tateyama Mountain Range. The Uozu area is at the base of this ridge facing Toyama Bay, and was noted for its fishing industry. In addition, a gold mine also existed at Mount Mataukura, so the area was both strategically and economically important.

== Structure ==
Matsukura Castle occupies an L-shaped ridge running north and east. The inner bailey was a rectangular area approximately about 100 meter long by 40 meter wide, and contained a building which had a foundation 40 meter square, and was surrounded by a deep dry moat, which may have been a donjon. The inner bailey is protected by a second, third and fourth enclosure in line along the ridge, each separated by a dry moat. On the western ridge is a large flat area, which may have contained the residence of the castellan, and it is surrounded by smaller flat areas, which may have continued residences for major retainers, barracks and storehouses.

== History ==
Matsukura Castle was built around the year 1335 by the Bōmon clan, and later came under the control of the Momonoi clan. However, when the Momonoi suffered a crushing defeat at the Battle of Nagasawa in 1370, the Momonoi clan lost control of Matsukura Castle.

By the Nanboku-chō period, it became the main base of Shiina clan. The Shiina served as retainers of the Hatakeyama clan, and were appointed shugodai of Niikawa District of Etchū Province. Their main rivals were the Jinbō clan based at Toyama Castle. In the 1550s, the Jinbō clan gained ascendant over the Shiina; however, the Shiina made an alliance with Uesugi Kenshin, who captured Toyama Castle in 1570 after a fierce back-and-forth struggle. The leader of the Jinbō clan fled to Oda Nobunaga, and the Toyama area was awarded to one of Kenshin's retainers. Furious that they had been denied the Toyama are, the Shiina turned to Kenshin's rival, Takeda Shingen, for assistance in 1568. Kenshin then laid siege to Matsukura Castle, which held out for two years until 1571. Shine Yasutane escaped, and continued to fight the Uesugi until his death in 1576. Uesugi Kenshin rebuilt Matsukura Castle as a base of operations in Etchū Province and expanded his territory westward, coming into conflict with Oda Nobunaga. However, he fell ill and died in 1578, and the Oda army led by Shibata Katsuie overran Kaga and Noto Provinces by the end of 1580, and all of Etchū Province with the exception of the Uozu area by 1581. The Uesugi strengthened Matsukura Castle as part for their final defensive line.

During the Siege of Uozu in March 1582, Shibata Katsuie seized Uozu Castle after a three-month battle; however, the same day as his victory, Oda Nobunaga was assassinated in the Honnō-ji Incident and he was forced to withdraw before taking Matsukura Castle. In 1583, Sassa Narimasa returned as the head of a new army and Matsukura Castle was reduced.

The site of castle was abandoned sometime during the Keichō Era after the region became part of the holdings of Kaga Domain under the Maeda clan in the Edo period.

== Current ==
The castle is now only ruins, with some stone ramparts, dry moats and baileys. The castle has several hundred cherry trees growing around its grounds and plays host to local visitors during the Spring blossom season. During late May, the Sengoku Noroshi Festival is held on the grounds.

== Literature ==
- De Lange, William (2021). An Encyclopedia of Japanese Castles. Groningen: Toyo Press. pp. 600 pages. ISBN 978-9492722300.
- Schmorleitz, Morton S. (1974). Castles in Japan. Tokyo: Charles E. Tuttle Co. pp. 144–145. ISBN 0-8048-1102-4.
- Motoo, Hinago (1986). Japanese Castles. Tokyo: Kodansha. p. 200 pages. ISBN 0-87011-766-1.
- Mitchelhill, Jennifer (2004). Castles of the Samurai: Power and Beauty. Tokyo: Kodansha. p. 112 pages. ISBN 4-7700-2954-3.
- Turnbull, Stephen (2003). Japanese Castles 1540-1640. Osprey Publishing. p. 64 pages. ISBN 1-84176-429-9.
