= Tenshu =

Architectural element of Japanese castles

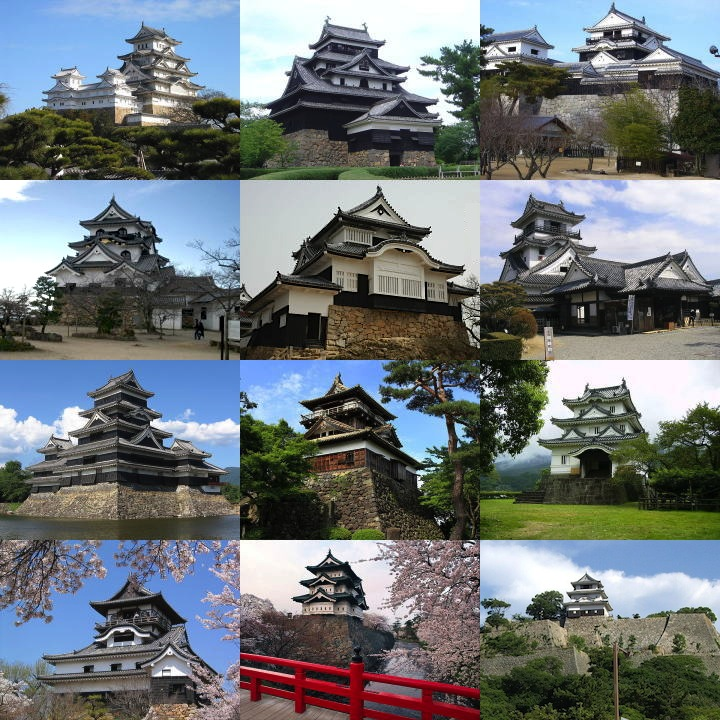
Twelve original tenshu of various castles

Tenshu (天守, 天主, 殿主, 殿守; also called tenshukaku, 天守閣) is an architectural typology found in Japanese castle complexes. They are easily identifiable as the highest tower within the castle. Common translations of tenshu include keep, main keep, or donjon.

Tenshu are characterized as typically timber-framed, having multiple stories, being seated on ishigaki (dry stone) foundations, and having individual floors delineated by surrounding tiled eaves. Further, tenshu are typically decorated with varying patterns of dormer gables (chidori-hafu), and are capped with hip-and-gabled roofs (irimoya-hafu) with shachihoko finials. Not all Japanese castles originally possessed tenshu (e.g. Sendai), many well-known castles have lost their tenshu (e.g. Nijō, Edo), many have had the tenshu rebuilt on multiple occasions (e.g. Nagoya, Osaka).

While both the term tenshu and the emergence of tenshu as a distinct architectural typology occurred in the 1560s and 1570s, the early relationship between the etymology and typology are not well understood.

== Etymology ==
The first known use of the term tenshu can be found in Yoshida Kanemi's journal, Kanemi kyōki, in the entry for the 24th day, 12th month of Genki 3 (27 January 1573):

明智為見廻下向坂本…城中天主作事以下悉披見也、驚目了…
Left the capital with Akechi [Mitsuhide] for Sakamoto for the purpose of a survey...in the center of [Sakamoto] castle, all saw that a tenshu (天主) was being built and were surprised...

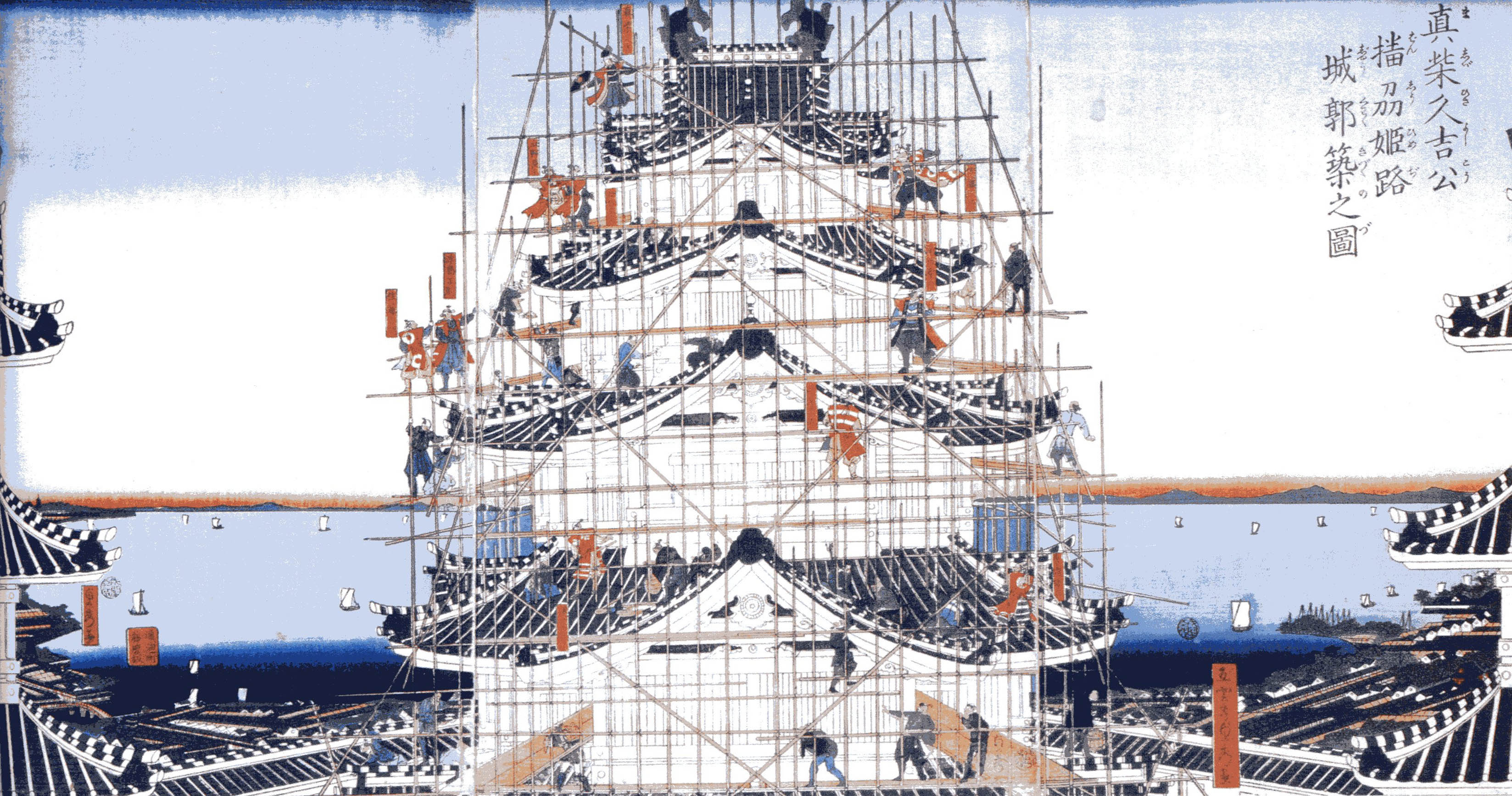
Rebuilding the tenshu at Himeji Castle in the early-17th century

Subsequent mentions in Kanemi kyōki and in other primary sources (such as Tennoji-ya kaki, Tamonin nikki, and in the letters of both Oda Nobunaga and Toyotomi Hideyoshi) during the 1570s reveal two points about the emergence of the term. First, the term was initially reserved for those castles under the direct control of Nobunaga or one of his vassals. These include Sakamoto Castle, Takatsuki Castle, Ashikaga Yoshiaki's Nijō Castle, Azuchi Castle, Itami Castle, Kitanosho Castle, Yamazaki Castle, Nagahama Castle, Ishigakiyama Ichiyoru Castle, Yodo Castle. Second, in its earliest uses there was no single standard for writing the term. The earliest variants include 天主 (lit. Master of Heaven), 殿主 (lit. Master of the Palace/Mansion), 殿守 (lit. Protector of the Palace/Mansion). The first known use of the current standard "天守" (lit. Protector of Heaven) appears in a letter dated the 27th day, 10th month of Tensho 7 (15 November 1579) issued by Nobunaga. While this way of writing tenshu gradually became the standard during the reign of Toyotomi Hideyoshi, the older manner of writing is preferred when discussing certain castles. One important example of this is the Azuchi Castle tenshu which is commonly referred as "天主".

== Earliest examples ==
The history of tenshu as an architectural typology seems to have begun earlier than the use of the term. Towers at Tamonyama Castle (built early 1560s) and Gifu Castle (built 1568) are known to have had the physical character of a tenshu, but are referred to in the primary record as yagura (turret, tower).

Azuchi Castle is often credited as the birthplace of the tenshu. Given the earliest usages of the name, however, it seems more likely that Azuchi played a key role in linking the typology and the name.

== Function ==
Unlike the other elements of Japanese castles, tenshu had little military function, but symbolised the power, wealth and extravagance of the castle's owner. Most Edo period castles were built during a period of peace lasting more than two centuries, but legends about earlier warfare suggested that once the outer defences of a castle had been breached, the defenders generally preferred to set fire to the remaining buildings and sally out to their deaths, rather than fight it out inside a fragile tenshu.

== Survival ==
These structures have proved vulnerable to fire, earthquake and war. Hundreds of them were destroyed or dismantled during the final stages of the unification wars of the Sengoku period at the turn of the 17th century. Others were demolished, collapsed from neglect or were allowed to burn down during the Meiji Restoration of the 1860s. Of nineteen tenshu that survived into the 20th century, six were destroyed during Allied air raids on Japan in the Second World War, and another, the donjon of Matsumae Castle, was destroyed by fire in 1949. However, many tenshu have been rebuilt in modern times; examples are Osaka castle in 1931, Hiroshima castle in 1958 and Ōzu Castle in 2004.
