= Siege of Toyama =

- Part of Toyotomi Hideyoshi's supremacy
Date	August 1585
Location	Etchu province 36°41′36″N 137°12′40″E
Result	Toyotomi victory

Belligerents
Toyotomi forces	Sassa Narimasa's forces

Commanders and leaders
Toyotomi Hideyoshi; Horio Yoshiharu; Maeda Toshinaga; Hachiya Yoritaka; Kanamori Nagachika	Sassa Narimasa

Strength
100,000 (speculation)	20,000 (speculation)
- Location within Toyama Prefecture Siege of Toyama (Japan)

The siege of Toyama was a battle during the Azuchi-Momoyama period (16th century) of Japan.

== History ==
During the late summer of August 1585, Toyotomi Hideyoshi had led his army of around 100,000 soldiers against Sassa Narimasa, a once former ally many years past.

During the siege of Toyama, Toyotomi's senior commander Maeda Toshinaga would play a very prominent role within the overall attack. In the end, Narimasa's defence was shattered, thus allowing Toyotomi supremacy over Etchu province.
