= Siege of Mitsuji =

1576 attack on the fortress in Osaka, Japan

- Part of the Sengoku period
Date	May 1576
Location	Mitsu-ji, Osaka 34°39′14″N 135°30′59″E
Result	Ikkō-ikki victory

Belligerents
Ikkō-ikki monks	forces of Oda Nobunaga

Commanders and leaders
Various/Unknown	Oda Nobunaga; Harada Naomasa †; Niwa Nagahide; Hashiba Hideyoshi; Takigawa Kazumasu; Inaba Ittetsu; Hachiya Yoritaka

Strength
15,000 sōhei	3,000 ashigaru
- Location within Osaka Prefecture Siege of Mitsuji (Japan)

The 1576 siege of Mitsuji (Japanese: 三津寺砦の戦い) was part of the eleven-year Ishiyama Hongan-ji War. The Ikkō-ikki, a group of warrior monks and peasants, controlled the fortress and stood as one of the primary obstacles to Oda Nobunaga's bid for power.

In May 1576, Nobunaga personally took part in an attack on the fortress. He led a number of ashigaru (foot soldiers) in pushing back the Ikki garrison to their inner gates. Nobunaga suffered a bullet wound to his leg. However, Nobunaga lost one of his generals, Harada Naomasa.
