= Shiba Yoshimune =

Japanese clan leader and governor

Shiba Yoshimune (斯波 義統; 1513 - August 10, 1554) was the final head of the Shiba clan and lived during the latter half of the Sengoku period of Feudal Japan. Nominally, Yoshimune was the governor (shugo) of Owari province and resided at Kiyosu castle. Though he was governor of Owari, the head of the Iwakura Oda clan and the deputy governor (shugodai) of Yoshimune, Oda Nobutomo, used him as a puppet ruler. Following the death of Oda Nobuhide in the year 1551 and Oda Nobunaga's appointment to heir of his late father's position, Nobutomo, who was of the opposite family, planned to assassinate the heir. Yoshimune learned of the assassination plot and betrayed Nobutomo, reporting it to Nobunaga. However, Nobutomo discovered the betrayal of Yoshimune and had him killed. Regardless, Nobunaga was successful in evading assassination and would later assault Kiyosu castle, killing Nobutomo.

== See also ==
- Shiba clan
