= Toyama Castle =

Building in Toyama Prefecture, Japan

- 富山城
- Toyama, Toyama Prefecture, Japan
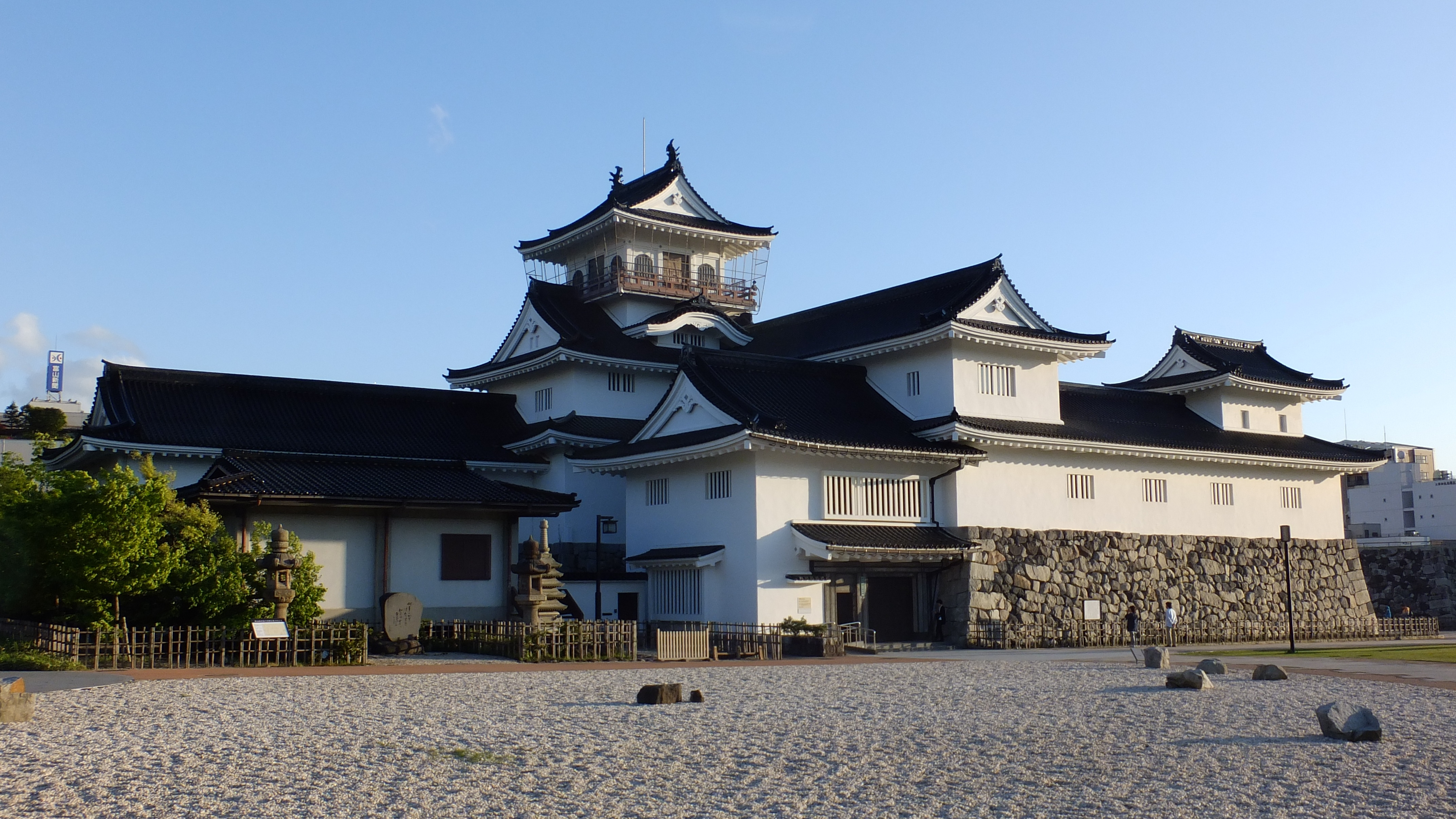
- Reconstructed main keep of Toyama Castle

Site information
- Type: flatland-style Japanese castle
- Open to the public: Yes
- Condition: Reconstructed

Location
- Location within Toyama Prefecture Location within Japan
- Coordinates: 36.6933°N 137.211°E

Site history
- Built: 1543
- In use: Sengoku-Edo period
- Demolished: 1871

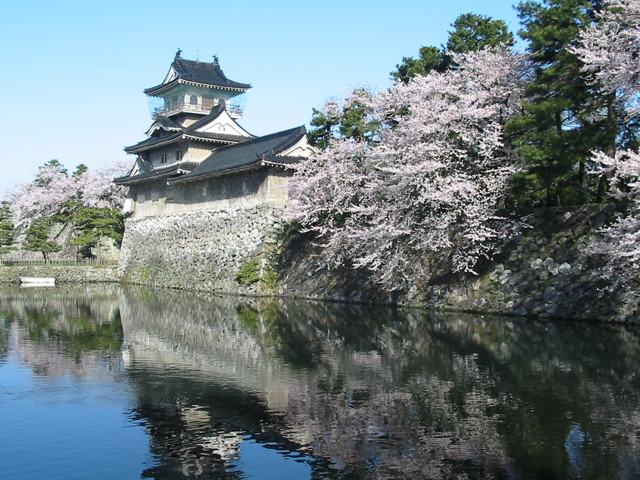
Toyama Castle moat

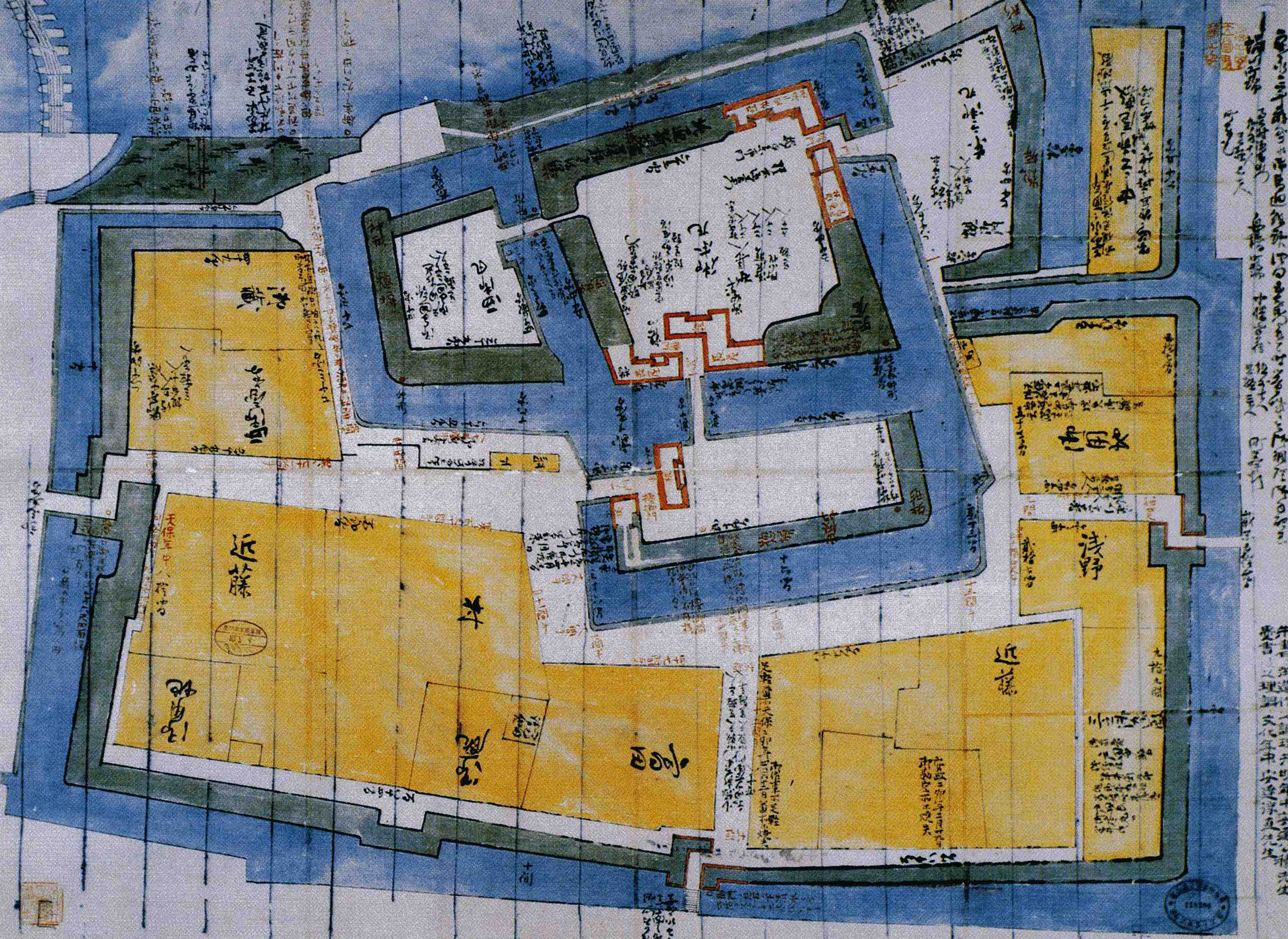
Layout map of Toyama Castle

Toyama Castle (富山城, Toyama-jō) is a flatland-style Japanese castle located in the city of Toyama, Toyama Prefecture, in the Hokuriku region of Japan. It is also called Azumi Castle (安住城 Azumi-jō). Built in 1543, the castle and its surrounding land is maintained by the government of Japan as a public park.

== Background ==
Toyama Castle is located at the center of modern current Toyama city. The surrounding area is roughly in the geographic center of Etchū Province and is a wide plain with a number of large rivers. A fortification was initially erected on this location in 1543 on the banks of the Jinzū River by the local Jinbō clan, who governed western Etchū Province as retainers of the Hatakeyama clan. Eastern Etchū Province was governed by their rivals, the Shiina clan, who were also retainers of the Hatakeyama. As the Hatakeyama waned in power and influence in the 15th century, the two clans waged a constant war for dominance over Etchū, with the Ikkō-ikki helping play one side against the other.

== History ==
In the 1550s, the Jinbō clan overwhelmed the Shiina; however, the Shiina made an alliance with Uesugi Kenshin, who captured Toyama Castle in 1570 after a fierce back-and-forth struggle. The leader of the Jinbō clan fled to Oda Nobunaga. The Uesugi plan placed Kojima Motoshige, a former retainer of the Jinbō, in charge of the castle as castellan, and he suppressed an attack by the Ikkō-ikki in 1571. Due to a plot by Takeda Shingen, the Shiina then revolted against Kenshin, but were defeated. After Kenshin's death, Nobunaga extended his power into the region, placing Jinbō Nagatsumi back in charge of Toyama Castle in 1578. However, due a revolt by his retainers Jinbō Nagatsumi lost control of Toyama Castle in 1581. Nobunaga was unforgiving of this incompetence, and installed his general Sassa Narimasa in his place. The Jinbō clan then disappears from history (with the major exception of the place name, Jinbōchō, Tokyo after a surviving clan member who entered the service of Tokugawa Ieyasu). Under Sassa Narimasa, the castle was greatly expanded in size, and new moats and towers were added. Narimasa also began a series of flood control works which gradually transformed the area surrounding the castle from a marsh to rich rice lands.

After Nobunaga's assassination in the Honnoji Incident of 1585, there was a falling out between Sassa Narimasa and Toyotomi Hideyoshi. After defeating Shibata Katsuie at the Battle of Shizugatake, Hideyoshi gradually extended his control over the Hokuriku region and placed his general Maeda Toshiie in Kaga Province. Narimasa responded by fortifying his border with Kaga and by making a pre-emptive attack against the Maeda at Suemori Castle, but was defeated. In August 1585, Hideyoshi invaded Etchū Province with more than 100,000 soldiers and besieged Toyama castle, which surrendered after only one week. Hideyoshi granted the castle to the Maeda clan.

Following the establishment of the Tokugawa shogunate, the Maeda clan were confirmed as daimyō of Kaga Domain, which included most of Etchū Province. Maeda Toshinaga, the son of Maeda Toshiba and second daimyō of Kaga Domain rebuilt the castle and temporarily used it as his retirement home until much of it burned down in 1609. His grandson, Maeda Toshitsugu was awarded a 100,000 koku holding in Etchū Province in 1639, the forming Toyama Domain; however, initially his fief did not include Toyama Castle. Unable to raise funds to build his own castle, in 1659 he reached an agreement with Kaga Domain to exchange some of holdings for Toyama Castle and the surrounding lands. In 1661, he received permission from the Tokugawa shogunate to rebuild the castle and to lay out a new castle town. His descendants ruled over Toyama from here until the Meiji Restoration. Many of the structures of the castle and its rampant were destroyed by the 1858 Hietsu earthquake, and most of what survived was destroyed by order of the new Meiji government in 1871.

== Current ==
After the remaining structures of the castle were removed, the Toyama Prefectural office was built on site of the inner bailey. This building burned down in 1899, was reconstructed in 1900 and burned down again in 1933. The castle site became a park, and was used for many public rallies prior to, and during, the Pacific War. The castle site was also ground zero for the Toyama Air Raid of August 2, 1945. A faux reproduction of the donjon of Toyama Castle was built in 1954 in ferro-concrete, and houses the Toyama Local History Museum (富山市郷土博物館) and the Sato Memorial Art Museum (富山市佐藤記念美術館), noted for its collection of utensils for tea ceremonies and antiques. The only original structures of the castle which have survived are one gate (the Chiyoda Gate (千歳御門) and discontinuous portions of the original moats and stoneworks.

The castle was listed as one of the Continued Top 100 Japanese Castles in 2017.

== Literature ==
- De Lange, William (2021). An Encyclopedia of Japanese Castles. Groningen: Toyo Press. pp. 600 pages. ISBN 978-9492722300.
- Schmorleitz, Morton S. (1974). Castles in Japan. Tokyo: Charles E. Tuttle Co. pp. 144–145. ISBN 0-8048-1102-4.
- Motoo, Hinago (1986). Japanese Castles. Tokyo: Kodansha. p. 200 pages. ISBN 0-87011-766-1.
- Mitchelhill, Jennifer (2004). Castles of the Samurai: Power and Beauty. Tokyo: Kodansha. p. 112 pages. ISBN 4-7700-2954-3.
- Turnbull, Stephen (2003). Japanese Castles 1540-1640. Osprey Publishing. p. 64 pages. ISBN 1-84176-429-9.
