= Shibata Katsuie =

Japanese samurai and military commander (1522–1583)

- 柴田 勝家
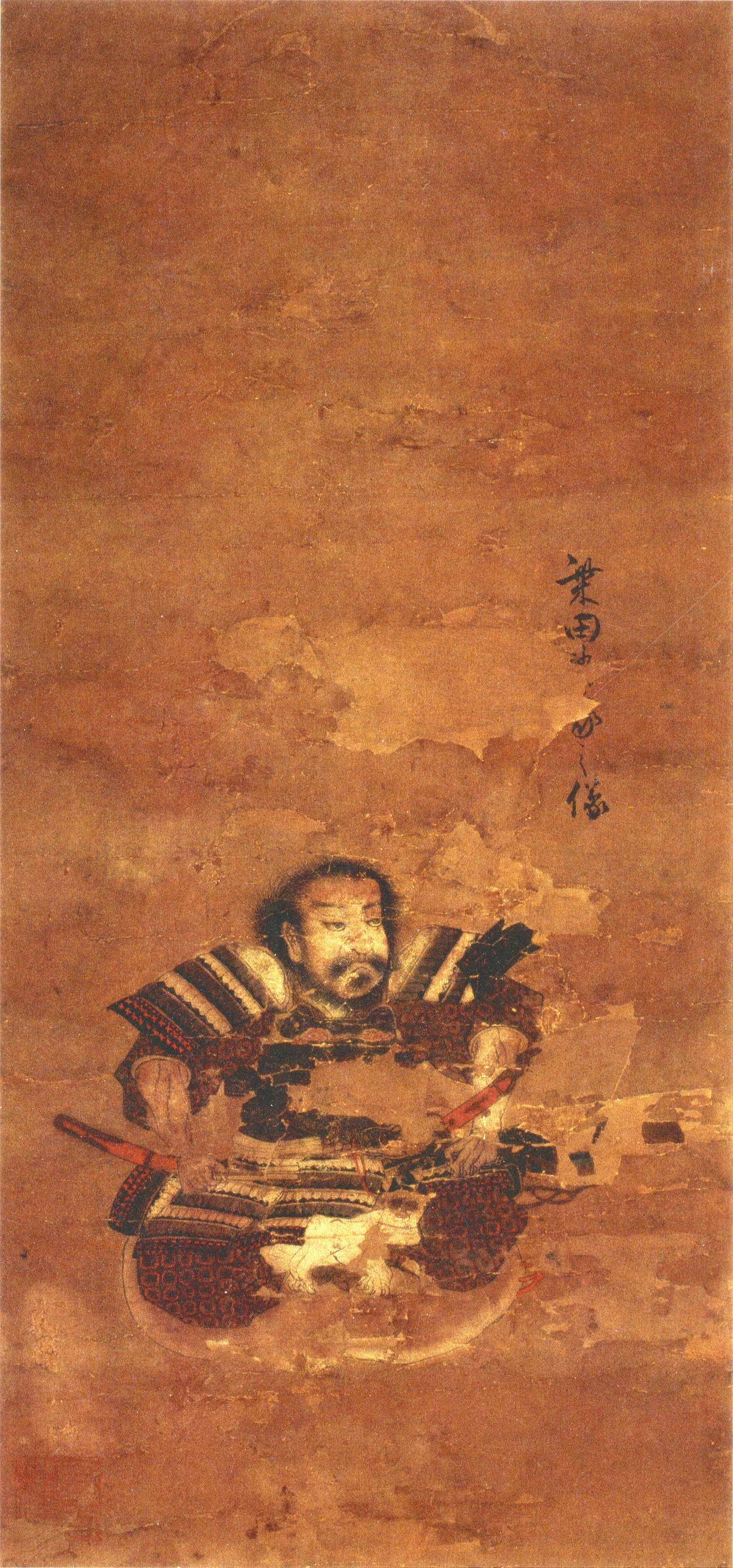

Lord of Tsuruga
- In office 1575–1583
- Succeeded by: Hachiya Yoritaka

Lord of Kitanosho Castle
- In office 1575–1583

Personal details
- Born: 1522 Kamiyashiro, Nagoya, Owari Province
- Died: June 14, 1583 (aged 60–61) Kitanosho Castle, Echizen Province
- Spouse: Oichi
- Children: Shibata Katsutoyo (adopted son); Shibata Katsumasa (adopted son); Yodo-dono (step daughter); Ohatsu (step daughter); Oeyo (step daughter)
- Relatives: Oda Nobunaga (brother-in-law)
- Nickname(s): "Oni Shibata" (demon shibata) "Gonroku"

Military service
- Allegiance: Oda clan
- Unit: Owari-Shibata clan
- Commands: Kitanosho Castle
- Battles/wars: Battle of Kanōguchi; 2nd Battle of Azukizaka; Battle of Kiyosu Castle; Battle of Ino; Battle of Okehazama; Siege of Shōryūji Castle; Siege of Chōkō-ji; Siege of Nagashima; Siege of Ichijōdani Castle; Echizen Campaign; Battle of Nagashino; Hokuriku Campaign; Battle of Tedorigawa; Kaga Campaign; Siege of Uozu; Battle of Shizugatake

Japanese name
- Kanji: 柴田 勝家
- Hiragana: しばた かついえ
Transcriptions
- Romanization: Shibata Katsuie

Shibata clan mon

Shibata Katsuie (柴田 勝家; 1522 – June 14, 1583) or Gonroku (権六) was a Japanese samurai and military commander during the Sengoku period. He was retainer of Oda Nobuhide. He served Oda Nobunaga as one of his trusted generals, was severely wounded in the 1571 first siege of Nagashima, but then fought in the 1575 Battle of Nagashino and 1577 Battle of Tedorigawa.

== Early life ==
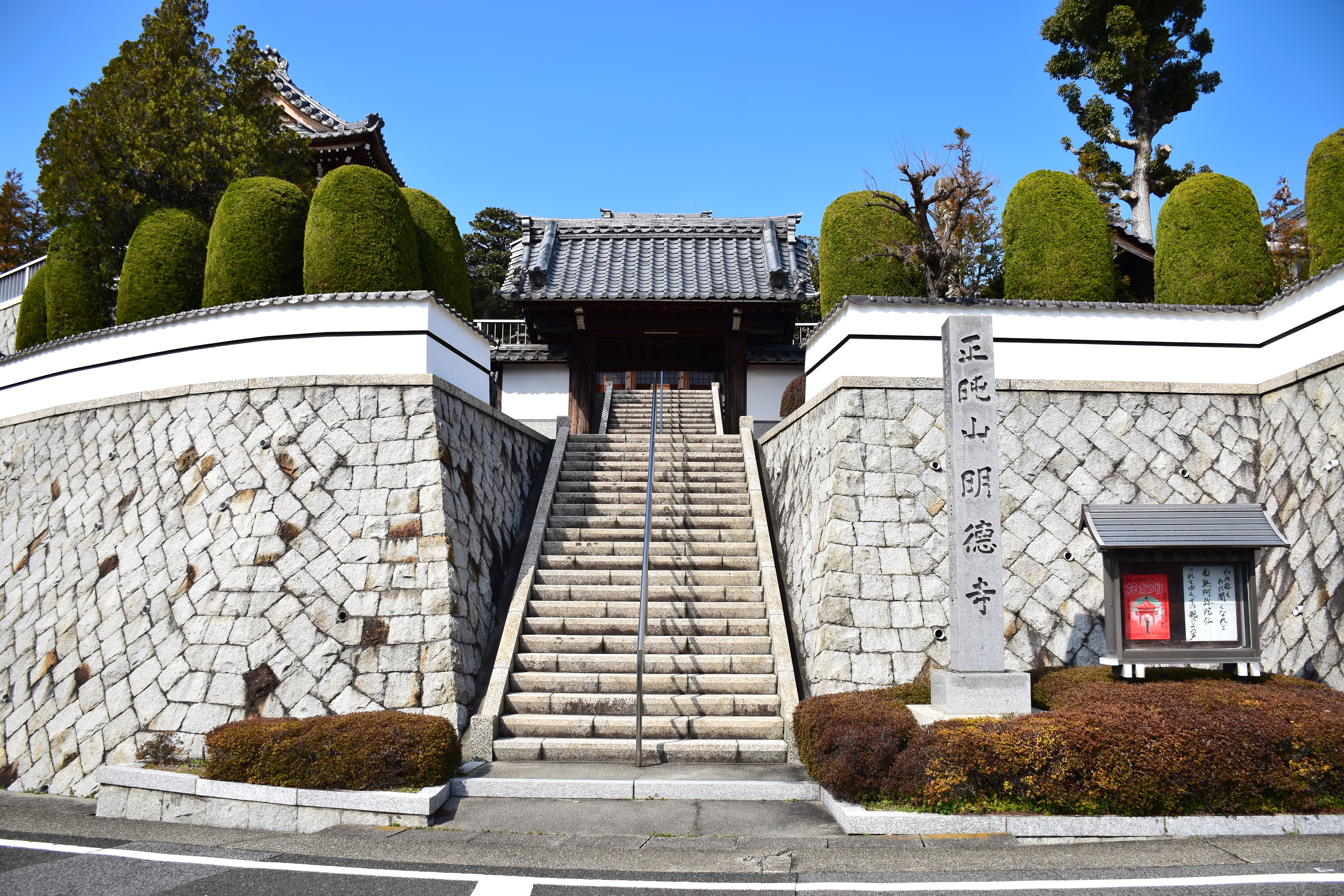
Myōtoku-ji (birthplace of Shibata Katsuie at Meitō-ku, Nagoya)

Katsuie was born in the village of Kamiyashiro (present-day Meitō-ku, Nagoya), a branch of the Shiba clan (who descended from the Ashikaga clan, and were the former suzerains of the Oda clan). Note the differences between Shibata (柴田), Shiba (斯波), and the Shibata clan of Echigo (新発田).

Katsuie was the retainer of Oda Nobuhide and later Oda Nobuyuki. In 1547, he fought at the Battle of Kanōguchi against the Saito clan and, in 1548, Katsuie took part in the second Battle of Azukizaka against Imagawa clan.

In 1556, when control of the Oda clan was contested, Katsuie initially supported his lord, Nobuyuki, against his elder brother Oda Nobunaga. Katsuie launched a coup d'état against Nobunaga. He was defeated at the Battle of Inō, and, in the aftermath, Nobunaga had his brother executed. But, impressed with the retainer's loyalty and bravery, Nobunaga spared Katsuie's life. Katsuie then pledged his services to Nobunaga, earning his praises.

In 1556, according to the records from the Tosho Gunkan, Sakai Tadatsugu defended Fukutani Castle, which was being besieged by 2,000 cavalry troops from the Oda Clan led by Shibata Katsuie. Tadatsugu managed to repel Katsuie's forces as he led a sallying force outside the castle and routed them.

== Service under Nobunaga ==
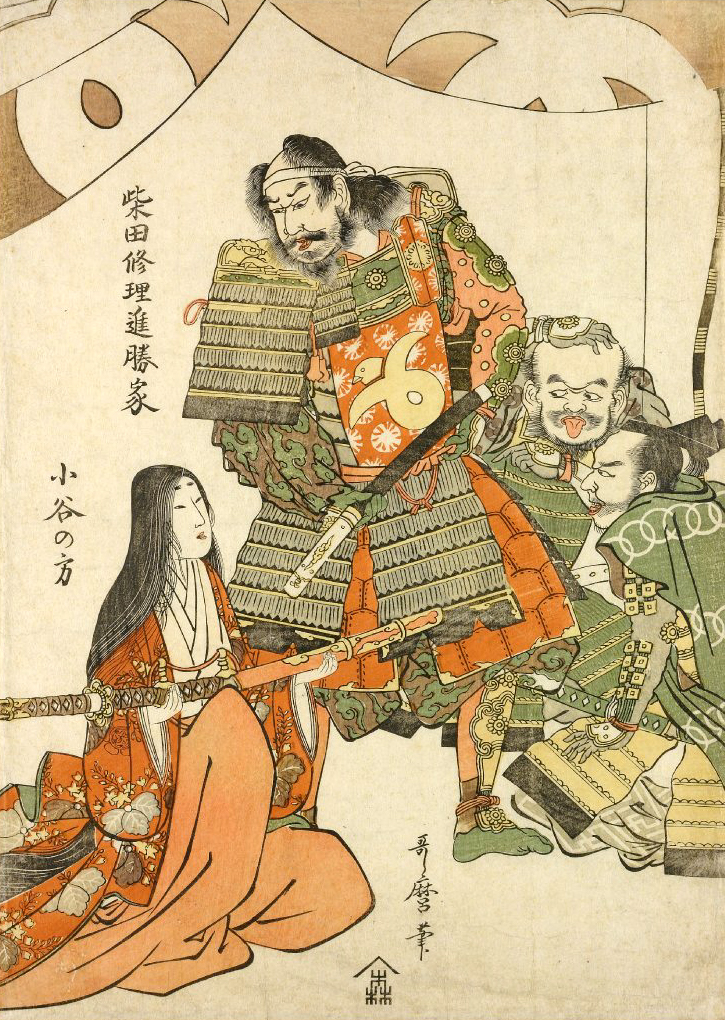
Shibata Katsuie utamarol

Due to his identity, he didn't hold any important position during the Battle of Okehazama against the Saitō clan. But he was ordered to be a Bugyō in 1565.

In late 1568, Katsuie was pardoned by Nobunaga, along with Hosokawa Fujitaka, Hachiya Yoritaka, Mori Yoshinari and Sakai Masahisa attacked Iwanari Tomomichi at Shōryūji Castle.

In 1570, while the Oda–Tokugawa coalition fought at the Battle of Anegawa against the Asakura and Azai clans, Katsuie was at Chōkō-ji castle, under siege by 4,000 soldiers of the Rokkaku clan. Katsuie eventually won via an all-out attack, forcing the Rokkaku to retreat. This action, along with a series of brilliant victories, gained him renown as the "Oni Shibata", or "Demon Shibata".

In 1571, he fought in the first Siege of Nagashima and was severely wounded.

In 1573, when Shogun Ashikaga Yoshiaki, who was protected by the Mori clan, built an anti-Nobunaga network, Katsuie fought against Yoshiaki's forces in various places including Omi Province and Settsu Province as a powerful military commander of the Oda army. Later, He took part in the siege of Ichijodani Castle and also in the Second Siege of Nagashima right after that, but he pulled back again.

In 1574, he took part in the third Siege of Nagashima. He commanded the right wing among the three groups along with Sakuma Nobumori.

In 1575, he fought in the Battle of Nagashino against Takeda Katsuyori. He and Hashiba Hideyoshi protected the left flank.

In 1576, after gaining control of Echizen, he took command of Kitanosho Castle (Hokujō) and was ordered to conquer the Hokuriku region.

In 1577, Nobunaga sent an army led by Shibata Katsuie and some of his most experienced generals to reinforce Shigetsura from Noto province against Uesugi Kenshin at the Battle of Tedorigawa.

In 1580, he led an army, which included his general Sakuma Morimasa in a fight against the Kaga Ikko-ikki at Kanazawa Gobo.

In 1581, after controlling Noto, he began a campaign against Etchū Province along with Maeda Toshiie, Sassa Narimasa and Fuwa Mitsuharu.

=== Death of Nobunaga ===
In 1582, he and Sassa Narimasa successfully laid siege to Uozu and Matsukura Castle. In the meantime, Oda Nobunaga and his eldest son and heir, Nobutada, were killed in the Honnō-ji incident by the forces of his former retainer Akechi Mitsuhide.

== Death ==
Later in 1582, after the death of Nobunaga, in a meeting at Kiyosu Castle to determine Nobunaga's successor, Katsuie initially supported the choice of Samboshi, Nobunaga's grandson; but he later supported Oda Nobutaka, Nobunaga's third son, for whom Katsuie had performed the genpuku ritual. He then allied with Oda Nobutaka and Takigawa Kazumasu against Toyotomi Hideyoshi who was allied with Oda Nobukatsu. Tension quickly escalated between Hideyoshi and Katsuie, and the following year they clashed at the Battle of Shizugatake.

=== Battle of Shizugatake ===
In 1583, Katsuie sent his nephew Sakuma Morimasa to besiege Takayama Ukon and Nakagawa Kiyohide at Shizugatake. Morimasa ignored Shibata's orders to withdraw to Ōiwa and was captured and beheaded by Toyotomi Hideyoshi's returning forces. Katsuie was defeated and retreated back into Echizen, all the way to Kitanosho Castle, which was taken in 3 days.

During the siege, Katsuie implored his wife, Oichi, to take their daughters and leave, but she decided to stay and die with him, while letting their daughters escape. After setting fire to his castle, Katsuie committed seppuku.

His death poem was:

夏の夜の 夢路儚き 後の名を 雲井にあげよ 山不如

Natsu no yo no
yumeji hakanaki
ato no na o
kumoi ni ageyo
yamahototogisu

"Fleeting dream paths, In the summer night! O bird of the mountain, Carry my name beyond the clouds."

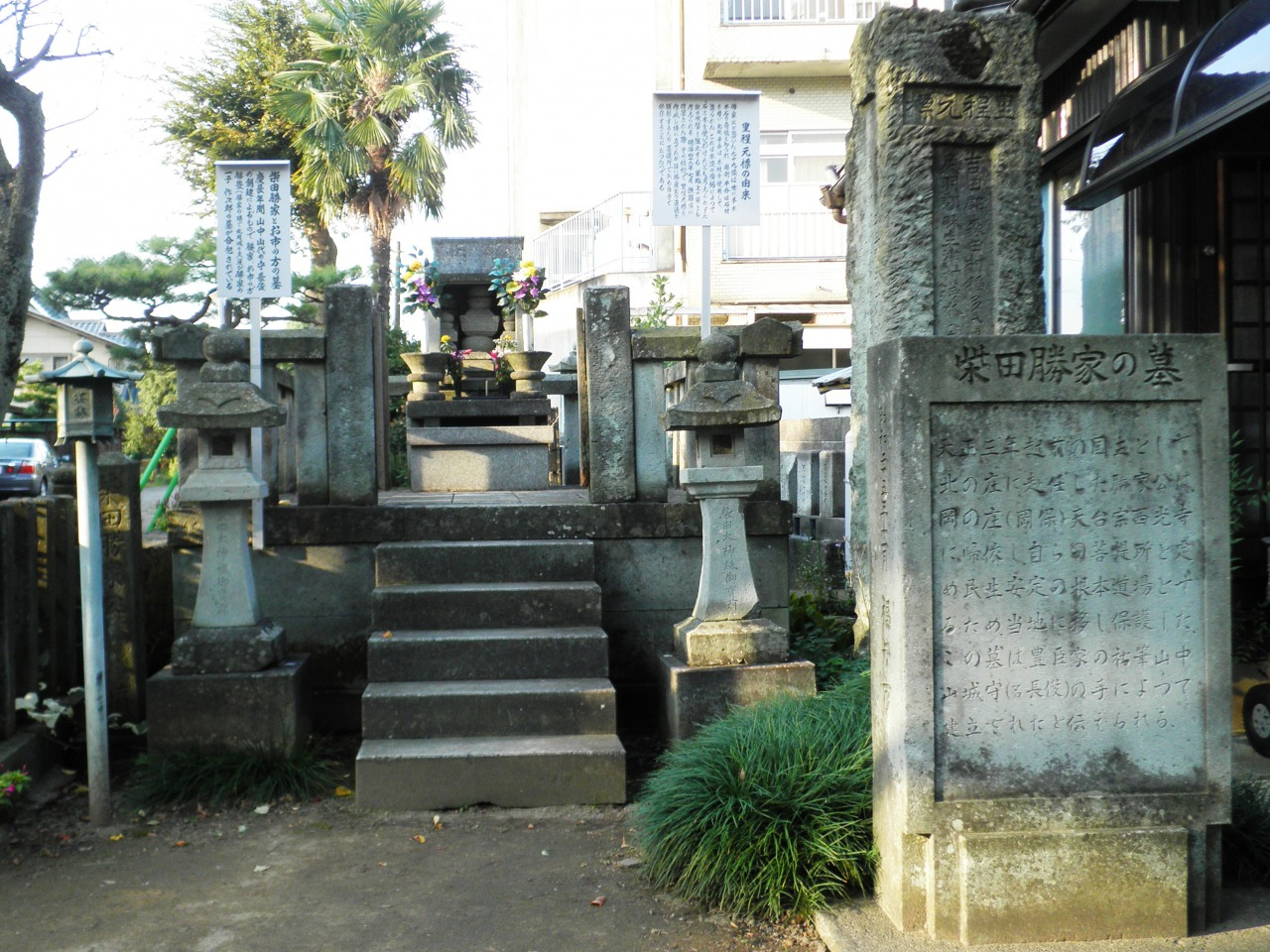
Grave of Shibata Katsuie

== Family ==
- Wife: Oichi (1547–1583)
- Step-daughters:
  - Yodo-dono (1569–1615)
  - Ohatsu (1570–1633)
  - Oeyo (1573–1626)
- Adopted sons:
  - Shibata Katsutoyo
  - Shibata Katsumasa

== In popular culture ==
Shibata Katsuie is a playable character in Koei Tecmo's Samurai Warriors 2: Empires and all subsequent Samurai Warriors, the Warriors Orochi games, and Sengoku Basara 4. He appears in Nioh 2 and Fate/Grand Order as a side character.

Shibata is a starting commander in the 2006 erotic video game Sengoku Rance

== See also ==
- The Kiyosu Conference (2013 film)
- Fukui Castle, residence of Katsuie
