= Sassa Narimasa =

Japanese Sengoku samurai

- 佐々 成政

Lord of Toyama
- In office 1581–1585
- Preceded by: Jinbō Nagatsumi
- Succeeded by: Maeda Toshiie

Lord of Komaru Castle
- In office 1575–1581

Personal details
- Born: February 6, 1536 Nishi-ku, Nagoya, Owari Province, Japan
- Died: July 7, 1588 (aged 52)
- Spouse(s): Jikoin (wife); Sayuri (concubine)
- Nickname: "Kura-no-suke"

Military service
- Allegiance: Oda clan Tokugawa clan Toyotomi clan
- Rank: Daimyo
- Commands: Komaru Castle; Toyama Castle
- Battles/wars: Siege of Inabayama; Siege of Kanegasaki; Battle of Anegawa; Echizen Campaign; Battle of Nagashino; Battle of Tedorigawa; Etchu Campaign; Battle of Arakawa; Siege of Uozu; Siege of Matsukura; Siege of Suemori; Siege of Toyama; Kyushu Campaign

Sassa Narimasa (佐々 成政; February 6, 1536 – July 7, 1588) was a Japanese samurai lord of the Sengoku through Azuchi–Momoyama periods. He entered Oda Nobunaga's service at the age of 14 and remained in his service throughout Nobunaga's rise to power. He was a member of the so-called Echizen Sanninshu (Echizen Triumvir) along with Maeda Toshiie and Fuwa Mitsuharu. He was also known as Kura-no-suke (内蔵助).

== Early life ==
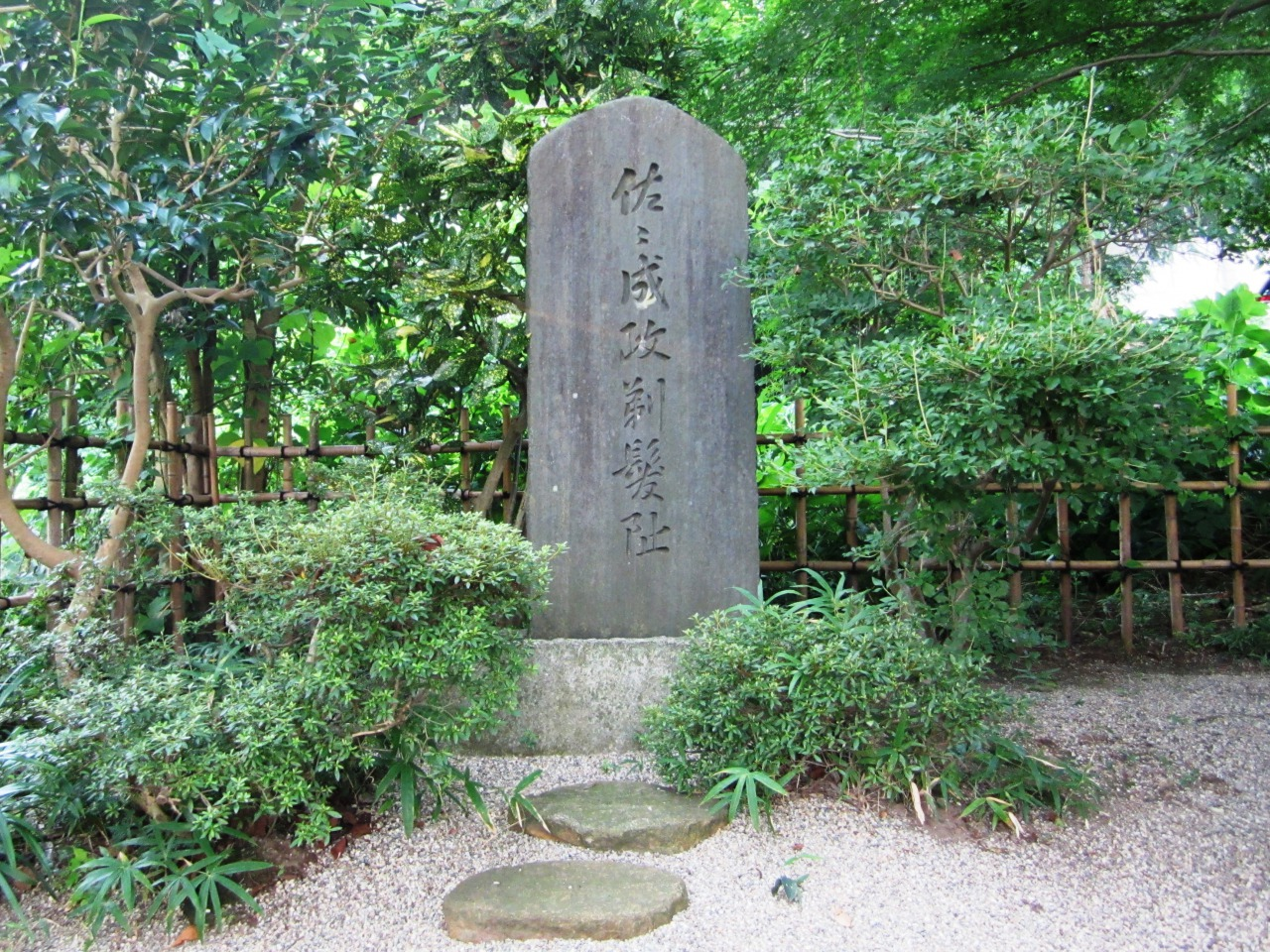
Sassa Narimasa's Tonsure Monument

Sassa Narimasa was born to Sassa Morimasa in what is now Nishi-ku, Nagoya (situated in contemporary Aichi District, Owari Province). He became a retainer of Oda Nobunaga in 1550. Narimasa was a military commander under Nobunaga, and the leader of Oda's Kurohoro-shū (黒母衣衆, lit. 'Black Mantle group'), a Military group with a black Horo (cloak) on their backs.

In 1560, after his brothers were killed in battle, Narimasa took over the family estate and became the lord of the Hirajo Castle.

== Military life ==
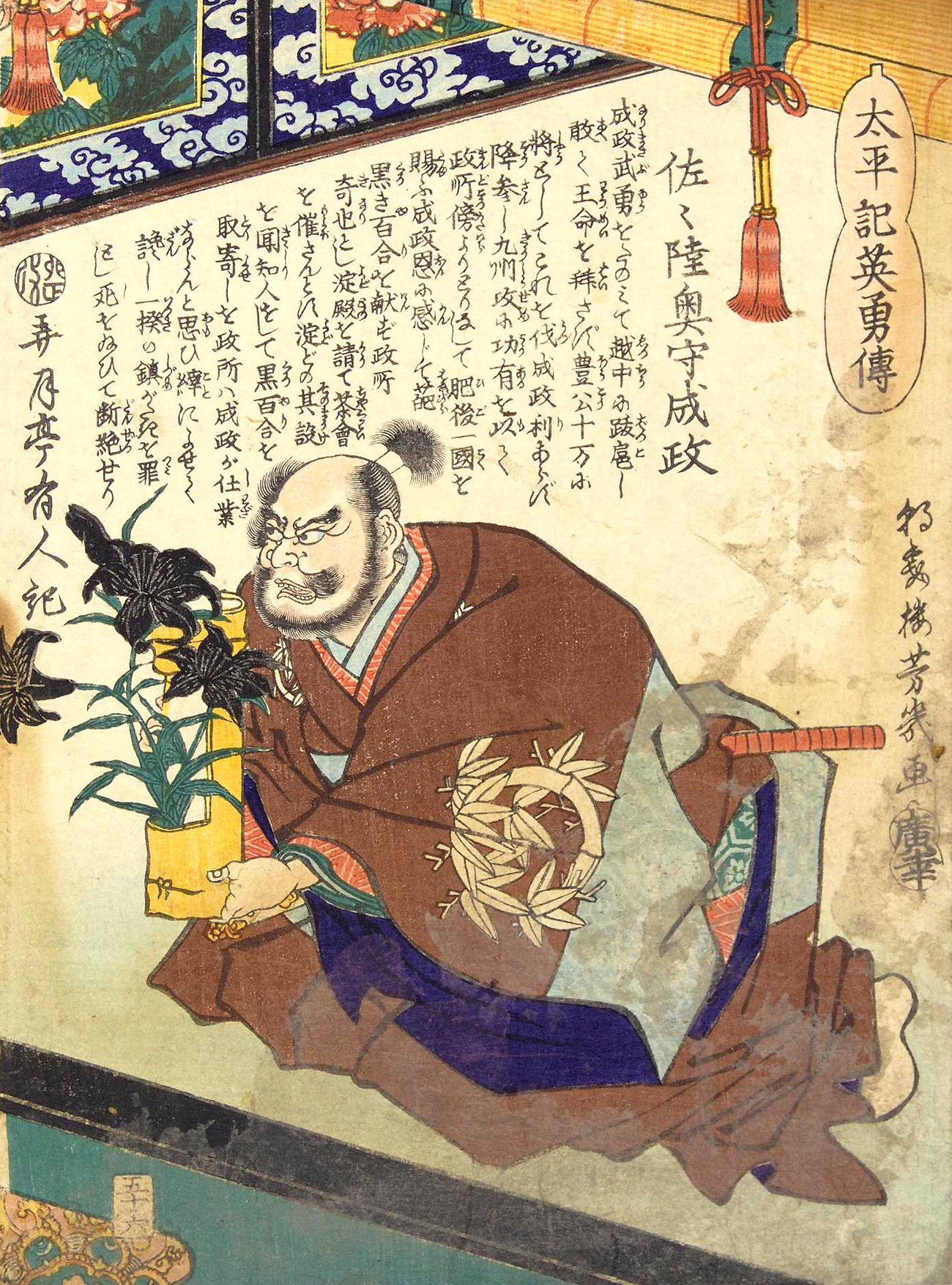
Picture of Sassa Narimasa by Utagawa Yoshiiku 1867

Narimasa served Nobunaga throughout the latter's career. He was noted for his ability to lead matchlock forces, a position he regularly held.

In 1567, he fought in the Siege of Inabayama Castle against Saito Tatsuoki from the Saitō clan.

In 1570, Narimasa participated in the Siege of Kanegasaki, leading a few armed forces of horse guards, and worked to support Hashiba Hideyoshi using a firearms troop. Later, he fought the Azai and Asakura clans in the Battle of Anegawa, where he was in the rear guard.

In 1575, Narimasa fought at the Battle of Nagashino against Takeda Katsuyori from Takeda clan. Later, he was given Komaru Castle in Echizen, where he had recently helped put down rioting Ikkō-ikki, and became a member of Echizen Sanninshu (Echizen Triumvir).

In 1577, he participated in the Battle of Tedorigawa against Uesugi Kenshin from the Uesugi clan.

In 1580, he was involved in stabilizing the Etchu Province, against an uprising of Ikko sect followers who supported Jimbo Nagazumi.

In 1581, he defended Toyama Castle against Kawada Nagayori in the Battle of Arakawa.

In 1582, he and Shibata Katsuie successfully laid siege to Uozu against Uesugi Kagekatsu from the Uesugi clan. He was granted Etchū Province as a reward for helping Shibata Katsuie fight the Uesugi clan.

In 1582, after Oda Nobunaga's death at Honnō-ji, at the Kiyosu meeting, Narimasa took the side of Shibata, but he could not participate in the battle of Shizugatake in 1583, since he could not leave Etchu where he was preparing for the attack of the Uesugi army at Matsukura Castle (Toyama Prefecture). After the death of Katsuie, Narimasa joined Tokugawa Ieyasu.

In 1584, during the battle of Komaki Nagakute, he and the Tokugawa alliance unsuccessfully challenged the Toyotomi force under Maeda Toshiie at the Siege of Suemori.

In 1585, he was defeated by Toyotomi Hideyoshi at Siege of Toyama, and later Narimasa submitted to Hideyoshi and his life was spared.

In 1587, after the Hideyoshi Kyushu Campaign, he was given a fief in Higo Province in Kyushu.

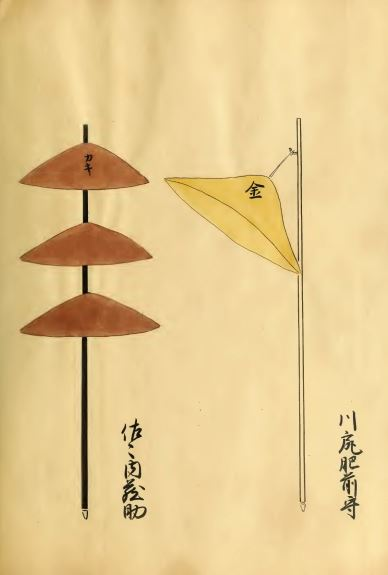
Sassa Narimasa (1536–1588) battle standard, left

== Death ==
In 1588, however, due to difficulties in suppressing a Higo Province local revolt, he committed suicide (seppuku) by Hideyoshi's instruction. The insurrection stemmed from survey of his province, which resulted in a change in the distance in which farmers transported their tax rice from 3 ri to 8 ri.

Later, after Higo Province was confiscated from Sassa Narimasa, land in Higo (roughly half of the province) and Kumamoto Castle was granted to Kato Kiyomasa.

== Family ==
- Father: Sassa Morimasa
- Siblings:
  - Sassa Magosuke (distinguished as one of the Seven Spears of Azukizaka. Died in Battle of Inabugahara against Oda Nobuyuki; 1556)
  - Sassa "Hayato no Kami" Masatsugu (distinguished as one of the Seven Spears of Azukizaka. Died in battle of Okehazama; 1560)
- Wife:
  - Haruhime
  - Jiko-in
- Concubine:
  - Sayuri
- Children:
  - Matsuchiyomaru (died in third siege of Nagashima in 1574).
  - Zuizen-in, wife of Narimasa's vassal, Matsubara Gorobe.
  - Teruko (d. 1630), married kuge Takatsukasa Nobufusa and they had a son, Nobuhisa and a daughter, Takako.
  - Mitsuhide-in, wife of Nobunaga's seventh son, Oda Nobutaka (Oda Nobutaka by Kyōun'in, later Toyotomi Takajuro (1576–1602) adopted by Toyotomi Hideyoshi)
  - Shoju-in, wife of Narimasa's vassal, Jinbo Ujioki.

== See also ==
- Battle of Nagashino
