= Oda Nobutomo =

Japanese warlord

Oda Nobutomo (織田 信友; ? – 10 May 1555) was a Japanese warlord during the Sengoku period. He was head of the Kiyosu Oda faction of the Oda clan, and ruled the four southern districts of Owari Province as shugodai.

== Life ==
After Oda Nobuhide died in 1551, Nobuhide's son Nobunaga was initially unable to assume control of the entire clan. Nobutomo challenged Nobunaga for control of Owari in the name of Owari's shugo, Shiba Yoshimune, technically his superior but in reality his puppet. After Yoshimune revealed to Nobunaga an assassination plot in 1554, Nobutomo had Yoshimune put to death. The next year, Nobunaga took Kiyosu Castle and captured Nobutomo, forcing him to commit suicide not long after.

== Family ==
- Father: Oda Tatsuhiro?
- Adopted Father: Oda Michikatsu
