= Kaga ikki =

Theocratic feudal confederacy in Kaga Province, Japan 1488–1582

- 1488–1582
- Location of Kaga Province in Japan
- Status: Confederation of the Ikkō-ikki
- Capital: none (1488-1546); Oyama Gobo (Kanazawa) (1546–1580)
- Common languages: Late Middle Japanese
- Religion: Jōdo Shinshū • Shinto
- Government: Feudal theocratic military confederation
- Monshu
  - 1457–1499: Rennyo
  - 1499–1525: Jitsunyo
  - 1525–1554: Shonyo
  - 1560–1592: Kennyo
- Shugo
  - 1488–1504: Togashi Yasutaka
  - 1504–1531: Togashi Taneyasu
- Legislature: Kanazawa Midō
  - District commanders: Hatamoto
  - Group members: Kumi
- Historical era: Sengoku
  - Togashi civil war: 1473
  - Kaga Rebellion: 1488
  - Kaga civil war: 1531
  - Establishment of Kanazawa Midō: 1546
  - Beginning of Ishiyama Hongan-ji War: 1570
  - Oda Nobunaga defeats the major opposition in Kaga: 1575
  - Oyama Gobo captured; End of Ishiyama Hongan-ji War: 1580
  - Final resistance in Kaga defeated: 1582
  - Maeda Toshiie conquers Kanazawa: 1583
- Currency: mon, ryō
Preceded by
Togashi clan
Succeeded by
Oda clan
Maeda clan
Toyotomi clan
- Today part of: Japan

The Kaga ikki, also known as The Peasants' Kingdom, was a theocratic feudal confederacy that emerged in Kaga Province (present-day southern Ishikawa Prefecture), Japan, during the late 15th and early 16th centuries. The Kaga ikki was a faction of the Ikkō-ikki, a gathering of peasant farmers, monks, priests, and jizamurai (upper-ranking peasant warriors) that espoused belief in Jōdo Shinshū Buddhism. Though nominally under the authority of the head abbot of the Hongan-ji, the Monshu, the ikkō-ikki proved difficult to control.

During the Ōnin War, the ikki in Kaga, with the approval of the Monshu Rennyo, helped restore Togashi Masachika to the position of shugo (military governor). However, by 1474 the ikki fell into conflict with Masachika, and in late 1487, they launched the Kaga Rebellion. Masachika was overthrown, and Togashi Yasutaka, his uncle, took his place as shugo. Under Yasutaka's son, Taneyasu, the Kaga ikki asserted more and more influence over the provincial government.

In 1531, a civil war erupted as two factions within the Kaga ikki vied for control. Renjun, a son of Rennyo, won the war, abolished the position of shugo, exiled Taneyasu, and established a much tighter Hongan-ji hegemony over the province. In 1546, the Kanazawa Midō was established as a governing body in Oyama Gobo, which would eventually grow into the present-day city of Kanazawa. The Midō oversaw very loosely organized committees of select warlords and priests, who in turn ruled over the local lords and village leaders. The Kaga ikki controlled Kaga until they were overrun by the forces of Oda Nobunaga in a series of campaigns lasting from 1573 to 1582.

== History ==
=== Emergence of the ikki in Kaga ===
==== Rise of the Ikkō-ikki ====
Throughout the 15th century in Japan, peasant revolts, known as ikki, increased in frequency. With the outbreak of the Ōnin War in 1467 and resultant chaos, they became even more commonplace. Many of the rebels embraced a militant offshoot of Jōdo Shinshū Buddhism known as Ikkō-shū. The religious leader Rennyo, eighth Monshu of the Hongan-ji school of Jōdo Shinshū, tried to distance himself from Ikkō-shū, but attracted many converts from the sect to the point were Ikkō-shū became synonymous with Jōdo Shinshū. Due to the violent tendencies of Ikkō-shū adherents, they became known as ikkō-ikki, literally "Ikkō-shū riots" or "Ikkō-shū league".

In 1471, Rennyo relocated from Kyoto to Yoshizaki in Echizen Province. Rennyo had attracted his largest following in Echizen and the bordering Kaga Province, a following which included not only low-class peasants but jizamurai, or kokujin, the emergent upper-ranking peasant warrior class.

==== Togashi civil war ====
In Kaga, a civil war had broken out between Togashi Masachika and Kochiyo Masachika for control of the position of shugo over the province. Kochiyo was victorious against his brother and drove him out of Kaga. When the Ōnin War began in 1467, Masachika sided with the Hosokawa clan, while Kochiyo sided with the Yamana. Kochiyo also patronized the Takada school of Jōdo Shinshū, a fierce rival of the Hongan-ji school of which Rennyo was head. Masachika, seeking to reclaim his land, reached out to the Ikkō-ikki and asked for their support. In exchange, he promised to end their religious persecution and lift them out of poverty. The priests in Yoshizaki agreed to aid Masachika, and Rennyo, though alarmed by the rebellious attitude of the rebels, tacitly rendered his support as well. Asakura Toshikage, the ruler of Echizen and ally of the Hosokawa, also lent his support. Kochiyo was defeated, and Masachika restored to power.

=== Kaga Rebellion ===
Despite having aided Togashi Masachika in his return to power, within a year the Ikkō-ikki of Kaga fell into conflict with him. Claiming that he failed to adequately deliver on his promises of economic reward, the Ikkō-ikki of Kaga revolted in 1474. Rennyo refused to support these rebellions, and the Ikkō-ikki were quickly defeated and forced to take refuge in neighboring Etchū. Shimotsuma Rensu, a ji-samurai from Echizen and an advisor to Rennyo, led another revolt, falsely claiming that Rennyo authorized his actions. This revolt also failed, and Rennyo excommunicated Rensu.

Though the early revolts in Kaga failed, unrest continued in the province, as the Ikkō-ikki would refuse to pay taxes and even seize tax revenues and land, despite Rennyo's admonitions of submission to the authorities. In 1487, possibly in an effort to secure a favor in the form of military aid, Masachika responded to shōgun Ashikaga Yoshihisa's call for military aid against Rokkaku Tokoyori in Ōmi Province. In Masachika's absence, the Ikkō-ikki launched a massive revolt, their forces numbering between one hundred thousand and two hundred thousand. Though Masachika quickly returned, the rebels, aided by several disgruntled former vassal families and nobility, overwhelmed him and trapped him in his castle, where he committed seppuku.

To replace Masachika as a shugo, the vassal families which opposed Masachika put forward his uncle, Yasutaka, who had previously been a shugo of the province. Ashikaga Yoshihisa was enraged by the rebellion and ordered Rennyo to excommunicate his followers in Kaga. However, Hosokawa Katsumoto, a personal friend and ally of Rennyo, brokered a deal which allowed Rennyo to merely reprimand the Kaga ikki.

=== Rule under Yasutaka and Taneyasu ===
After the overthrow of Togashi Masachika, Kaga became known as "the kingdom of peasants" and "hyakusho no motaru kuni " ("province ruled by peasants"). However, the Kaga ikki were content to live under the rule of Masachika's uncle, Yasutaka. When, in 1493, Hosokawa Masamoto deposed shōgun Ashikaga Yoshitane, Yasutaka and Yoshitane fled to Kaga. Yasutaka then led several campaigns in an effort to restore the shōgun, including two invasions of Echizen: one in 1494 and another in 1504. None of these campaigns featured ikki participation. However, after Yasutaka's death, the ikki asserted more control. They initiated two invasions, one in Etchū in 1506, and one in Echizen in 1508, both in support of ikki rebellions within those respective provinces. By the 1520s, the Kaga ikki had become the primary governmental faction within Kaga.

=== Kaga civil war ===
In 1531, the ikki control of Kaga was of such dominance that a conflict for leadership within the Hongan-ji embroiled the province in a civil war, often called the Daishō-Ikki, or Big League-Little League, war. A faction led by Renjun, a son of Rennyo, came to power in the Hongan-ji, and was hostile to the three main Kaga temples. In the resultant war, the three Kaga temples were backed by the Togashi clan, other powerful vassals, local Hongan-ji priests, and the ikki based in Echizen. Renjun was backed by many of the smaller temples and emerged victorious from the conflict when he brought in an Ikkō-Ikki army from Mikawa Province. Togashi Taneyasu was exiled, as were the other opposition leaders, and the position of shugo abolished.

=== Rule from Oyama Gobo ===
In the year immediately after the civil war, 1532, Rennyo led the Ikkō-ikki in a campaign to aid Hosokawa Harumoto against Miyoshi Motonaga. During that conflict, the Hongan-ji headquarters at Yamashina was burned down, and Rennyo established a new city in Settsu Province called Ishiyama Hongan-ji, the predecessor to modern-day Osaka. Due to the Kaga civil war and its aftermath, the Hongan-ji acquired large amounts of land in Kaga and thus exerted a powerful economic influence over the region. To manage its increased responsibilities, the Hongan-ji established the Kanazawa Midō, based in the city of Oyama Gobo, in 1546, to oversee Kaga's affairs from then onward. Oyama Gobo quickly grew to a population of 3,000–5,000, establishing the beginnings of what would become the present-day city of Kanazawa. Under the Midō, control of the province was centralized, to the point that rule under it resembled the rule of the daimyōs elsewhere in Japan.

=== Conquest by Oda Nobunaga ===
In 1570, daimyō Oda Nobunaga began a campaign against the Ikkō-ikki, besieging the Hongan-ji headquarters at Ishiyama Hongan-ji and attacking ikki strongholds throughout Japan. By 1573, forces led by Akechi Mitsuhide and Toyotomi Hideyoshi pushed through Echizen and into the southern portions of Kaga. A counter-attack by the Kaga ikki in 1574 halted this advance, causing Nobunaga to personally lead the assault into Kaga. In 1575, Nobunaga recaptured Echizen, and Mitsuhide and Hideyoshi again invaded Kaga, this time more rapidly, successively capturing the fortified temples of Daishōji, Hinoya, and Sakumi. By the end of the year, the southern half of Kaga was conquered, and in November of that year Nobunaga boasted to Date Terumune that he had "wiped out several tens of thousands of the villainous rabble in Echizen and Kaga."

Nobunaga granted Echizen to his general Shibata Katsuie, and in 1576 Katsuie's nephew Sakuma Morimasa penetrated deeper into Kaga, capturing Miyukizuka. In 1580, Morimasa destroyed the capital, Oyama Gobo. The same year, Ishiyama Hongan-ji surrendered. Despite the resistance of the Ikkō-Ikki being effectively suppressed, a few Kaga ikki fled the plains and entrenched themselves in the mountains at the fortified temples Torigoe and Futoge. Shibata Katsuie captured these strongholds in 1581, but the garrisons he established were over-run and the temples recaptured. Still in the year 1581, Katsuie and Sakuma Morimasa again recaptured the temples, killing all the Ikkō-ikki at the sites. Despite this, in 1582, resistance elements again recaptured Torigoe and Futoge. A third attack was mounted by Morimasa, and this time the final resistance elements were eliminated, ending the last vestiges of ikki rule in Kaga.

== Governance ==
The government structure of the Kaga ikki evolved over time. After the 1488 revolt, Togashi Masachika's uncle Togashi Yasutaka ruled as shugo, and little changed in the decentralized, feudalist structure of Kaga. Along with Yasutaka, several different factions also controlled Kaga. Three sons of Rennyo; Rengo, Renkō, and Rensei, headed the three Hongan-ji temples and led the ikki faction. Several former Masachika vassals, including the Mootori and Yamagawa, also held power. Historian David L. Davis explains that although 1488 is the conventional date given for the beginning of Ikki control in Kaga, it was only under Togashi Yasutaka's son Taneyasu that the ikki began asserting control over the government, becoming the dominant faction in the 1520s. He cites court documents from Kyoto to support his assertion: Until 1504 (when Yasutaka died), the shōgun and shōen considered Yasutaka the legitimate government; from 1504 to 1521, they were uncertain, and after 1521 they would send legal papers to the Hongan-ji office immediately outside of Kyoto. Likewise, military expeditions were initiated by Yasutaka during his tenure. For instance, he made several attempts to restore Ashikaga Yoshitane to power, which included two invasions of Echizen, in 1494 and 1504, respectively. However, after Yasutaka's death, the ikki in Kaga launched an invasion of Etchū in 1506 and Echizen in 1508, both times in support of ikki rebellions in those respective provinces, and both times without any contributions from the old vassal families.

In 1531, Renjun, a son of Rennyo, emerged victorious in the Kaga civil war and established a much tighter Hongan-ji hegemony over the province. The leaders of the opposition, including Togashi Taneyasu, were expelled from Kaga, though those who supported them were allowed to return. Without any central governing body, Kaga was consumed by political instability. The Asakura clan to the south and Uesugi to the north posed threats of invasion for Kaga, so the ji-samurai established a centralized authority at the Kanazawa Midō in Oyama Gobo. The Midō oversaw four district organizations of hatamoto – prominent local warlords. Each hatamoto commanded a group, kuni, of which there were roughly twenty in total. These kuni in turn ruled over regional groups of local warriors, priests, and the heads of village communes. The highest political organization of the ikki in Kaga was a committee of hatamoto, and the only permanent political body were the twenty kuni. Important matters would be settled at the meetings of the local hatamoto in consultation with the local Hongan-ji priests. However, these meetings were sporadic and held at the county, rather than provincial, level, and thus, according to Davis, would probably rarely have involved more than five hatamoto and one or two Hongan-ji priests. Kuni meetings were probably similar, with the exception that a hatamoto present at a kuni meeting would have held great respect.
