= Kaga Rebellion =

Revolt by the Ikkō-ikki in Kaga Province, Japan (late 1487–1488 CE)

- Part of the Sengoku period
- Location of Kaga Province in Japan
Date	1487–1488
Location	Kaga Province, Japan (later southern Ishikawa Prefecture)
Result	Ikkō-ikki victory
Territorial changes	Ikkō-ikki gain effective control of Kaga

Belligerents
Ikkō-ikki; Motoori clan Yamagawa clan Other disaffected vassals and nobility	Togashi clan

Commanders and leaders
Rengo; Renkō; Rensei and others	Togashi Masachika †

Strength
100,000–200,000	Unknown

The Kaga Rebellion or Chōkyō Uprising was a large-scale revolt in Kaga Province (present-day southern Ishikawa Prefecture), Japan, in late 1487 through 1488. Togashi Masachika, who ruled Kaga Province as shugo, had been restored to power in 1473 with aid from the Asakura clan as well as the Ikkō-ikki, a loose collection of lesser nobility, monks, and farmers. By 1474, however, the Ikkō-ikki grew discontent with Masachika, and launched some initial revolts, which were easily quelled. In 1487, when Masachika left on a military campaign, between 100,000 and 200,000 Ikkō-ikki revolted. Masachika returned with his army, but the Ikkō-ikki, backed by several disaffected vassal families, overwhelmed his army and surrounded him in his palace, where he committed seppuku. The former vassals of Masachika granted the position of shugo to Masachika's uncle Yasutaka, but over the next several decades, the Ikkō-ikki increased their political hold on the province, eventually abolishing the shugo. They effectively controlled Kaga for almost a century.

== Background and initial revolts ==
During the 15th century in Japan, peasant revolts, known as ikki, became much more commonplace. During the turmoil of the Ōnin War (1467–1477) and subsequent years, these rebellions increased in both frequency and success. Many of these rebels became known as Ikkō-ikki, a collection of peasant farmers, Buddhist monks, Shinto priests, and jizamurai (lesser nobles) who all espoused belief in the Jōdo Shinshū sect of Buddhism. Rennyo, the Hongan-ji abbot who led the Jōdo Shinshū movement, attracted a large following in Kaga and Echizen Province, but distanced himself from the political goals of the ikki, advocating violence only for self-defense or defense of one's religion.

During the mid-15th century, a civil war broke out among the Togashi clan over the position of shugo. Togashi Masachika had been driven out of Kaga by his younger brother, Kochiyo. When the Ōnin War broke out in 1467, Masachika sided with Hosokawa and Kochiyo with Yamana. In 1473, Masachika requested aid from Asakura Toshikaga, the lord of Echizen and ally of Hosokawa, as well as from the priests of Yoshizaki, who were associated with Rennyo. Masachika promised the ikki that if restored to power, he would lift his supporters out of their poverty. Further motivating the ikki to support Masachika were the religious policies of Kochiyo: Kochiyo patronized the Takada school of Jōdo Shinshū, a fierce rival to the Hongan-ji for control of the Shinshū sect, and persecuted followers of the Hongan-ji. Toshikaga pledged his support, as did the Yoshizaki priests, the latter prior to any approval from Rennyo. Rennyo eventually granted his approval to the actions of the Yoshizaki priests, and with Toshikaga providing military aid and the Ikkō-ikki rioting throughout Kaga, Masachika quickly overthrew his brother. But Ikkō-ikki support of Masachika was short-lived. By 1474, the Ikkō-ikki were in dispute with Masachika as they claimed that he did not fulfill his promises of economic reward, and they attempted a rebellion. Rennyo refused to support their actions and the rebels were quickly defeated and forced to take refuge in Etchū Province. In 1475, Shimotsuma Rensu, a disciple of Rennyo, falsely claimed that Rennyo supported a renewed uprising in Kaga. The revolt failed, and Rennyo excommunicated Rensu. Tiring of his efforts to restrain the unruly Ikkō-ikki, Rennyo left Yoshizaki for the capital region.

== 1488 revolt ==
Despite the previous revolts having been easily suppressed, unrest continued to simmer in Kaga under Masachika's governance. The Ikkō-ikki who remained in Kaga grew bolder, refusing to pay taxes and even seizing tax revenue and land, despite Rennyo's continued protestations. In 1487, Masachika left with a large army for Ōmi Province in response to a call for aid from shōgun Ashikaga Yoshihisa, who was attempting to suppress the robber baron Rokkaku Tokoyori. In Masachika's absence, the Ikkō-ikki, led by Rengo, Renkō, and Rensei, three sons of Rennyo, launched their revolt and between one hundred thousand and two hundred thousand members took up arms. Masachika quickly returned from his military expedition, and defeated the rebels in several battles. However, several vassal families, discontent with Masachika, joined with the rebels. The rebels cut off Masachika from reinforcements from his allies in the bordering Echizen, Etchū, and Noto Provinces, and besieged his castle. Masachika, trapped in a burning castle and faced with certain defeat, committed seppuku. In his place, the vassal families who rebelled against Masachika put forward his uncle and ex-shugo, Yasutaka, as a candidate to be the new shugo.

== Aftermath ==
Following the overthrow of Masachika, Kaga became known as "hyakusho no motaru kuni" ("the kingdom of peasants", or "province ruled by peasants"). Shōgun Yoshihisa, a friend and ally of Masachika, demanded that Rennyo excommunicate the Kaga ikki. However, Hosokawa Masamoto, an influential political figure who was also a close friend and patron of Rennyo, negotiated a deal which permitted Rennyo to merely reprimand the ikki while Masamoto would join the Hongan-ji. In Kaga, Togashi Yasutaka took power as shugo, ruling the province until his death in 1504. Afterward, under the rule of his son, Taneyasu, the ikki began to assert their influence over the vassal families that supported them in the uprising. The ikki soon split into rival political factions and initiated a series of political struggles which culminated in a civil war in 1531. The heads of the three predominant Hongan-ji temples in Kaga, as well as Taneyasu, were defeated when Renjun, a son of Rennyo, brought in Ikkō-ikki troops from Mikawa Province. Upon Renjun's victory, the office of shugo was abolished and the leaders of the opposition were exiled. The Ikkō-ikki would control Kaga until 1580, when forces loyal to Oda Nobunaga defeated them.
