= Togashi Masachika =

General and daimyō from Kaga Province, Japan

Togashi Masachika 富樫政親
- Shugo
- Reign: 1455–1488
- Successor: Togashi Yasutaka
- Died: 1488; Takao Castle, Kaga Province, Japan
- Family: Togashi family

Togashi Masachika (富樫政親, died 1488) was a general and daimyo in Japan during the Muromachi period. A member of the Togashi family, he ruled Kaga Province as shugo. When the Ōnin War broke out, Masachika sided with the Hosokawa clan, while his brother Kochiyo sided with the Yamana clan. With the support of the Asakura clan and the Ikkō-ikki, Masachika defeated his brother and was restored to power. However, the Ikkō-ikki fell into dispute with Masachika, rising up in two failed revolts in 1474 and 1475. In late 1487, while Masachika was away on a campaign to support Shogun Ashikaga Yoshihisa, the Ikkō-ikki launched a massive revolt. Masachika returned to quell the rebellion, but was overwhelmed and cut off from any aid from the neighboring provinces. Besieged in his burning castle, he committed seppuku in 1488.

== Campaigns in the Ōnin War ==
=== Togashi civil war ===
In 1467, a civil war between Hosokawa Katsumoto and Yamana Sōzen escalated into a nationwide conflict known as Ōnin War. Since 1445, Togashi Masachika had contended with resistance from the warriors of Kaga, and low-level rural violence was probably frequent in the province. With the outbreak of the Ōnin War, the unrest in Kaga escalated into a civil war among the Togashi clan between Masachika and his younger brother Kochiyo over the position of shugo. Masachika sided with Hosokawa and Kochiyo with Yamana. Masachika was driven out of Kaga by Kochiyo in 1473. Masachika requested aid from Asakura Toshikaga, the lord of Echizen and ally of Hosokawa, as well as from the priests of Yoshizaki, who followed Rennyo, the leader of the Hongan-ji school of Jōdo Shinshū Buddhism. Masachika's brother Kochiyo patronized the Takada school of Jōdo Shinshū, a fierce rival to the Hongan-ji for control of the Shinshū sect, and persecuted followers of the Hongan-ji. Masachika also promised the ikki that if restored to power, he would alleviate their poverty. Toshikaga pledged his support, as did the Yoshizaki priests, and so with Toshikaga providing military aid and the Ikkō-ikki rioting throughout Kaga, Masachika quickly overthrew his brother.

== Kaga Rebellion ==
Ikki support for Masachika dissolved almost immediately. By 1474, the Ikkō-ikki argued that Masachika did not fulfill his promises of relieving their poverty, and they attempted a rebellion. Rennyo, however, refused to endorse this action. The rebels were quickly defeated, and many took refuge in Etchū Province. In 1475, Shimotsuma Rensu, a disciple of Rennyo, falsely claimed that Rennyo supported a renewed uprising in Kaga. The revolt was suppressed, and Rennyo excommunicated Rensu. Despite the failure of these revolts, unrest continued to simmer in Kaga. The remnant Ikkō-ikki in Kaga refused to pay taxes and even seized tax revenue and land, despite the protests of their alleged leader Rennyo. In 1487, Masachika responded to a request for military aid from shōgun Ashikaga Yoshihisa, who was attempting to suppress the robber baron Rokkaku Tokoyori in Ōmi Province. In the absence of Masachika and his army, Rengo, Renkō, and Rensei, three sons of Rennyo, instigated a revolt. Between one hundred thousand and two hundred thousand members rebelled against Masachika. Masachika quickly returned from his military expedition, and at first was successful at defeating the ikki armies. However, several vassal families, including the Motoori and Yamagawa, then joined with the rebels. The rebels cut off Masachika from potential reinforcement by his allies in Echizen, Etchū, and Noto Provinces, and then trapped Masachika in his castle. Besieged in a burning castle and faced with certain defeat, Masachika committed seppuku. In his place, the vassal families who rebelled against Masachika put forward his uncle and ex-shugo, Yasutaka, as a candidate to be the new shugo. Rather than administer a government directly, the ikki preferred to delegate someone else as a minimal ruler. Historian David L. Davis theorizes that the rebellion against Masachika was because "he was attempting to end the general anarchy of Kaga and force the province to submit to a measure of discipline."
