= Asakura Toshikage =

Japanese daimyo

- 朝倉敏景
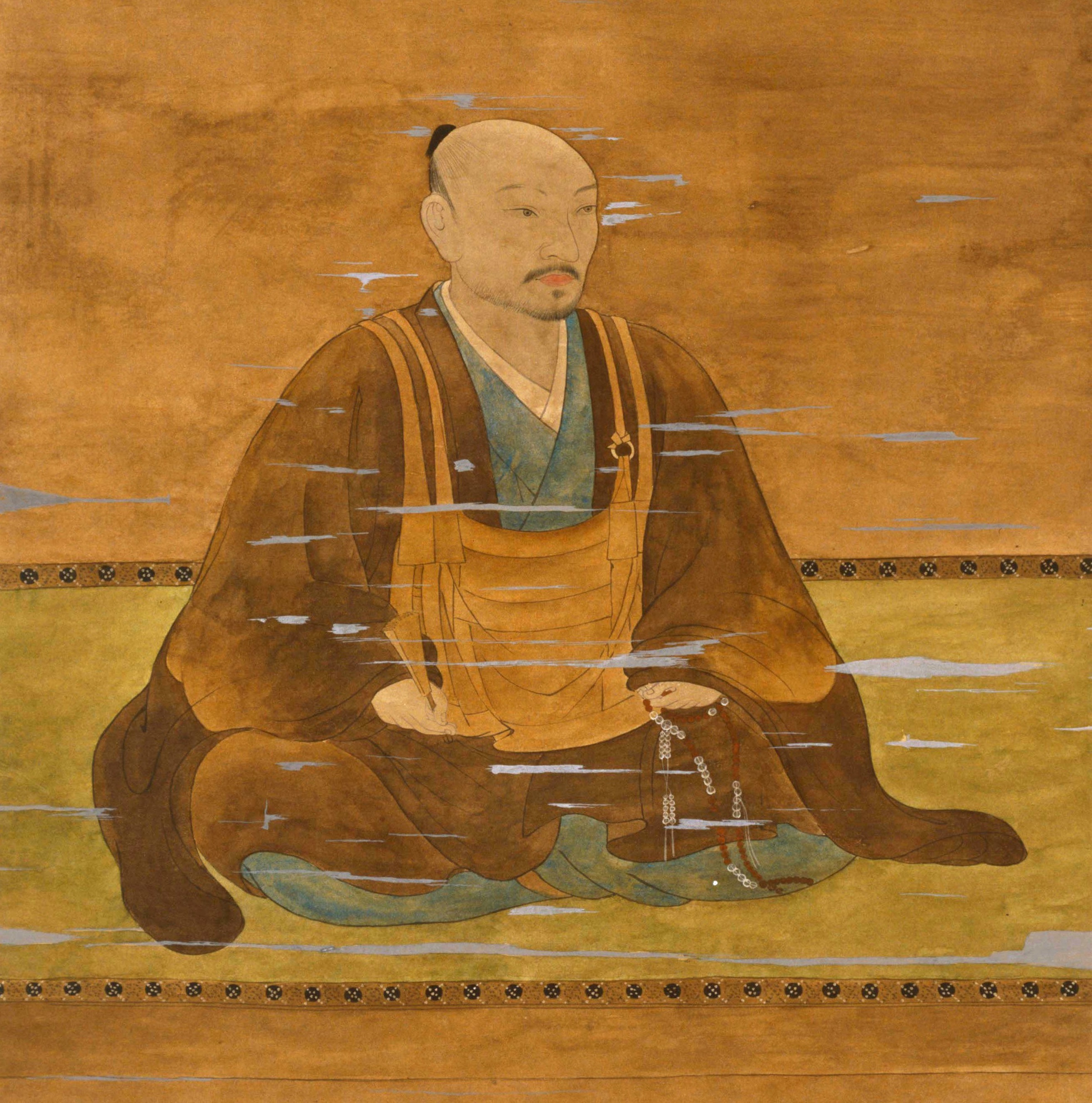
- Born: 1428
- Died: 1481 (aged 52–53)
- Burial place: Eirin-zuka, Ichijōdani Asakura Family Historic Ruins, Fukui, Fukui, Japan
- Occupations: Head of the Asakura clan, shugo-daimyō of Echizen Province

Asakura Toshikage (朝倉敏景, 1428 – 1481) was a Japanese military commander during the Muromachi period. He headed the Asakura clan, and was the shugo-daimyō (feudal military lord) of Echizen Province. He is best known for writing the Asakura Toshikage ju-shichi-ka-jo, the Asakura family code. During the Ōnin War (1467–1477), he initially allied with the western army, and then fought for the eastern army from 1471 until the war's end.

== Life ==
Toshikage was born in 1428.

In the 1460s, a struggle for control of Echizen Province started between two deputy-governor houses, the Asakura and the Kai. The Ōnin War started in 1468, which the Asakura were driven into by their Echizen conflict. During the war, Toshikage was allied with the western army, but in February 1471, he switched allegiance to the eastern army, becoming a subordinate of Shiba Yoshitoshi. Yoshitoshi was a contender for the head of the Shiba house, which was a suzerain of the Asakura family, and in exchange for Toshikage's support, Yoshitoshi gave him the title of the shugo-daimyo of Echizen, a title which the Shiba clan had held. Control over the province was contested, but Toshikage controlled a "lion's share" of the province by May. Toshikage is best known for the Asakura Toshikage ju-shichi-ka-jo, his 17-article Asakura family code.

He completed his conquest of Echizen on 6 August 1472, after defeating the Kai on the battlefield. The Kai and their allies left Echizen for Kaga Province. The Kai allied with Togashi Kochiyo, a faction leader who supported the western army, and was currently fighting for control of Kaga against his older brother in the Togashi family, Masachika, who supported the eastern army. In July 1473, the Kai and Kochiyo's Togashi faction drove Masachika out of Kaga, and Masachika in turn fled to Toshikage. A few days later, the Kai went to invade Echizen, and engaged Toshikage's army at Hosorogi-go on 8 August, which was on the boundary of the two provinces. Hosorogi-go was near Yoshizaki, where a Hongan-ji community was located. The Kai won, killing 70 of Toshikage's men and wounding 800, and then retreated back into Kaga. Three weeks later, on 1 October, the Kai returned to the area, and burned territory close to Yoshizaki.

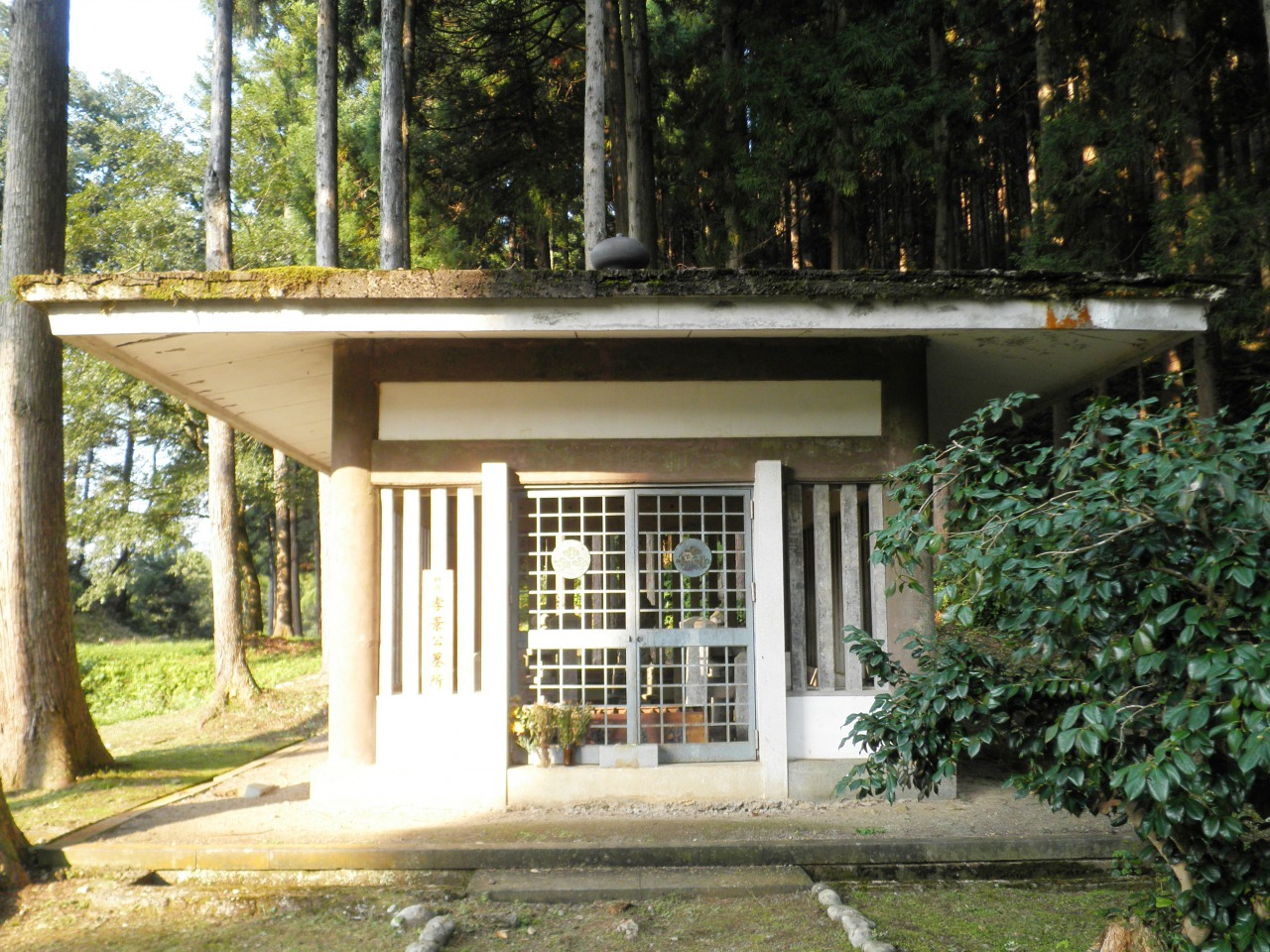
Eirin-zuka, Toshikage's grave

Masachika spent a year in Echizen, recruiting for a campaign back into Kaga. During the year, he returned to Yoshizaki and recruited Hongan-ji adherents to join his army. He eventually returned to the area, and received Hongan-ji recruits from both provinces. Meanwhile, Toshikage's army was "harassed" by the Kai's border skirmishes. The skirmishes failed, and after a fifth failure, in May 1474, a representative for the Kai went to Kyoto to consult with their allies. After they returned, the dominant warlord of Mino Province, southeast of Echizen, decided the fighting had gone on too long, and ordered Toshikage and the Kai to accept a truce. This made Kochiyo lose allies, and Masachika went to regain Kaga on 26 July. He would successfully invade it over the next few months. In 1475, Toshikage and the Shiba won a battle against the Kai. The Ōnin War ended in 1477.

Masachika's authority fragmented in the late 1470s and early 1480s. The Kai renewed their war with Yoshikage, still in Echizen, in 1479. The Kai made "little headway" for several years, and Toshikage died in 1481.

== Works cited ==
- Tsang, Carol Richmond (2007). War and Faith: Ikkō Ikki in Late Muromachi Japan, Harvard University Asia Center. ISBN 978-1-68417-457-7
- Wm. Theodore De Bary (2008). Sources of East Asian Tradition: Volume 1, Columbia University Press. ISBN 978-0-23114-305-9.
