= Norihide =

- Gender: Male

Origin
- Origin: Japanese
- Meaning: Different meanings depending on the kanji used

Norihide (written: 則秀, 憲秀, or 規秀) is a masculine Japanese given name. Notable people with the name include:

- Norihide Abe (阿部 規秀; 1887–1939), Imperial Japanese Army officer
- Tokuyama Norihide (徳山 則秀; 1544–1607), Japanese samurai
- Matsuda Norihide (松田 憲秀; ? – 1590), Japanese samurai
