= Asakura Norikage =

- 朝倉教景
- Born: 1477
- Died: September 23, 1555 (aged 77–78)
- Other names: Asakura Sōteki (朝倉宗滴)
- Occupation: samurai warrior
- Known for: Leading the Asakura against the Ikkō-ikki in the Battle of Kuzuryugawa at the Kuzuryū River in 1506

Asakura Norikage (朝倉 教景; 1477 – September 23, 1555), also known as Asakura Sōteki (朝倉 宗滴), was a Japanese samurai warrior of the latter Sengoku Period. from Asakura clan.

Norikage was the eighth son of Asakura Toshikage.

In 1506, he led the Asakura against the Ikkō-ikki in the Battle of Kuzuryugawa at the Kuzuryū River. In 1555, another engagement occurred in the Battle of Daishoji-omote.

In 1548, he became a priest and changed his name to Soteki; however, this did not keep him from engaging in war. He engaged in his last campaign at the age of 79 against Ikkō adherents (He captured Daishōji castle in 1555.). He died at the age of 82 in 1555. He participated in twelve battles in his life.
