= Tokuyama =

Tokuyama (written: 徳山, literally "mountain of virtue") may refer to:

== Locations ==
- Tokuyama Dam, a dam in Gifu Prefecture, Japan
- Tokuyama Domain, a Japanese domain of the Edo period
- Tokuyama Station, a train station in Yamaguchi Prefecture, Japan
- Tokuyama, Yamaguchi, a former city of Yamaguchi Prefecture, Japan
- Suruga-Tokuyama Station, a train station Shizuoka Prefecture, Japan

== Entities ==
- Tokuyama Corporation, a Japanese chemical company
- Tokuyama University, a university in Yamaguchi, Japan
- Tokuyama Women's College, a junior college in Yamaguchi, Japan

== Other uses ==
- Tokuyama (surname), a Japanese surname
