= Ikkō-shū =

Obscure sect of Japanese Buddhism

Ikkō-shū (一向宗), "single-minded school," was a sect of Japanese Pure Land Buddhists whose history remains obscure.

== Overview ==
Ikkō-shū was a sect founded by Ikkō Shunjō (1239–87) in the fifteenth century. He was a disciple of Ryōchū of the Chinzei branch of Jōdo-shū. However, his methods were similar to Ippen's and relied on itinerant wandering and the dancing nembutsu. As such, his sect was often associated with Ippen's Ji-shū. However there were also clear differences between the Ikkō-shū and the Ji-shū, such as the fact that the Ikkō-shū did not venerate kami and often disdained Shinto shrines.

Their behavior was also apparently too unconventional for religious and secular authorities. Ikkō's successor, Raichia (1252-1325), attempted to establish rules of conduct for the sect, but the reputation of the sect remained low in the eyes of the elites and they continued to suffer persecutions from the religious and political establishment.

From their inception, the Ikkō-shū was often confused with Jōdo Shinshū, and the name Ikkō-shū was often used synonymous with it.Shinshū leaders like Kakunyo and Yuizen had to appeal to the authorities to protect their members and prevent confusion with the Ikkō-shū.

Rennyo, the charismatic leader of the Hongan-ji branch of Jōdo Shinshū, responded to this situation by clarifying the positive religious meaning of Ikkō (single-minded), whilst simultaneously distancing his Shin school from the antinomian behaviour of the Ikkō sect, arguing they derived from Ippen's sect, not Shinran's. In his pastoral letters, known as Ofumi or Gobunsho, he therefore wrote:

It has been established with certainty that our Founder did not particularly name our school the "Ikkō-shū". On the whole, the reason the people call us this is that we place our complete reliance, exclusively, on Amida Buddha ... However, the Founder has specifically named this sect "Jōdo Shinshū". Therefore, you must understand that we of our sect did not originate in any manner or form the name of "One-Mind Sect.

However, according to Dobbins, Rennyo failed to fully dissociate Jōdo Shinshū from the Ikkō-shū label. Part of this was because many new converts to Shinshū came from Ikkō-shū and used continued to use the label for themselves. As such, the term Ikkō-shū was one of the most common names used for the Jōdo Shinshū school well into the 19th century.

Rennyo may have also borrowed some ideas and phrases used in Ikkō-shū literature, such as his use of the phrase "Buddha, please save me" (Butsu tasuke tamae), which is prevalent in Raichia's letters.

== Ikkō-ikki revolts ==
The Amida pietist movement, and in particular the Jōdo Shinshū, also provided a liberation theology (or ideology) for a wave of uprisings against the feudal system in late-fifteenth and sixteenth century Japan which are known as the Ikkō-ikki revolts. The causes of this phenomenon are disputed, but may have had both religious and sociopolitical causes.

As a consequence of the Ikkō-ikki revolts and the growing power of the Jōdo Shinshū, the sect's fortress-temples Ishiyama Hongan-ji and Nagashima (built at the end of the 15th century) were eventually destroyed by Oda Nobunaga's armies. The fortress at Nagashima was razed to the ground in 1574, taking about 20,000 people with it. The Ishiyama Hongan-ji withstood the longest siege in Japanese history before surrendering in 1580. Upon its ruins, Toyotomi Hideyoshi built Osaka Castle, a replica of which stands on the site today. Following the destruction of Nagashima, Nobunaga ordered his men to search all of Echizen Province and kill every last man and woman of the so-called Ikkō sect. Other Ikkō-shū Buddhists went underground, forming the kakure nenbutsu.
