= Yoshizaki-gobō =

Buddhist temple in Fukui Prefecture, Japan

Coordinates: 36°17′14″N 136°15′03″E

Yoshizaki-gobō 吉崎御坊
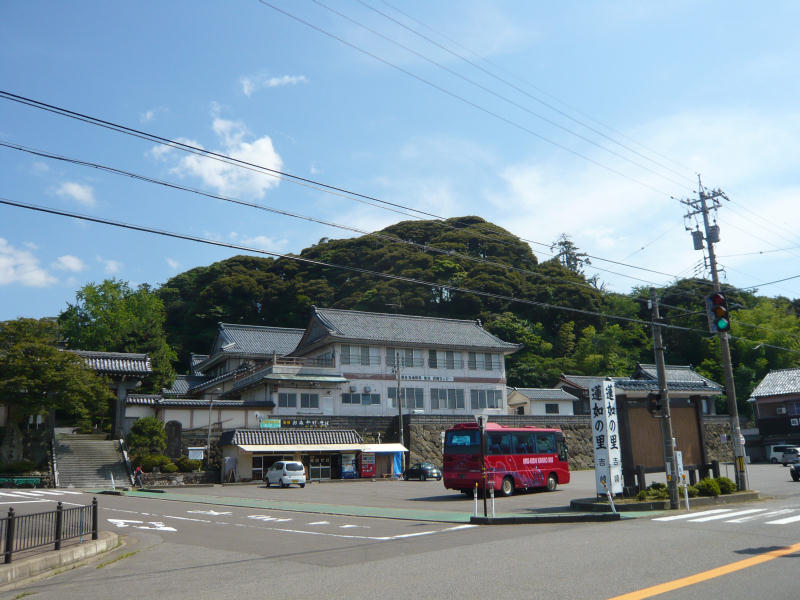
- Site of the Yoshizaki-gobō

- Yoshizaki-gobō Yoshizaki-gobō (Japan)

Religion
- Affiliation: Buddhism
- Sect: Jōdo Shinshū
- Status: Betsu-in

Location
- Location: Awara, Fukui
- Country: Japan
- Interactive map of Yoshizaki-gobō 吉崎御坊

Architecture
- Founder: Rennyo
- Completed: 1471

Website
- Official website(in Japanese)

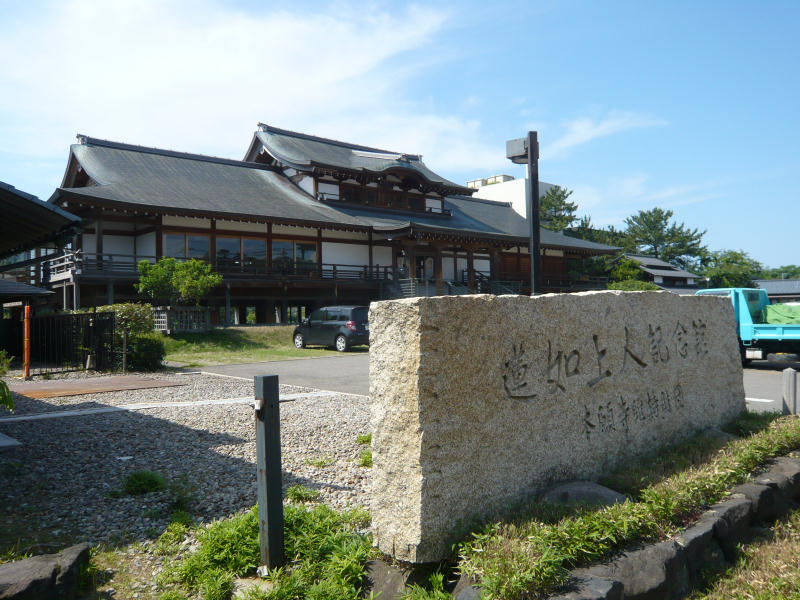
Monument to Rennyo

The Yoshizaki-gobō (吉崎御坊) was a Buddhist temple located in what is the Yoshizaki neighbourhood of the city of Awara, Fukui, Japan. It is known for its connection to Rennyo, the founder of the Ikkō sect of Japanese Buddhism. The ruins of the temple were designated a National Historic Site in 2012.

== Overview ==
In 1457, Rennyo was appointed as the eighth chief abbot of Hongan-ji, on the outskirts of Kyoto. Under Rennyo's leadership, Hongan-ji began to expand the teachings of Shinran's Pure Land Buddhism to areas beyond the capital. However, the rapid growth of Hongan-ji was met with hostility by the orthodox Tendai sect based at Enryaku-ji on Mount Hiei, and in 1465, Hongan-ji was destroyed by militant monks from Enryaku-ji and Rennyo was forced to flee Kyoto. In 1471, he re-established Hongaki-ji at the small village of Yoshizaki on the border of Echizen Province with Kaga Province. This rectory, known as the "Yoshizaki-gobō" was the location from which he sent out many epistles explaining the teachings of his version of the Pure Land faith, known as the Ikkō-shū, in colloquial Japanese, and was the location at which he reformed the ritual practices of the sect. It was also from this location that he implemented his vision of reforming society by creating a semi-theocratic republic, in which the traditional feudal landlords would be replaced by communal landholding by lay followers of the sect led by the priesthood, thus laying the foundations for the Ikkō-ikki movement. The town of Yoshizaki had residences for both priests and lay followers and provided lodgings and other services, and rapidly attracted large numbers of pilgrims mainly from the northern provinces as far away as Dewa and Ōshū. However, Rennyo's success at Yoshizaki drew hostility from the traditional political authorities. The Yoshizaki-gobō burned down in 1474 and again in 1475. After this, Rennyo left Yoshizaki and returned to Kyoto.

The Yoshizaki Hongan-ji continued to be used by his followers and the Kaga ikki movement until it was destroyed by the forces of the Asakura clan in 1506.

A new temple was built on the site in 1747, belonging to the Ōtani-branch of the Jōdo Shinshū movement.

== Gallery ==
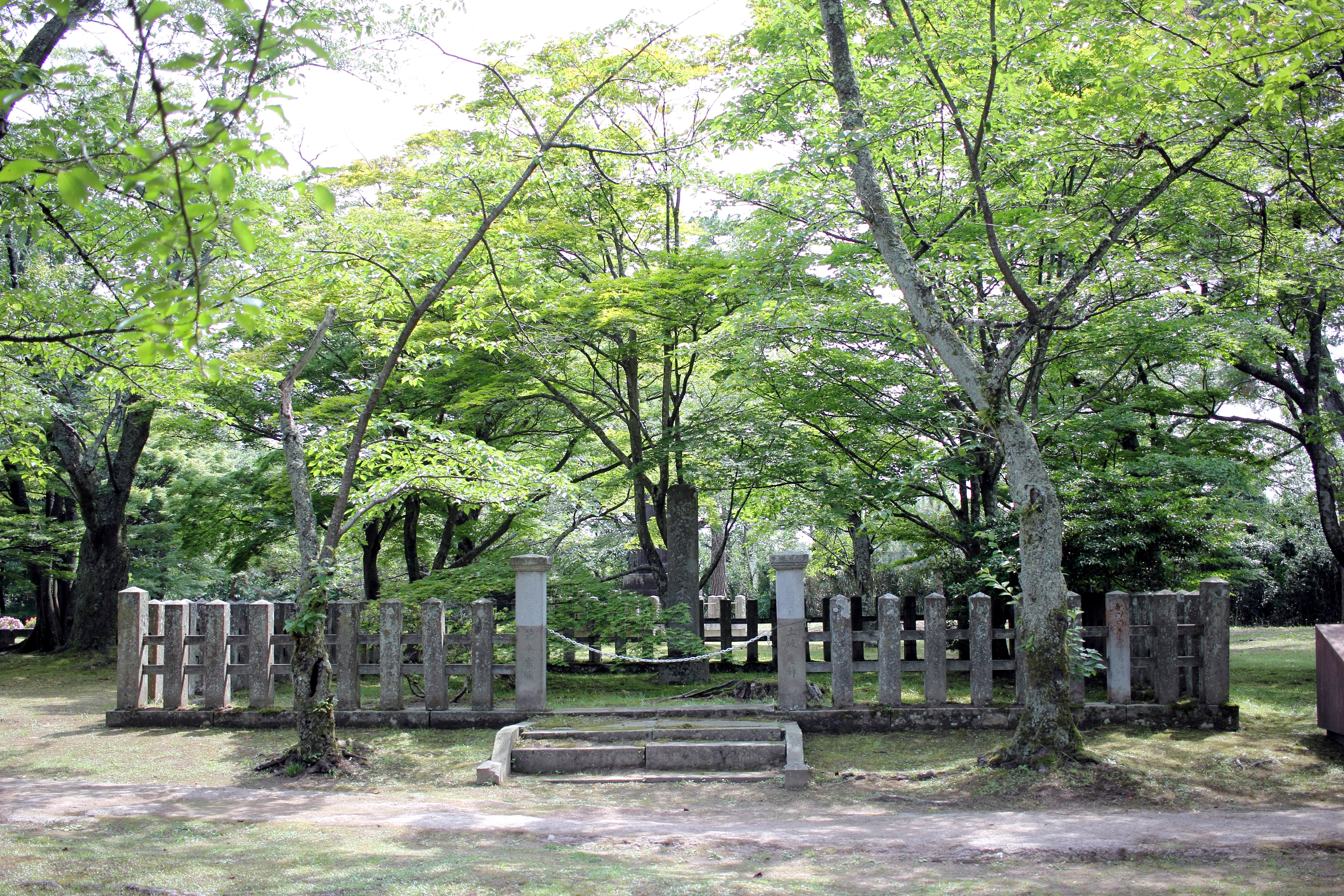
Monument on the site of the Yoshizaki-gobō

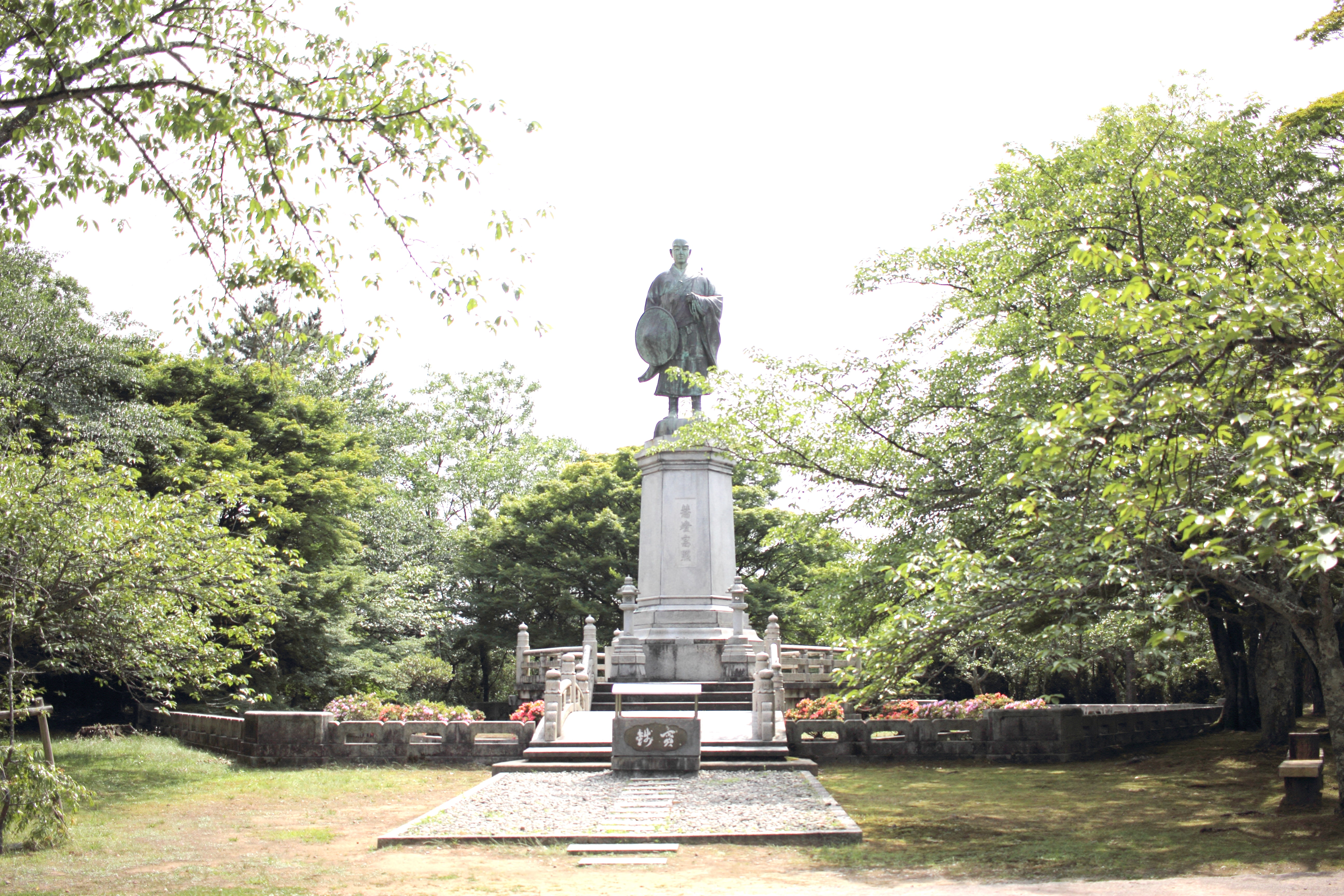
Bronze statue of Rennyo on the site of the Yoshizaki-gobō

== See also ==
- List of Historic Sites of Japan (Fukui)
