= Tokuyama (surname) =

Tokuyama (written: 徳山, lit. "mountain of virtue") is a Japanese surname. Notable people with the surname include:

- Hidenori Tokuyama (徳山 秀典, born 1982), Japanese actor and singer
- Masamori Tokuyama (徳山 昌守, born 1974), born Chang-Soo Hong, South Korean boxer
- Tokuyama Norihide (徳山 則秀, 1544–1607), Japanese samurai
- Tamaki Tokuyama (徳山 璉, 1903–1942), Japanese singer
