= Kakure nenbutsu =

Historically secretly practiced form of Buddhism in Japan

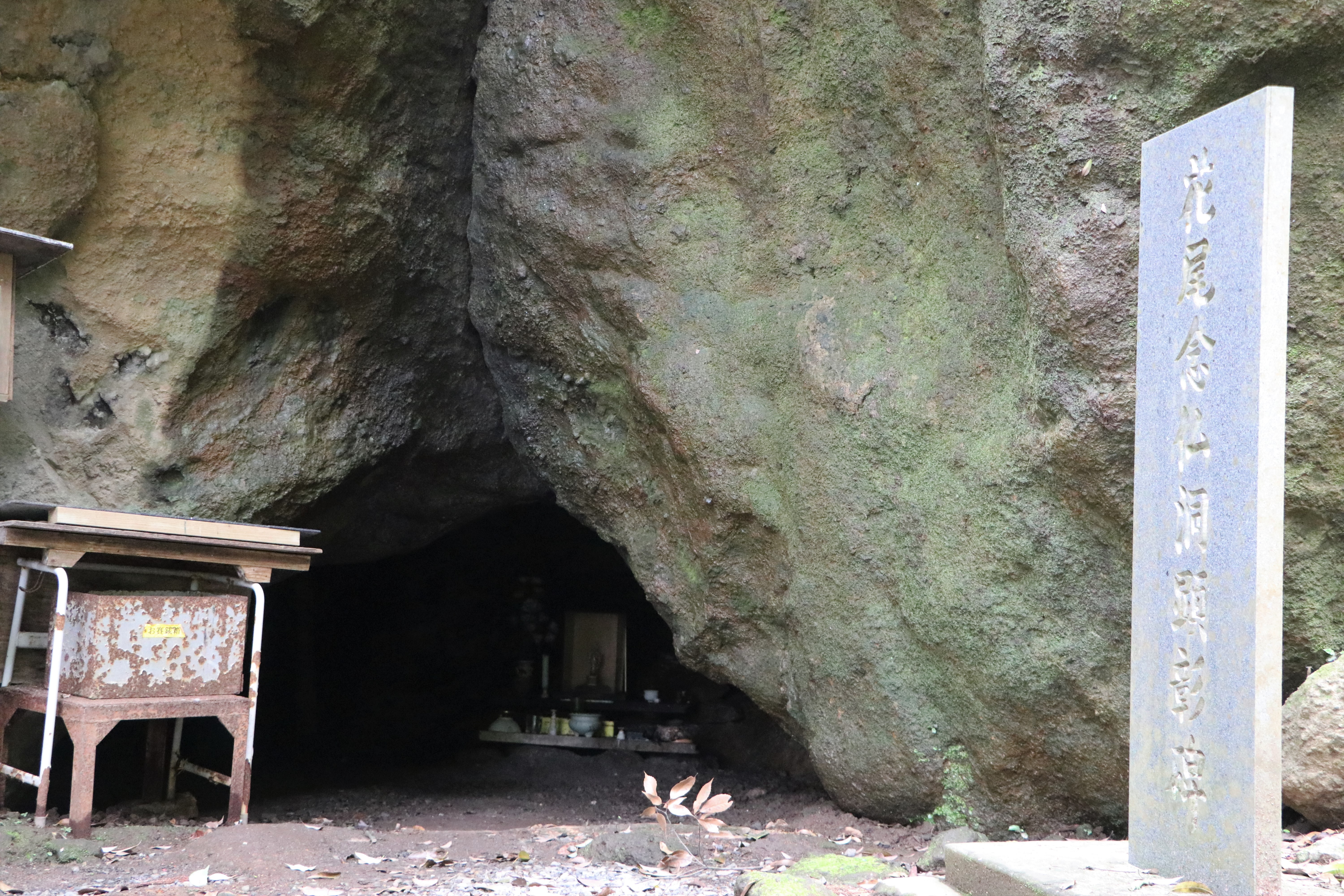
A cave in Hanao-cho, Kagoshima which was used by a hidden nembutsu sect

Kakure nenbutsu (隠れ念仏, "concealed nenbutsu"), kakushi nenbutsu (“hidden nenbutsu”) or Secret Shin, refers to forms of Jōdo Shinshū Buddhism practiced by secret lay groups of Japanese Buddhists. These groups developed distinctive ritual practices, initiation procedures, and doctrines that set them apart from temple-centered, institutional Shin Buddhism. Although historically viewed as heterodox by the major Shin denominations, these movements preserved a persistent lineage of small, insular communities based on ritual secrecy, and restricted transmission by esoteric teachers. Scholarly documentation is scarce; only a handful of modern ethnographies describe their contemporary activities, with Urahōmon being the best-attested surviving example.

== History ==
The kakure nenbutsu era began with the ikkō-ikki, violent uprisings of peasants encouraged and organized by the leadership of Jōdo Shinshū splinter group Ikkō-shū. The ikkō-ikki were part of a period of political instability in Japan and the threat they posed to samurai leadership was very real. In response to the uprisings, in Kyushu all forms of Shinshū were banned.

Historically, it was practiced most extensively in the Japanese island of Kyushu, in the Hitoyoshi Domain and Satsuma Domain, during a period of religious persecution from 1555 to the declaration of freedom of religion during the Meiji Restoration. Some Secret Shin lineages continue to exist in Japan to this day.

Kakure nenbutsu continued into the Edo period and were persecuted as secret organizations. In one instance, 1,700 believers were arrested. However, believers remained quite faithful and would send donations in secret to the Hongan-ji temples in Kyoto. Some members would appeal to Hongan-ji to help them with preserving orthodoxy.

Some kakure nenbutsu lineages departed from orthodox Shinshū and merged with yamabushi and other secret, esoteric practices. These groups, called kayakabe, continued to survive as of 1999, although there were virtually no young members among them.

The term kakushi nenbutsu (隠し念仏) refers to a different type of "hidden Amida Buddhism" practiced in the Tohoku region. Unlike kakure nenbutsu, kakushi nenbutsu still exist today as unregistered religious groups.

== Belief and practice ==
Secretive Shin lineages share the core doctrinal framework of Jōdo Shinshū such as faith in Amida Buddha, shinjin, and the significance of the nenbutsu. However, these elements are embedded within closed ritual cultures that have unique practices and doctrinal teachings. In some lineages, initiates undergo a rite through which shinjin is believed to be received “in an instant,” and this moment is treated as both a transformative event and a criterion distinguishing insiders from outsiders. Participation in sermons, rituals, or doctrinal instruction is restricted to those who have undergone this initiation, and buildings used for gatherings are commonly accessible only by invitation. Such boundaries function not only to regulate membership but also to sacralize the setting, marking it as separate from the public sphere and reinforcing its internal hierarchy.

Contemporary observations of the Secret Shin sect called Urahōmon illustrate how some of these communities function. Sermons are delivered as formalized performances combining liturgical framing actions, vernacular exposition, and the reading of authoritative passages attributed to Shinran. The service typically begins and ends with bell-ringing and communal recitation of the nenbutsu, actions that demarcate the event as a bounded ritual unit. Images of Amida and Shinran, together with the preacher’s distinctive vestments, evokes clerical legitimacy even in the absence of formal ordination. The sermon itself commonly centers on close analysis of Shinran teaching and interprets key concepts through analogies anchored in everyday experience, with special emphasis on gratitude and the reception of shinjin.

Within these secret movements, preaching functions simultaneously as doctrinal instruction and as a tacit mechanism of identity formation. The preacher’s exposition may imitate Shinran’s writing style, positioning him as a conduit of the founder’s authority.

The closed character of secretive Shin groups has contributed to their marginal position within mainstream Jōdo Shinshū. From the early modern period onward, official Shin institutions generally classified such lineages as deviant or heretical, and scholarly attention in Japanese and Western languages has been limited. Nevertheless, ethnographic accounts indicate that these communities maintain coherent internal structures, consistent ritual routines, and a strong sense of communal distinctiveness.

== See also ==
- Banishment of Buddhist monks from Nepal
- Bodh Gaya bombings, in India
- Buddhist crisis, in Vietnam
- Decline of Buddhism in the Indian subcontinent
- Four Buddhist Persecutions in China
- Haibutsu kishaku
- Persecution of Buddhists
