= Tokuyama Norihide =

Japanese samurai

- 徳山 則秀
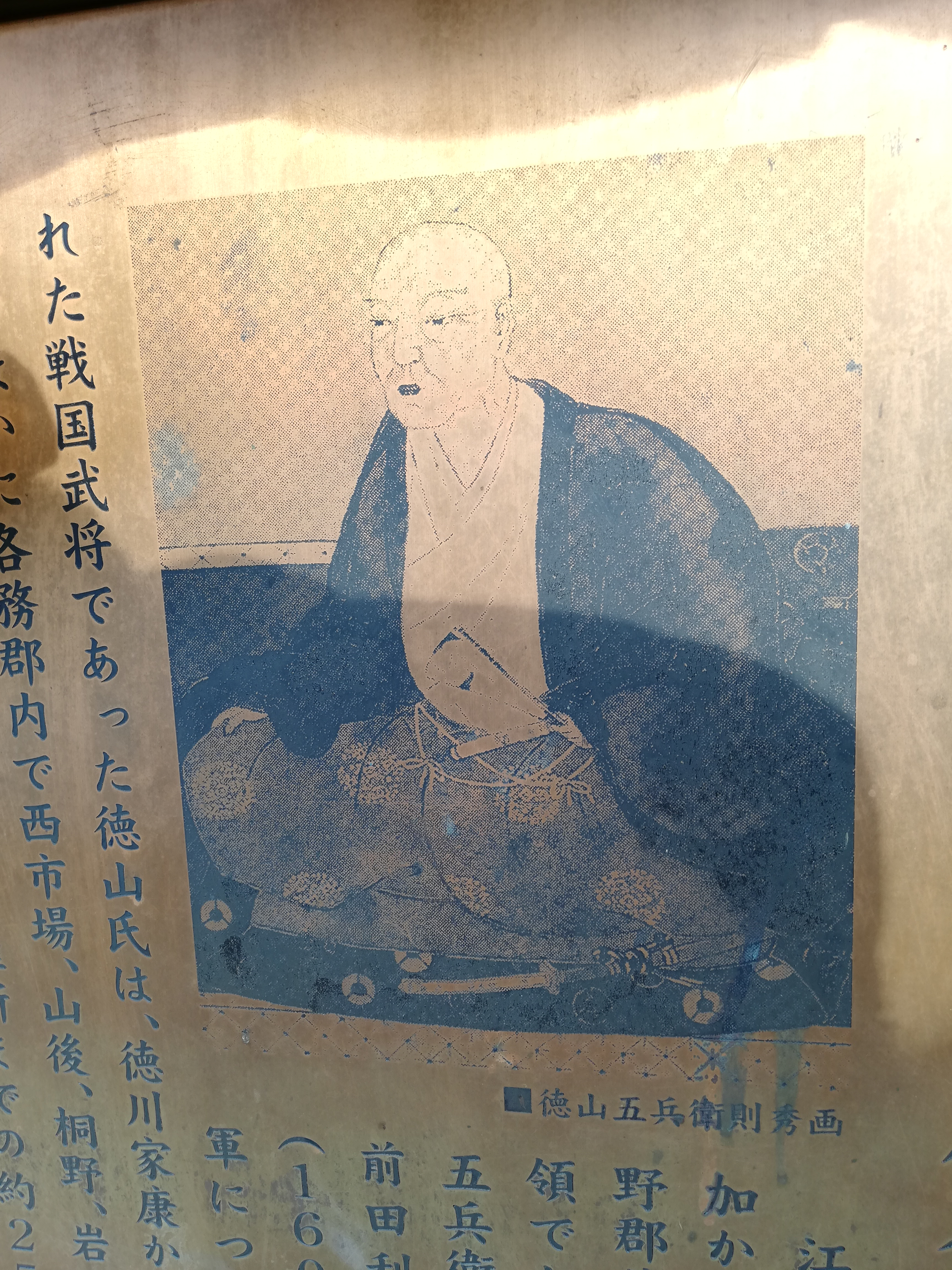
- Born: 1544; Mino Province
- Died: December 21, 1607 (aged 62–63)
- Occupation: Samurai

Tokuyama Norihide (徳山 則秀) (1544 – December 21, 1607) was a Japanese samurai of the Sengoku period through early Edo period.

== Personal life ==
Born in Mino Province, he first served the Saitō clan of Mino, before submitting to Oda Nobunaga, who assigned him as a yoriki to Shibata Katsuie.

== Career ==
After the Ikkō-ikki revolts in the Hokuriku region were subdued, Norihide was granted Matsutō Castle and a fief of 40,000 koku. Norihide sided with Shibata Katsuie in the Battle of Shizugatake (1583), and lost. He then submitted to Toyotomi Hideyoshi and was assigned to serve under Niwa Nagahide. After the death of Nagahide, Norihide was again reassigned, this time under Maeda Toshiie. Under Maeda command, Norihide again saw action, this time at the Siege of Suemori (1584), against the forces of Sassa Narimasa. Just before the Battle of Sekigahara (1600), Norihide left Maeda service and became a retainer of Tokugawa Ieyasu, who gave him a stipend of 5,000 koku. Norihide thus became the founder of a family of hatamoto who served the Tokugawa clan for the entirety of the Edo period.
