= Nagashima =

Nagashima 長島
- near Nagoya, Japan

Site information
- Type: Series of fortifications, incl. a fortified Buddhist monastery and pre-Azuchi-Momoyama period Japanese castle
- Controlled by: Ito Shigeharu (c. 1555), Ikkō-ikki (late 1550s – 1574)
- Condition: Ganshō-ji temple is rebuilt; remnants of fortifications are not extant and exact location is unknown

Location
- Coordinates: 35°5′34.5″N 136°41′52.1″E

Site history
- Built: 1550s–1560s
- Built by: Ito Shigeharu (castle), Ikkō-ikki (fortification network)
- In use: 1555–1574
- Materials: Wood, stone, earthworks
- Demolished: 1574 by Oda Nobunaga
- Battles/wars: Sieges of Nagashima (1571–1574)

Garrison information
- Garrison: 20,000 (incl. civilians)

Nagashima (長島) was a series of fortresses and fortifications controlled by the Ikkō-ikki, a sect of warrior monks in Japan's Sengoku period who opposed samurai rule. It was attacked and destroyed by Oda Nobunaga in the 1570s. This, combined with the surrender of the Ikki's other main fortress, Ishiyama Hongan-ji, several years later, ended the threat the Ikko-ikki posed to Nobunaga and other samurai conquerors.

The fortress was situated on a swampy delta, on the border of Owari and Ise Provinces, at the point where three rivers converge, to the southwest of the modern-day city of Nagoya. Nagashima was in fact a number of smaller fortifications surrounding two primary buildings and not a single fortress. Nagashima Castle was built in 1555 by Ito Shigeharu, and seized by the Ikkō-ikki shortly afterwards, in much the same way they had seized a number of other daimyōs' holdings. The Ganshō-ji fortified monastery formed the second center of Nagashima's defense.

At one time, the area may have been known as "Nanashima" or "seven islands". It is currently one island between the Kiso and Nagara Rivers, with Ise Bay at its southern tip.

The Oda clan, which controlled nearby lands, was wary of the Ikki's growing power, and engaged them at Ogie Castle in 1569. The Ikki were victorious, and Nobunaga's brother Nobuoki was killed. Nobunaga returned to lay siege to the Ikki's fortress three times, before finally subduing it in 1574 with the help of the Kumano Suigun (Navy) under the control of the Kuki family. He set the wooden structure ablaze, and none of the fortress cathedral's 20,000 inhabitants escaped.

According to the members of the Nagashima Historical Society, none of the main castle of Nagashima survived and its true location is unknown. What is believed to be the most probable location is now the site of a junior high school, which was identified in accordance to written descriptions of the area in the 16th century and what is believed to be an old moat. There is a map at the site, next to the school. The reconstructed castle gate was washed away during the Isewan Typhoon in 1959. Ganshōji was rebuilt some distance inland. A stone stupa was erected as a memorial to those killed in the burning of the fortress.

== See also ==
- Sieges of Nagashima
