= Ikkō-ikki =

Followers of Jōdo-Shinshū Buddhism who rebelled against their rulers in feudal Japan

Ikkō-ikki 一向一揆
- Mid-15th century – 1586
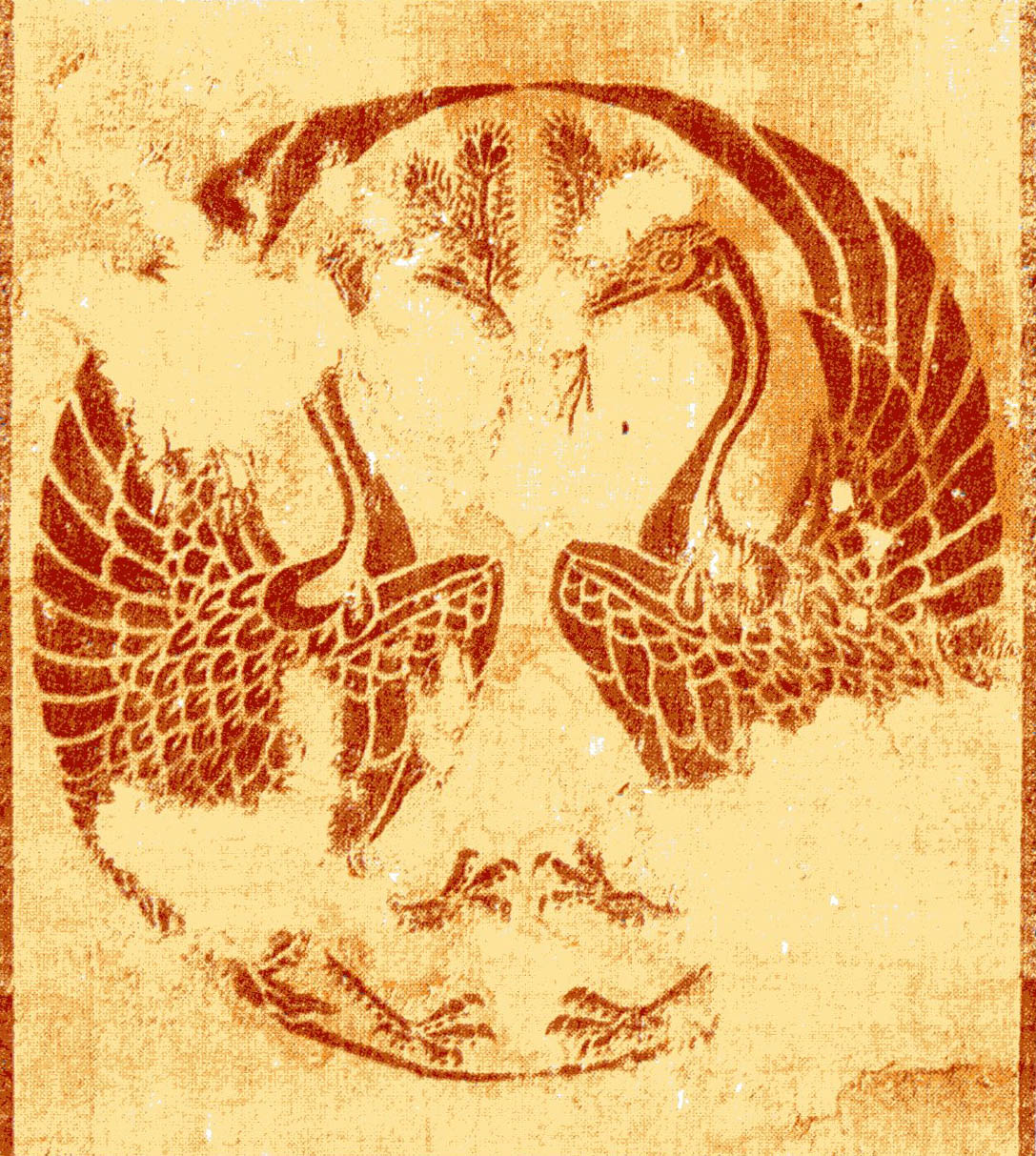
- The Tsurumaru ("Crane") flag, used by ikkō-ikki during the Ishiyama Hongan-ji War
- Status: Confederation
- Capital: Ishiyama Hongan-ji (de facto, 1496–1580); Other regional capitals
- Common languages: Late Middle Japanese
- Religion: Jōdo Shinshū Buddhism
- Monshu
  - 1457–1499: Rennyo
  - 1499–1525: Jitsunyo
  - 1525–1554: Shonyo
  - 1560–1592: Kōsa
- Historical era: Sengoku
  - Established: Mid-15th century
  - Disestablished: 1586

Ikkō-ikki (一向一揆; "single-minded leagues") were armed military leagues that formed in several regions of Japan in the 15th–16th centuries, composed entirely of members of the Jōdo Shinshū sect of Buddhism. In the early phases, these ikki leagues opposed the rule of local shugo (governors) or daimyō (lords), but over time as their power consolidated and grew, they courted alliances with powerful figures in the waning Ashikaga shogunate until they were crushed by Oda Nobunaga in the 1580s.

Ikkō-ikki mainly consisted of priests, peasants, merchants, and jizamurai (local military rulers) who followed the sect, but they sometimes associated with non-followers. The ikkō-ikki included organisations of sōhei "monk warriors", similar to the lay or semi-lay military orders of medieval Christianity. They were at first only slightly organized. However, during the reforms of the monshu Jitsunyo and, later, under his grandson Shōnyo, the temple network enabled more efficient and effective troop mobilization when needed. The relationship between Hongan-ji and its monshu was complicated: some monshu, such as Rennyo, condemned the violence, others, such as Shōnyo and Kennyo, channelled it to further political aims. With improvements in matchlocks firearms (teppo) at the time, called Tanegashima, ikkō-ikki could suddenly rise as a menacing force, posing a credible threat to the government. A peasant or merchant could transform himself into a capable mobile cannoneer in mere days.

== Terminology ==
An ikki (一揆, "Of one mind") in medieval Japan could be formed by any group that had a single goal in mind and vowed to stay together to achieve it. Carol Tsang lists two general categories of ikki:

1. Warrior-class leagues, which could be further subdivided into:
  - Ichizoku-ikki (一族一揆, "One family leagues") – Formed by extended samurai clans for mutual aid and defense. Members of such leagues were forbidden from attacking one another, and obligated to come to each other's aid.
  - Alternatively, Kokujin-ikki (国人一揆, "Governor leagues") – Formed by local provincial authorities (shugo) with other clans for mutual defense and administration.
2. Villager leagues, which could be further subdivided into:
  - Shō-ikki (荘一揆, "Estate league") – composed of members of the same shōen estate.
  - Tokusei-ikki (徳政一揆, "Virtuous governance leagues") – composed of villagers who demanded tax-relief from authorities
  - Do-ikki (土一揆, "Soil leagues") – composed primarily of villagers from the countryside. This term often overlapped with other ikki terms.

By contrast, ikkō-ikki defies easy categorization. The term Ikkō (一向, "Facing one direction") refers to the exclusive emphasis of the Jōdo Shinshū of striving for rebirth in the Pure Land of Amitabha. For this reason, Jōdo Shinshū was often pejoratively called the ikkō-shū or "'Facing one direction' sect". In any case, in contrast to other ikki, ikkō-ikki were defined not by political, familial, or economic association, but by a sense of community through their association with Jōdo Shinshū.

Adherents of Nichiren Buddhism formed hokke-ikki ("Lotus (Sutra) leagues") to oppose both Jōdo Shinshū, which they religiously opposed, and to fight ikkō-ikki, as well as for mutual aid and defence.

== History ==
=== Origins ===
The first recorded instances of an ikki date as far back as the 14th century in Bingo Province. However, with the waning years of the Muromachi period and the subsequent Sengoku period was characterized by weakening central power, and frequent conflicts between rival forces, the number of ikki proliferated. The first large-scale peasant uprising occurred in 1428 when a tokusei-ikki from Ōmi and Yamashiro provinces marched on Kyoto, the capital.

According to George Sansom,

The Ikko (Single-Minded) sect of Nenbutsu, or Buddha-calling ... is a branch of the worship of Amida developed from the teaching of Shinran into an aggressive doctrine of salvation by faith." In the 13th century, the jizamurai, a new class of small landowners, "formed leagues (ikki) for mutual defence [since they came from] good warrior families, long established in their own districts, and they were determined to protect their interests, both economic and social, against newcomers.

The Shirahata-ikki, "White Flag League", and Mikazuki-ikki, "Crescent League", are examples of the many ikki who rose against the Ashikaga shogunate. An uprising involving an entire province was called a kuni-ikki. Uprisings took place in 1351, 1353, 1369, 1377, 1384–1386, and 1366–1369.

The risings in the 15th century, tsuchi-ikki or do-ikki, were better organized, and the peasants appear to have played a more prominent part. At the conclusion of the Ōnin War, in 1477, "many of the members of the numerous ikki" occupied the monasteries and shrines, and "would ring the warning bells day and night, hoping to terrify the rich citizens", according to Sansom.

=== Early ikkō-ikki uprisings ===
Ikkō-ikki were initially disparate and disorganized followers of Rennyo's teachings. His missionary work and his appointment as abbot of Kyoto's Hongan-ji in 1457 enabled him to "express in words and deeds" his unorthodox views. The first instances of the Ikkō-ikki as a defensive league were formed in Ōmi Province to defend against the threats and violence from the Tendai-adherent sōhei armies of Enryaku-ji. The eighth monshu, Rennyo, proselytized in this area, and the growing influence threatened Enryaku-ji's interests there. Despite some efforts at a peaceful negotiation, including payments to cover any tax revenue shortfalls, the sōhei of Enryaku-ji attacked local communities at Katata in 1465. Jōdo Shinshū communities attempted to fortify their temples and villages, but failed to withstand the assaults by Enryaku-ji. The attacks resumed in 1468, resulting in the destruction of Hongan-ji, and by 1471 Rennyo and his family fled to the village of Yoshizaki in Echizen Province.

=== Yoshizaki and Kaga Province ===
A new temple community was established at Yoshizaki-gobō in 1471. It was here that Rennyo began to attract a significant following through extensive letter writing, clarifying orthodox Jōdo Shinshū doctrine, and refuting the teachings of rival subjects, in particular the Takada-shū. The village of Yoshizaki grew to a large, fortified community by 1473, and a network of temples across grew to accommodate increasing numbers of followers. Rennyo assigned family members to head new temples, or to manage existing temples, further strengthening the network. Disruptions by local Ikkō-ikki leagues forced Rennyo to draft a series of rules for proper conduct in 1475, which Jōdo Shinshū adherents were expected to follow, with limited effect.

An ongoing dispute between members local governorships forced the Hongan-ji sect to become involved in 1473 leading to a series of skirmishes and alliances in the 1470s and 1480s. By 1486, the conflict culminated in the Kaga Rebellion, which overthrew the governor of Kaga Province and established self-rule as the Kaga ikki; this represented the first time in Japanese history that a group of commoners ruled a province.

Rennyo, who was in a separate province at the time, was compelled by the authorities to admonish ikkō-ikki rebellions, to little effect, and stepped down as the Patriarch in 1489, before dying of illness in 1499. After stepping down, his second son, Jitsunyo, became the 9th monshu, and initially followed a conservative, cautious administration at first.

=== Dynastic entanglement and growing power ===
A complex dynastic dispute within the Ashikaga shogunate in 1493, with the forced deposition of Ashikaga Yoshitane by his former deputy shogun, Hosokawa Masamoto, led to a conflict between Yoshitane's faction led by the Hatakeyama clan and their opponents, the Hosokawa clan. Masamoto forcefully enlisted military aid from the 9th monshu, Jitsunyo, in particular to help with a stalled assault on Hatakeyama Yoshihide at Konda castle in late 1505. According to the account, Jitsunyo initially fled from Masamoto's approach, and retreated to Ōtsu, but Masamoto pursued him, reportedly cornering him until he relented. Jitsunyo had enjoyed the patronage of Masamoto, including protection from prosecution from the 1488 rebellions, but initially refused, citing his role as a priest and not a warrior. Eventually, Jitsunyo relented.

While most Hongan-ji temples heeded the call to arms, some factions in Settsu and Kawachi provinces supported Yoshitane's faction, and refused to fight under the Hongan-ji banner. Nonetheless, in 1506, ikkō-ikki armies helped defeat Konda castle, defeating Asakura Norikage in the Battle of Kuzuryūgawa of 1506, and triggering further uprisings in neighboring Etchū, Echizen, and Noto provinces, followed later by Mikawa Province. By 1507, Masamoto had been assassinated and fighting amongst Hosokawa successors led to a stalemate.

During this time, Jitsunyo reformed the hierarchy of the Hongan-ji and its network of temples into either ichimon (一門, "one clan") temples staffed by family members, or ikke-shū (一家衆, "one family group") temples with more autonomy, but subordinate to Hongan-ji. This increased centralization was intended to improve administration, but it also enabled ikkō-ikki forces to be more effectively mobilized. In addition to these reforms, the letters of Rennyo were collected and a subset were selected as a core party of Jōdo Shinshū doctrine, known as the ofumi (御文, "letters") or alternatively "The [collection of] letters" (ご文書; gobunsho) leading to increased uniformity.

=== Escalating military conflicts ===
Following Jitsunyo's death in 1525, Jōdo Shinshū temples in the provinces increasingly formed into jinaichō (寺内町, "temple towns"): fortified temple communities that did not permit military officials to enter, while also managing their own tax collection. Meanwhile, ikkō-ikki also established a fortress complex at Ishiyama Hongan-ji, just outside Osaka in 1496, and in Nagashima, on the borders of Owari and Ise Provinces and in a series of temples in Mikawa Province as well.

By the 1530s the Hongan-ji was directly involved in a series of conflicts, starting with the Daishō-ikki (大小戦争, "Big-Little [Temple] ikki") conflict in Kaga Province, pitting the 10th monshu, Shōnyo, against rebellious temples, followed soon after by military assistance to Hosokawa Harumoto in the Tenbun War (天文の乱, Tenbun no ran) of 1532–1536. The Ikko-ikki defeated Nagao Tamekage in the 1536 Battle of Sendanno. By July 17th of that year, local Ikko-ikki forces marched into Nara and sacked it, looting Kasuga Shrine. Unlike his predecessors Shōnyo did not hesitate to mobilize forces, or discipline temples that were non-compliant.

The Ikko-ikki also fought Asakura Norikage again in the 1555 Battle of Daishoji-omote.

=== Apex of power and downfall ===
Towards the end of the 16th century, their growing numbers and strength caught the attention and concern of the great samurai leaders of the time. Tokugawa Ieyasu worried that the ikkō-ikki of Mikawa Province would rise up and seize the province. In 1564, his forces, with the help of Jōdo-shū forces, defeated the Mikawa-ikki in the Battle of Azukizaka.

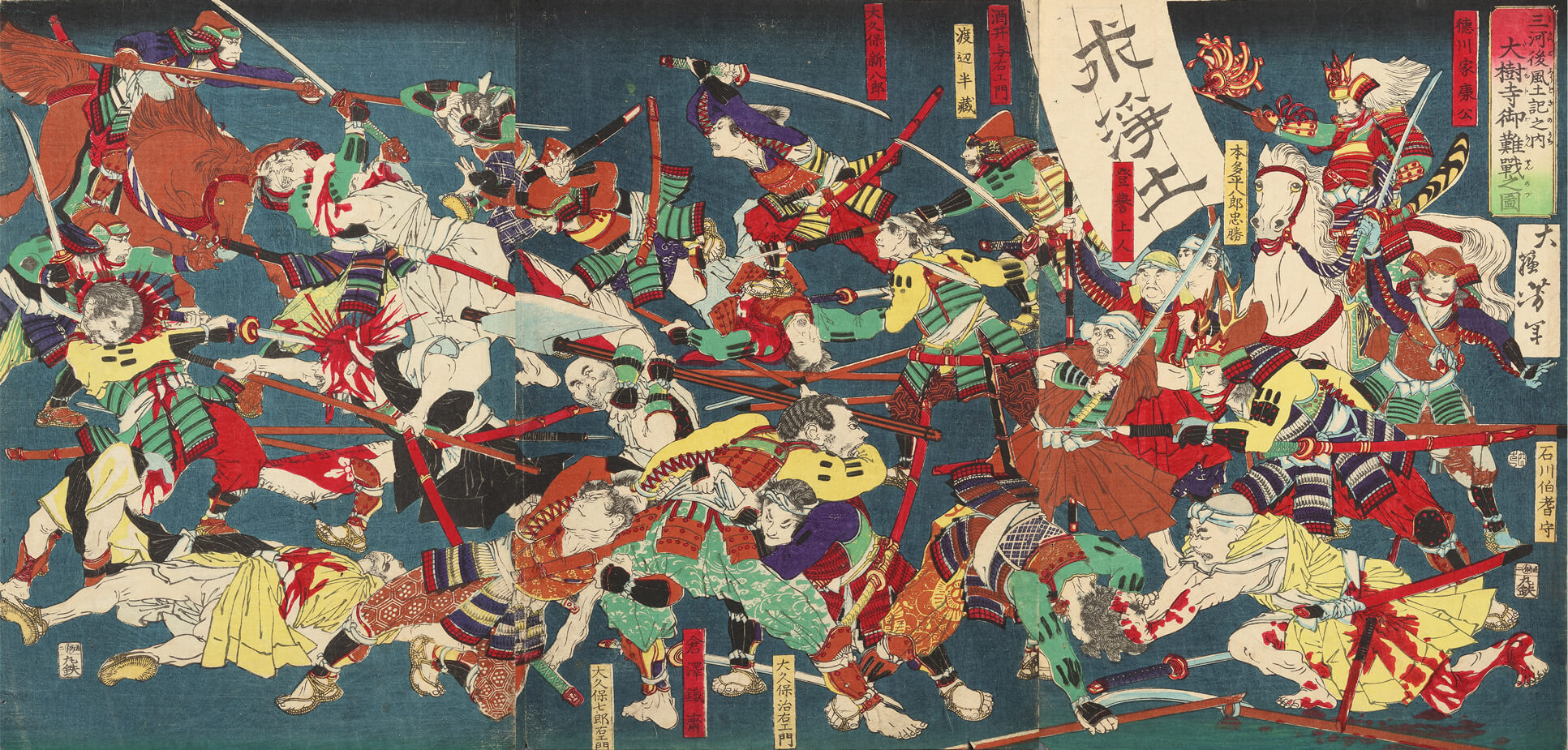
The Battle of Azukizaka in 1564 was the climactic clash between Tokugawa Ieyasu and the ikkō-ikki.

By this point, Ishiyama Hongan-ji and other strongholds of the ikkō-ikki lay across major trade routes and occupied the same areas that Nobunaga saw as his primary territorial objectives. Nearly every road to the capital from this western part of the country was controlled by ikkō-ikki or their allies, and their populist roots gave them significant economic power as well. Nobunaga in particular sought the destruction of the ikkō-ikki for these reasons, and because they allied themselves with nearly every one of his major enemies or rivals. Ashikaga Yoshiaki was once strongly supported in his claim to become Shōgun by Nobunaga, but turned to the ikkō-ikki when their relationship soured. The ikkō-ikki also had powerful allies in the Mōri, Azai, and Asakura clans. In the Asakura stronghold of Echizen Province (now Fukui prefecture, Nobunaga ordered his generals to kill the people in Ajimano (a village now part of Echizen, Fukui) in August 1575, as noted in The Chronicle of Lord Nobunaga. Ishiyama Hongan-ji was besieged several times by the forces of Oda Nobunaga in the Ishiyama Hongan-ji War, as was the Sieges of Nagashima. After several failed attempts at seizing each emplacement, Oda successfully defeated Nagashima by 1574 after a four-year siege, and Ishiyama Hongan-ji in 1580 after an 11-year siege.

The majority of the Hongan-ji forces, including the 11th monshu, Kōsa, Shōnyo's son, submitted to Nobunaga's authority, relinquishing much of their independence in the process, though a few holdouts resisted as late as 1585.

In the 1580s, the last of the ikkō-ikki courted Toyotomi Hideyoshi, and fought alongside his forces against warrior monks and priests of other sects.

== Weapons, training, and lifestyle ==
The Ikkō-ikki bands of the 16th century, owing largely to their origins as countryside mobs, employed a wide range of armour and armament. Many wore the more traditional priest robes, with varying degrees and types of armour. Some wore various types of helmets, while others opted for a peasant's straw hat and cloak. Naginata remained very common, along with a variety of swords and daggers, and a limited number of Tanegashima firearms. A very common item wielded by the Ikkō-ikki priest-warriors was a banner bearing a Buddhist slogan. Some of the more common slogans included the chant Namu Amida Butsu (南無阿弥陀仏) and "He who advances is sure of salvation, but he who retreats will go to hell".

Jōdo Shinshū was persecuted in response to the Ikkō-ikki, which caused the formation of kakure nenbutsu secret societies.
