= Rennyo =

8th Monshu (head priest) of the Hongan-ji Temple of Jōdo-Shinshū Buddhism (1415-99)

Rennyo (蓮如)
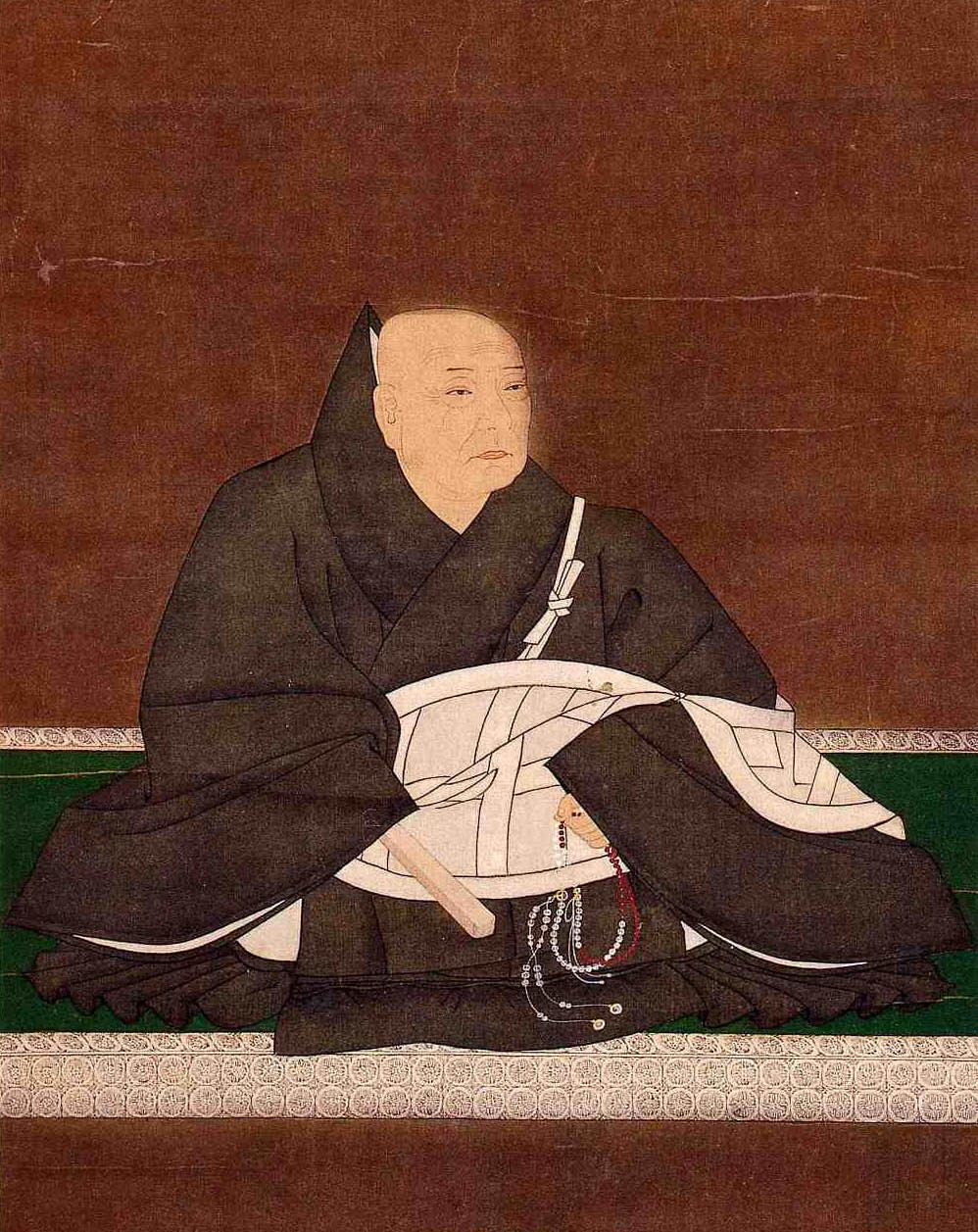
- Portrait of Rennyo, painted during the Muromachi Period
- Title: Restorer of Jodo Shinshu Buddhism, 8th monshu of the Honganji

Personal life
- Born: Hoteimaru (布袋丸); 1415 Kyoto, Japan
- Died: 1499 (aged 83–84) Osaka, Japan
- Other name: Kenju (兼寿)

Religious life
- Religion: Buddhism
- School: Jodo Shinshu Buddhism

Senior posting
- Predecessor: Zonnyō

Rennyo (蓮如, 1415–1499) was a descendant of Shinran and the 8th head priest of the Hongan-ji branch of Jōdo Shinshū, a major Japanese Buddhist tradition. He is known for his tireless preaching of the Shin teaching and is credited with transforming the Honganji into a major religious organization. According to Dobbins, during Rennyo's tenure, Hongan-ji temple "emerged as the premier institution of the school, and the Shinshū itself burgeoned into one of Japan's largest and most powerful schools of Buddhism." Shinshū Buddhists often refer to him as the restorer of the sect (Chūkō no sō (中興の祖) in Japanese). He was also known as Shinshō-in (信証院), and posthumously Etō Daishi (慧灯大師).

Rennyo led the Hongan-ji during the conflict ridden Sengoku era, working to grow and reform the tradition. He successfully navigated his temple's relationships with various groups, including the secular authorities, the warrior monks of Mt. Hiei, and the Ikkō-ikki rebellions. Rennyo's leadership and his promotion of Shinshū teachings led to a large influx of new members. His years as head priest also saw the reform of Hongan-ji liturgy and practices. Rennyo's ability to interpret Shin Buddhist teaching in a simple manner allowed him to spread the teachings widely among ordinary people. Rennyo's pastoral letters were the most articulate and popular explanations of Shin doctrine of his time, and they made Jōdo Shinshū one of the most widespread and enduring Buddhist teachings in medieval Japan. His teachings also defined the orthodox doctrine of the Honganji sect, which remained closely aligned with his doctrines until the modern era.

Today, Rennyo is venerated in the Hongan-ji sects as the "Second founder", alongside Shinran. His liturgical reforms and writings remain authoritative texts in Hongan-ji temples today.

== Biography ==
Rennyo lived in a time of war and social turmoil, marked by the trouble around the Ōnin War (1467—1477) and the Warring States era (Sengoku Jidai, 1467—1615), during which the capital of Kyoto was ravaged by war. Traditional authorities, secular and religious, declined during this time. Despite facing numerous trials and persecutions, Rennyo was able to survive and help Shin Buddhism thrive during this time.

=== Early life ===
Born as Hoteimaru (布袋丸), later Kenju (兼寿), Rennyo was the son of Zonnyō (存如, 1396–1457, who later became the 7th Monshu (門主; "Patriarch") of the Hongan-ji. Rennyo was born out of wedlock when his father was 18. His mother, a servant whose name is now unknown, was sent away when Rennyo was only six years old. Several times throughout his life he attempted to find her, with no result.

As the eldest son of Zonnyō, Rennyo gained experience as a priest, assisting his father in temple duties. He also frequently quarreled with his stepmother, Nyoen (d. 1460), and after Zonnyō's death (1457), she attempted to have her own son, Ogen (1433–1503), installed as the successor to the head of Hongan-ji. However, Rennyo's influential uncle, Nyojō (1402–1460), dismissed the idea and Rennyo ultimately succeeded as the 8th Monshu.

=== Early Ministry ===
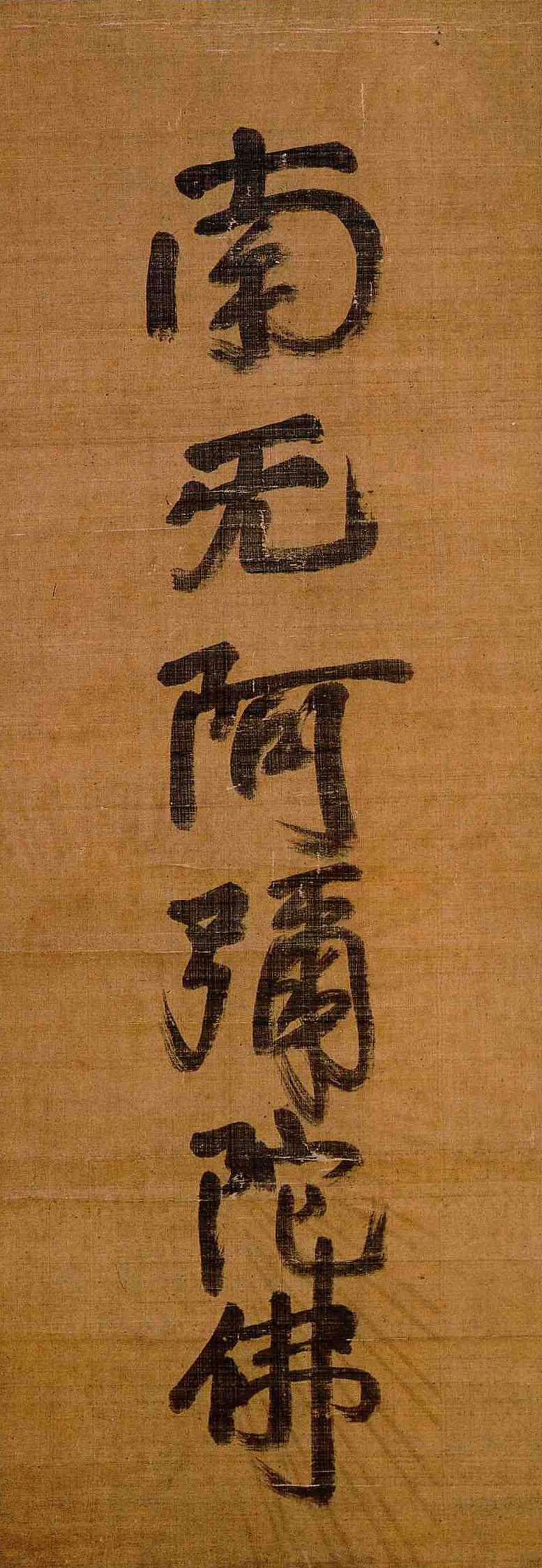
Rennyo distributed calligraphic nembutsu honzons such as this one to local congregations as part of his preaching activities.

Following his installation as 8th head priest at Hongan-ji in 1457, Rennyo focused his efforts in proselytizing in Ōmi Province, an area dominated by the Bukkō-ji and Kinshoku-ji branches of Shinshū. Due to timely support of the wealthy Katada congregation, Rennyo was able to expand the Honganji's presence in this province significantly. These congregations in Ōmi were frequently composed of artisan-class followers, who were able to provide crucial funds and protection.

During his early ministry, Rennyo would frequently distribute religious texts to congregations as well as inscriptions of the nenbutsu (recitation of Amitābha Buddha's name). These inscriptions frequently used the so-called "10-character nembutsu" or Jūjimyōgō (十字名号): Kimyō Jin Jippō Mugekō Nyorai ("I take refuge in the Tathāgata of Unobstructed Light Suffusing the Ten Directions"). He also wrote a commentary to Shinran's Shōshinge during this time and distributed to Shin congregations.

The monks of the Enryaku-ji (the head temple of the Tendai School located on Mt. Hiei), noticing Rennyo's successes in the provinces around Kyoto, became concerned about the growth of what they considered heresy. In 1465, Mt. Hiei sent a band of sōhei (warrior monks) to the Hongan-ji and destroyed most of the temple on charges of heresy. The actual motivation for these attacks was likely financial. Mt. Hiei had significant interests in Ōmi Province that included estates and businesses, and felt they needed to prevent Jōdo Shinshū's growth before they felt the economic effects. However, due to the wealth of the congregations Rennyo had converted in the area, enough money was raised to send an armed force of men from the Takada congregation, and the Mt. Hiei warriors were eventually bribed away. The contingency to this was that Hongan-ji must become a branch temple of the Mt. Hiei Tendai complex, and pay yearly dues. According to one account, Rennyo was able to flee at the last minute due to timely assistance from a cooper who saw the attackers coming, and led Rennyo out through the back with an image of Shinran.

The years immediately following the attack of 1465 forced Rennyo to live by traveling from place to place and living among various congregations. During this time Tendai warrior monks repeatedly attacked Shin Buddhists in Ōmi Province and Rennyo became very concerned about the future of the Shin tradition. Shortly after he settled among the Katada community, Mt. Hiei threatened to attack again and he fled again until he took refuge under Mii-dera, a powerful rival Tendai temple to Mt. Hiei. However, this protection was not enough, and Mt. Hiei attacked the Takada congregation, forcing Rennyo to move further. Due to the Ōnin War in Japan, the central government of shogunate was unable to restrain Mt. Hiei and its monastic army. In spite of these troubles, Rennyo continued to win allies and converts to Jōdo Shinshū in Ōmi as well as in other provinces like Mikawa, Settsu and Yoshino. He also visited Kantō in 1469 and won many followers, even though this area had traditionally dominated by the Senju-ji branch of Shinshū.

=== Rebuilding in Echizen ===
Stone signpost at Kinome Pass on the old Hokurikudō road, Fukui Prefecture, inscribed 「親鸞聖人ハ越後ノ国国府ヘ 蓮如上人ハ越前ノ国吉崎ヘ」 ("Saint Shinran to the provincial capital of Echigo; Saint Rennyo to Yoshizaki in Echizen"), marking the routes the two priests took over the pass

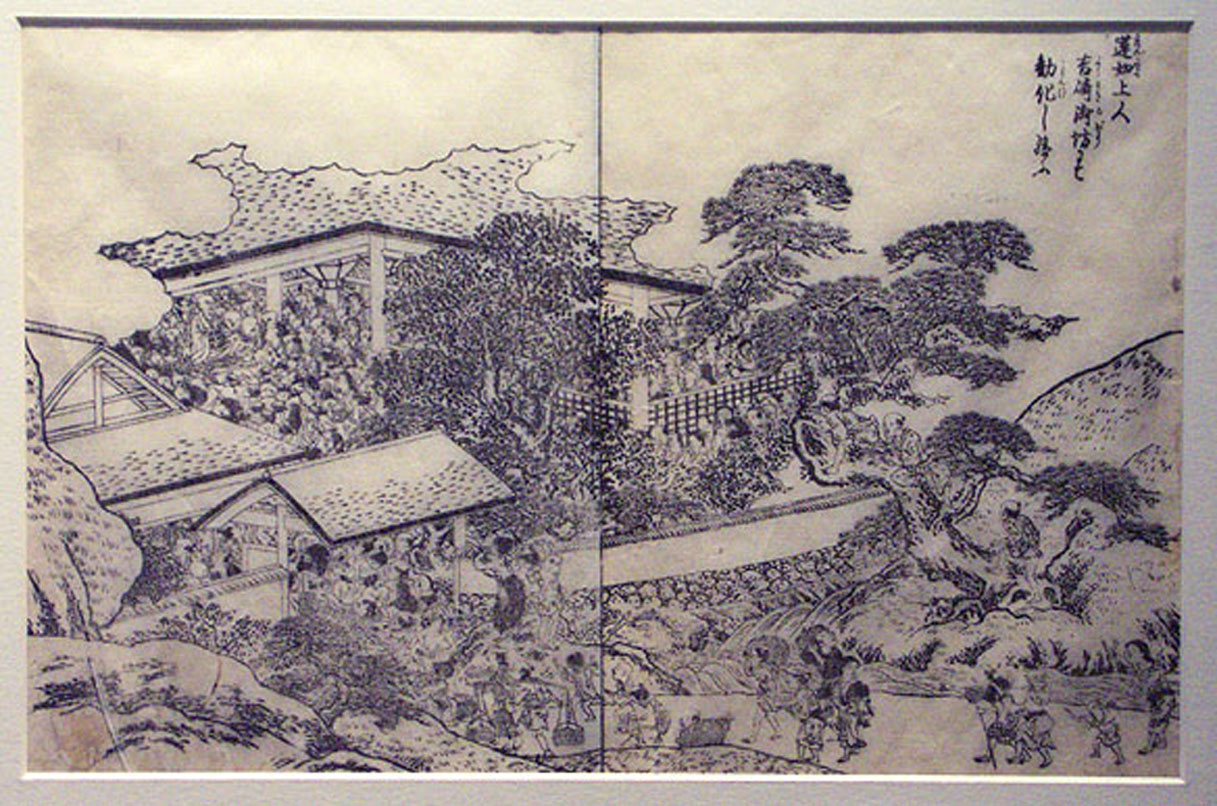
Priest Rennyo Preaching at Yoshizaki, 1803

Due to the constant threat of attack from Mt. Hiei, Rennyo did not feel he could rebuild Hongan-ji in the traditional Shin stronghold of Ōmi Province. As such, he took the biggest decision of his career in 1471 and established a new Hongan-ji center far away from the influence of Mt. Hiei in Echizen Province (present-day Fukui Prefecture), at a village called Yoshizaki (吉崎) on the Hokuriku seaboard.

This was a remote area conveniently located near a coastal route, with a number of Shinshū congregations from other sects already present. As pilgrims and Shin followers flocked to the new center, a new city sprang up around the new Hongan-ji temple. By 1473 the site had become a thriving religious center with Rennyo at its head. He became a popular teacher and speaker, drawing huge crowds.

Rennyo initially proselytized to the Hokuriku congregations through preaching tours, but after his reputation became well established he shifted toward pastoral letters (御文, ofumi), also called the gobunsho (御文書). These letters proved effective because they were written in clear, comprehensible Japanese, could be read before a congregation, and were effective in clarifying the meaning of Shinran's original teachings. These letters constitute the majority of his literary output. Later generations compiled the gobunsho letters and thus they have become part of Jodo Shinshu liturgy since. Another aspect of Rennyo's ministry was his humility and openness. He would visit congregations and sit with the lowborn rather than on raised platforms. He would also take care of their needs and drink sake with them, behaving like a normal person rather than an elite or a holy man. During this time, local congregations called kō formed the main grass-root basis of the Hongan-ji organization. These village congregations would meet once or twice a month for discussion and worship, usually at a local home. Their donations also supported the Hongan-ji organization. Once established, Yoshizaki, known today as Yoshizaki Gobō (吉崎御坊; "Yoshizaki Hermitage"), flourished and adherents from surrounding provinces came to hear Rennyo speak. The congregation became so big that along the way to the new Hongan-ji there were hundreds of lodges set up and run by Shinshū priests to lodge the travelers.

However, as Rennyo drew more followers, including lower-ranking samurai, he and his followers became embroiled in a power-struggle in Kaga Province between two brothers of the Togashi family. Kaga province Shin followers were now banding together to form the Ikkō-ikki movement, led by the idea that all believers were equal in the eyes of Amida Buddha. These ikki leagues eventually sided with Togashi Masachika in 1473, though they eventually turned on him by 1488. After this, Kaga province was governed by a coalition of Shin Buddhist groups for 93 years. Rennyo tried to keep a delicate balance by maintaining positive relationships with the ruling Ashikaga shogunate in Kyoto and exhorting followers to follow proper conduct in civil society. He never encouraged their military endeavors. At the same time, he ministered to the Kaga congregations and protected them from governmental wrath when they rebelled against the authorities, refusing to expel them from his organization despite official reprimands.

Rennyo was concerned with defending his tradition against accusations of heterodoxy or heresy. He was also very concerned with the wrong views and behaviors that had arisen among some Shinshū followers, seeking to improve their standing in the larger Buddhist community and to defend the orthodox views of Shinran against distortion. He also instituted okite (掟; "Rules governing the community") which were derived from previous rules used by Shin congregations in the past. This was the first time that an overall set of rules of conduct were promulgated throughout the school. The original 1473 list of rules were as follows:

1. Do not belittle the various gods (kami), Buddhas, or bodhisattvas.
2. Do not slander any of the other religious teachings or sects.
3. Do not criticize other sects on the basis of our sect's practices.
4. Even though there are no taboos taught in Buddhist law, strictly observe the taboos publicly and with other sects.
5. It is not right to praise the Buddhist law in ways not transmitted in our sect.
6. As nembutsu believers, obey the military governors and land stewards of the province and do not denigrate them.
7. It is not right for those who are ignorant to speak freely and admiringly of the teachings of our sect, relying on their own ideas, in front of members of other sects.
8. It is not right for those who are not yet settled in their faith to speak admiringly of the teachings of the faith, based on what they have heard.
9. Do not eat fish or birds at nembutsu meetings.
10. Since in sake, one loses the ability to think deeply and distinguish right from wrong, do not drink on days where there are nembutsu meetings.
11. Among nembutsu believers, all gambling must stop.

The main aim of these rules was restraining the unruly and socially problematic behaviors of Shin followers in the Hokuriku regions. Over time, they became an important organization tool for shaping Shin Buddhism into a socially acceptable organization. Rennyo also took a more conciliatory attitude towards the Shinto kami gods, which he presented as manifestations of the Buddha Amida (as per honji suijaku). Rennyo was so concerned with making Shin Buddhism socially acceptable that he even enjoined his followers to hide their faith when necessary and to obey all secular laws and authorities.

=== Return to Kyoto ===
In 1475 the political situation in Hokuriku had become too volatile, so in 1475, Rennyo returned to the Kyoto area, having by now developed a reputation as a respected religious leader. He returned with a massive following, and felt confident that the Mount Hiei monks no longer posed a credible threat to Jōdo Shinshū. On returning to Kyoto, he began constructed a new large Hongan-ji head temple (which was completed in 1483) in Yamashina ward, which was particularly impressive in the war torn landscape after the Ōnin War. He also continued to proselytize in provinces around Kyoto, often making use of extensive letter writing, as well as working tirelessly to stamp out wrong views and Shin heresies (such as "secret Shin teachings"). His continued preaching efforts brought many new converts to the Hongan-ji organization, especially from other Pure Land sects like Ji-shu, Ikkō-shū, Senju-ji and Bukkō-ji. According to Dobbins, Rennyo also "oversaw the development of an extensive network of temples and congregations under the Honganji." This network provided the Hongan-ji with yearly donations that economically supported the temple organization. Through Rennyo's efforts, the Hongan-ji became the largest and most powerful Shin sect in Japan, a religious force to be reckoned with. The Shin clergy wore official robes, but unlike in other sects, they were allowed to marry and have families, as well as eat meat and drink alcohol. Rennyo himself married five times and had twenty-seven children, many of whom became clerics. He also drank sake and served it to guests.

During this time, Rennyo also established a new form of liturgy (gongyō), incorporating elements that would eventually become the core of Honganji Jōdo Shinshū Buddhism. One example was the incorporation of the chanting the Shōshinge as a major element of Shin liturgy. Rennyo saw this text as an ideal summary of the main teachings of Pure Land Buddhism and so he recommended it as the best chant for daily devotion. He further incorporated Shinran's hymsn (wasans) into regular services. Rennyo also made scrolls with the six character name Namo Amida Butsu the standard for all dōjōs, and he spent long hours personally inscribing many scrolls for dissemination. The Hōonkō service was also revamped and transformed by Rennyo, who made it into a mass service with new elements based around "exhortation, admonition, confession and, and even conversion." Rennyo also rewrote many Buddhist texts into kana, the simple, phonetic Japanese characters, making the texts more accessible for the common person.

In 1496, Rennyo sought solitude and retired to a rural area at the mouth of the Yodo River, where he built a small hermitage. The area was known for its "long slope," or "Ō-saka" (大阪) in Japanese. Contemporary documents about Rennyo's life and his hermitage were thus the first to refer to this place by the name Osaka. Rennyo's isolation did not last long, however; his hermitage grew quickly into a temple and surrounding temple town (jinaimachi) as devotees gathered to pay him homage and to hear his teachings. By the time of Rennyo's death three years later (in 1499), the complex had come to be known as the Ishiyama Hongan-ji, and was close to the final shape which would prove to be the greatest fortified temple in Japanese history.

== Teachings ==
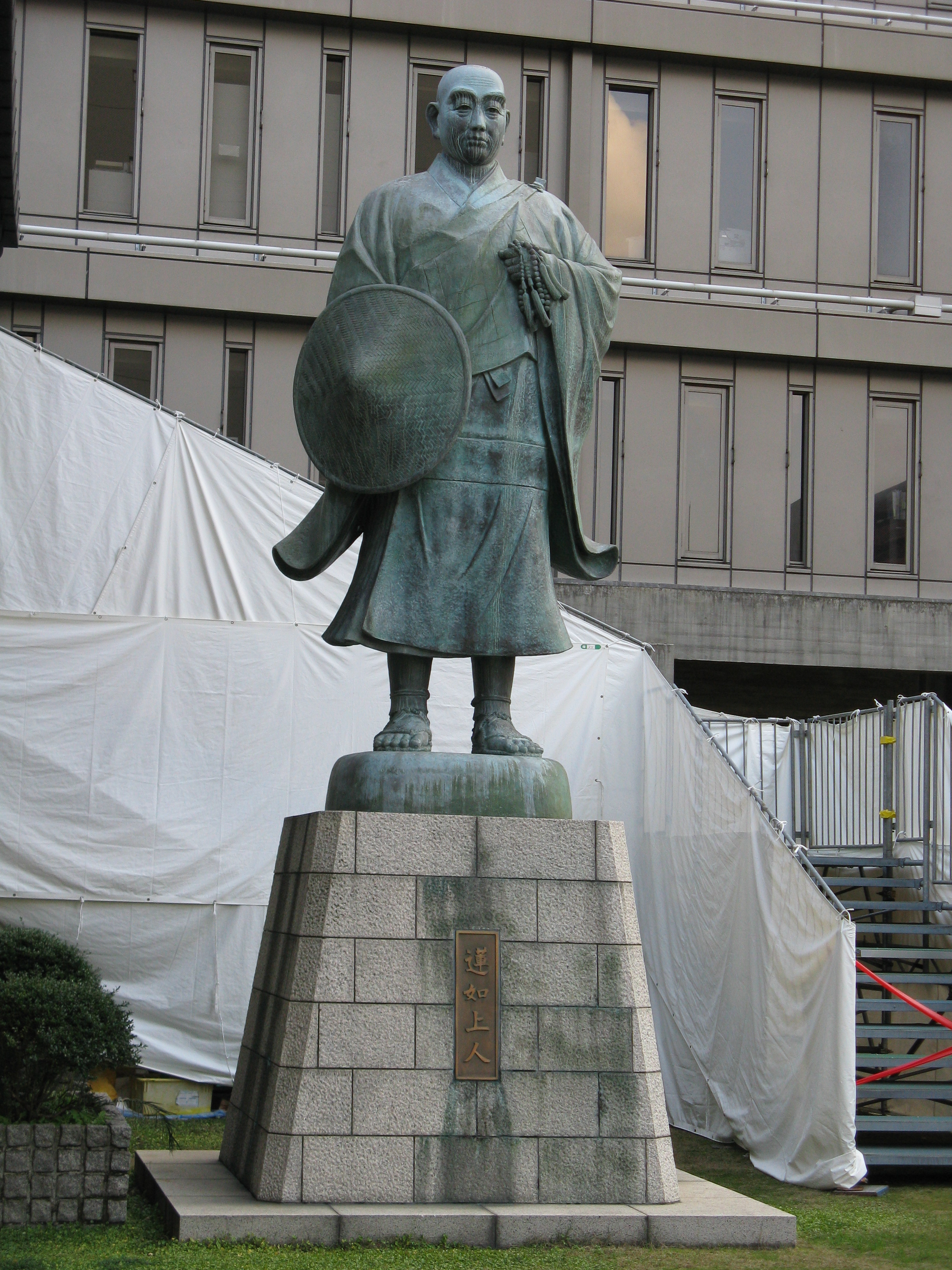
Rennyo statue at Honganji tsumura betsuin

Rennyo believed he was restoring his ancestor Shinran's original teachings and follows Shinran's views closely. He was a creative thinker in his own right, though he did not so much innovate new doctrines as found ways to popularize and synthesize past Shin Buddhist teachings using vernacular language and idioms. According to Dobbins, "his greatest accomplishment was to render Shinran's doctrinal abstractions into simple religious formulas accessible to the humblest believer and to explain them in the context of daily devotional practices."

Rennyo summed up the Shin Buddhist worldview in a short creed known as the Ryōgemon (領解文; "Statement of Conviction"):

We abandon all indiscriminate religious practices and undertakings (zōgyō zasshu) and all mind of self-assertion (jiriki no kokoro), we rely with singleness of heart on the Tathāgata Amida in that matter of utmost importance to us now—to please save us in our next lifetime. We rejoice in knowing that our birth in the Pure Land is assured and our salvation established from the moment we rely [on the Buddha] with even a single nembutsu (ichinen), and that whenever we utter the Buddha's name thereafter it is an expression of gratitude and indebtedness to him. We gratefully acknowledge that for us to hear and understand this truth we are indebted to our founder and master [Shinran] for appearing in the world and to successive generations of religious teachers in our tradition for their profound encouragement. We shall henceforth abide by our established rules (okite) as long as we shall live. --Translation by Professor James C. Dobbins.

The Ryōgemon is still recited in modern-day Shinshū liturgy as a summation of Shin Buddhist beliefs. It captures Rennyo's basic message: true faith (shinjin) is the true cause of birth in the Pure Land, reciting the nembutsu is an expression of gratitude. Rennyo repeatedly explained these basic points in his letters, such as in the following:

If we have deep faith in the principal vow of the Tathāgata Amida, if we rely with single and undivided heart on the compassionate vow of the one Buddha Amida, and if our faith is true at the very moment that we think of him to please save us, then we will definitely be received into the salvation of the Tathāgata. Over and above this, what should we take to be the meaning of reciting the nembutsu? It is a response coming from one’s indebtedness [to the Buddha] (goon hōsha), thanking him that one is saved through birth in Pure Land by the power of faith in the present. As long as we have life in us, we should say the nembutsu thinking of it as a response of thankfulness. It should be said by the person of faith (shinjin) who is established in the faith (anjin) of our tradition.

However, Rennyo's teaching also differed from Shinran's in subtle ways. Rennyo frequently used the term anjin (安心; "peace of mind") alongside the term shinjin (信心; "true-entrusting") that Shinran used. While they are similar, Rennyo's nuanced use of the term seems to indicate subtle differences between anjin and shinjin. According to Dobbins, the term "the anjin of our tradition" was often used to refer to the "whole range of attitudes and experiences that arise in the life of the believer." Since anjin literally means "mind at peace", it conveys the idea that shinjin leads to a sense of calm and assurance.

Regarding the nembutsu, he also explained it as the "confirmation" (shishō) that we are definitely saved by Amida Buddha. Rennyo further elaborated on the notion of the unity of Amida Buddha and sentient beings (kihō ittai 機法一体) expressed by the nembutsu. He drew these ideas from the Anjin Ketsujō Shō, a Seizan text he was devoted to studying for forty years. Rennyo explained this view of nembutsu as follows:

What it means for faith to be established (shinjin ketsujō) is for one to understand completely the significance of the six characters Namu Amida Butsu. The two characters Namu stand for sentient beings of limited capacity (ki) who have faith in Amida Buddha, and the four characters Amida Butsu signify that Amida Tathāgata of absolute truth (hō) saves sentient beings. Hence, the meaning is that in Namu Amida Butsu, those of limited capacity and that of absolute truth are [united] as one substance (kihō itta)...

Rennyo thus emphasized how every invocation of the nembutsu expressed gratitude at being assured rebirth in the Pure Land of Amitabha Buddha. He saw it as a sign of our assured salvation by Amida as well as a sign of our being united with Amida. As Dobbins writes, "it symbolizes the unification of the saver and the saved, and it thus comprises both the reason for faith and the result of faith." In his letters, he thus described the nembutsu as the best way of showing thanks to Amida for our liberation, and the best way to express our "indebtedness to the Buddha" (go-on hōsha).

Another popular theme that Rennyo adopted into his teachings was the idea that the devotee should "rely on the Buddha to please save me" (tasuke tamae to tanomu), an attitude he equated to faith itself. He saw this widespread and popular expression as an easy way to explain the Shin faith to the common people, writing that "no matter how uneducated sentient beings may be, if they hear this they will attain faith. In our tradition there is no other teaching besides this." Rennyo thus adopted this common phrase which was used in other Pure Land sects, and explained it to his followers using Shin ideas, as can be seen in the following passage:

When people understand clearly what our tradition teaches, they realize that they will be born in the Pure Land of bliss. These people will comprehend, first of all, faith which comes from [Amida’s] power (tariki no shinjin). What is the essence of this faith that comes from [Amida’s] power? It is the awareness that ordinary beings of misery such as ourselves can easily go to Pure Land. And what form does this faith coming from [Amida’s] power take? Without any ado whatsoever, we simply rely (tanomitamaetsurite) on Amida Tathāgata intently, single-mindedly, and with oneness of heart and we think “Please save me!” (tasuke tamae). From that very moment Amida Tathāgata unfailingly sends forth his light to embrace us, and we are enveloped in that light as long as we reside here in Saṃsāra. This is the state wherein our birth in Pure Land is assured.

Rennyo's view of this phrase is distinctively Shin and sees it as indicating one's abandoning all self-power to solely rely on Amida. It differs from how it is used in the Chinzei branch of Jōdo-shū, where it is seen as a constant mental act that, together with the constant recitation of nembutsu, leads to birth in the Pure Land.

Apart from these doctrinal teachings, Rennyo also de-emphasized the traditional Shin prohibition against the veneration of Shinto kami and other Buddhist deities, since he saw them as manifestations of the Buddha Amida.

=== Fivefold method ===
An important Shin practice taught by Rennyo is the "fivefold method" (gojūgi 五重義) which relies on past good conditions (shukuzen 宿善), meeting a good teacher (zenchishiki 善知識), Amida’s light (kōmyō 光明), faith (shinjin 信心); and the Name (myōgō 名号). According to Rennyo, while it is not necessary to rely on intellectual knowledge or wisdom to gain shinjin, the simple recitation of nembutsu without "understanding", and a "comprehension of the origin of the Primal Vow" is also not fruitful and will not lead to birth. This understanding is ultimately a transcendent awareness which he describes as "an endowment of the other-power of the Buddha’s wisdom".

For Rennyo, engaging in active discourse about the Pure Land Dharma with a good teacher is an important part of the path to this wisdom. A good teacher must first examine the student and determine if they may be receptive to the Shin Dharma (which would mean they have good roots from past lives). Then the teacher and the student will ideally engage in frequent discussions that cover all aspects of Shin other-power faith. Students are encouraged to ask all questions they have and to address their doubts as well as to reflect on the teachings they have heard. In the absence of teachers, Rennyo encouraged reading the classic Shin scriptures and reflecting on the teachings found in them. All of this encountering and active engagement with the Dharma is termed “hearing” (monpō 聞法), and it is seen as a key element of the Shin path.

This supports the next steps of the fivefold method, in which one hears and says the Buddha's name with faith and understanding. While faith itself is not conceptual nor intellectual, dialogue and proper understanding naturally guides us to true faith (as a finger points to the moon). This faith is none other than a true intuitive knowing of the working of the nembutsu, which is also expressed as being the unity of sentient beings and the Buddha.

== Writings and Liturgy ==
As part of Rennyo's reforms, he elevated the status of Shinran's hymn, the Shōshinge (正信偈; "Hymn of the True Faith"), which was originally printed in Shinran's magnum opus, the Kyogyoshinsho. The Shoshinge is the primary liturgy used in Jodo Shinshu services, apart from Buddhist sutras, and is recited every morning at 6:00 at the Nishi Honganji temple services.

Further, Rennyo Shonin was the author of several works relating to Jōdo Shinshū doctrine. His most influential work is his collection of letters to various Shinshu monto (lay groups), popularly known as Gobunshō (御文章; "Compositions") in the Nishi Hongan-ji tradition, and Ofumi (御文; "Compositions") in the Higashi Hongan-ji tradition. These letters have the status of scriptural texts and are traditionally used in Shinshu daily liturgy; the most well-known letter is the Hakkotsu no Sho (白骨の書; "Letter on White Ashes") which is a reflection on the impermanence of life and the importance of relying on Amida Buddha's Vow. This letter is frequently read aloud during Jōdo Shinshū funeral services.

Rennyo's disciples also recorded things he said in a collection called the Goichidai Kikigaku (御一代記聞書; "A Record of Things Heard"), which provides later followers with some insight into his personality and beliefs.

A list of key works included in the Shinshu Seiten canon include:

- Outline of the Shōshinge [正信偈大意]
- Commentary on the Shōshinge [正信偈註]
- The Letters (Ofumi, a.k.a. Gobunshō) (5 fascicles) [御文章 (五帖)]
- On the Master's Secular Surname [御俗姓]
- Summer Letters [夏御文章]
- Ryōge-mon [領解文]
- Collection of Letters [御文章集成]
- Record of Hearings on the Life of Rennyo Shōnin [蓮如上人御一代記聞書]
- Collection of Rennyo Shōnin's Words and Deeds [蓮如上人言行録集成]
- Collection of Rennyo Shōnin's Waka Poems [蓮如上人和歌集成]

== Legacy ==
According to Dobbins, Rennyo's "most obvious" accomplishment was "the transformation of Shinshū from a secondary religious movement into a formidable Buddhist school in Japan." Rennyo clarified Shinran's teachings, provided a simple code of conduct, and reformed the temple hierarchy and liturgy. During Rennyo's tenure the tradition received many new converts, leading to a much larger organization with many more congregations and temples than had existed prior to Rennyo's leadership. This led the Hongan-ji school to become of the great religious and political forces in 16th century Japan. Such was Rennyo's importance in reviving Shinran's teachings that he is revered by the Hongan-ji traditions as the "second founder" of Jōdo Shinshū. Rennyo's image is typically venerated in Hongan-ji shrines to the left of Amitābha Buddha (while Shinran is usually enshrined to the right).

Rennyo is also responsible for his formulation of Shin Buddhist doctrine, which represents the culmination of earlier Shin Buddhist doctrinal development. Rennyo's doctrine became the orthodox doctrine for the Hongan-ji sect and it was not until the modern era that we see innovations to his orthodoxy. Indeed, as Dobbins writes, none of the points of doctrine found in the Shinshū Anjin Rondai (Points of Faith, a short modern Shin catechism) come from a time after Rennyo. As such, Rennyo is the last Shin truly innovative thinker who is considered part of the orthodoxy.

Rennyo is also credited with bringing Shinshū teachings to a wider audience through proselytization and religious instruction. This was often accomplished through preaching tours and through his letters, which provided accessible, clear explanations of Shin doctrine in a way which was easier to understand than the writings of Shinran. Rennyo also helped make Shin Buddhism more socially acceptable.

There is debate among scholars belonging to the sect as to whether Rennyo's legacy was good for the Jōdo Shinshū or not. On the one hand, Rennyo gave the disorganized Shinshū movement a coherent structure, translated Shinran's teachings into simpler language, and developed a common liturgy. On the other hand, the process of institutionalization that Rennyo accelerated arguably departed from Shinshū's original egalitarianism, and led to a disjunction between priest-scholars and lay devotees contrary to Shinran's intentions. Rennyo also introduced certain doctrinal elements from the rival Seizan Jōdo-Shū tradition into the Shinshū, and tolerated Shinto belief in kami to a greater extent than Shinran had.

Furthermore, all Jōdo Shinshū sects that have remained independent of the Hongan-ji, such as the Senju-ji sect, do not recognize Rennyo's reforms and innovations at part of their tradition. So Rennyo's influence on these Shin other sects, when there was any, was mostly scholastic. As such, Rennyo's influence was directly focused on Hongan-ji Shin Buddhism.

His 500th memorial service was observed in 1998. (see Dobbins & Rogers references below.)

== Bibliography ==
- Sansom, George Bailey. (1958). A History of Japan to 1334. Stanford: Stanford University Press. ISBN 978-0-8047-0523-3; OCLC 224793047
- Dobbins, James C. (1989). Jodo Shinshu: Shin Buddhism in Medieval Japan. Bloomington, Illinois: Indiana University Press. ISBN 9780253331861; OCLC 470742039
- Rogers, Minor and Ann (1991), Rennyo: The Second Founder of Shin Buddhism: with a Translation of his Letters, Berkeley, Calif.: Asian Humanities Press, ISBN 0895819295
- Blum, Mark L. and Yasutomi Shin'ya, ed. (2006). Rennyo and the Roots of Modern Japanese Buddhism. Oxford University Press. ISBN 9780195132755 OCLC 79864423
- Ducor, Jérôme (1998). "La vie de Rennyo (1415–1499)"; The Rennyo Shônin Reader (ed. by Institute of Jodo-Shinshu Studies and Hongwanji International Center; Kyoto, Jōdo-Shinshū Hongwanji-ha International Center, 1998), p. 57–90.
- Shojun Bandō, Harold Stewart, Ann T. Rogers, Minor L. Rogers (trans.): Tannishō: Passages Deploring Deviations of Faith and Rennyo Shōnin Ofumi: The Letters of Rennyo, Berkeley: Numata Center for Buddhist Translation and Research 1996. ISBN 1-886439-03-6
- Elson Snow, trans. (1994). Goichidaiki-kikigaki: Sayings of Rennyo Shonin, Pacific World Journal, New Series, Number 10, 1–55
