= Shugo =

Title given to certain officials in feudal Japan

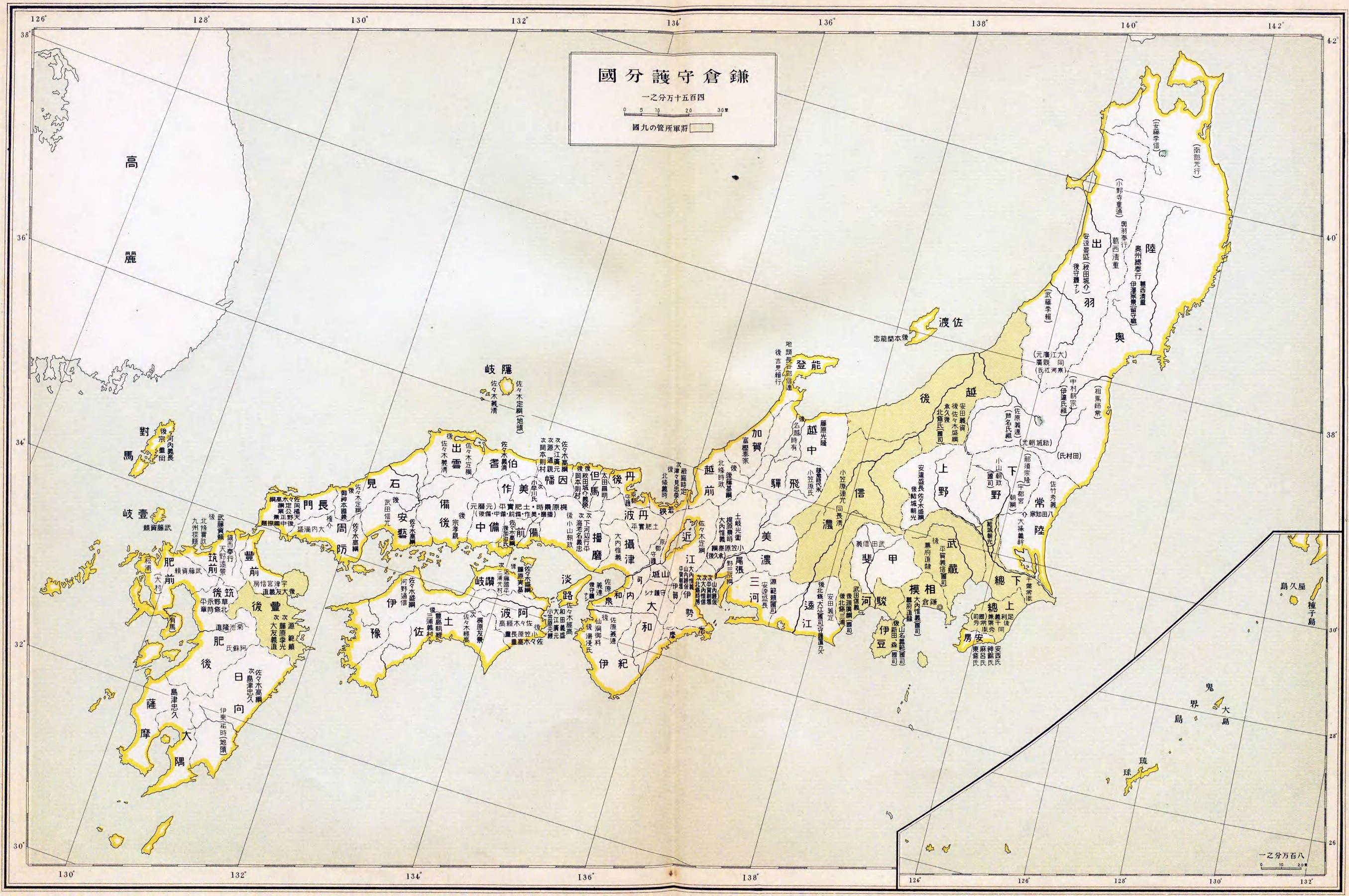
A map of shugo territories from the Kamakura period

Shugo (守護), commonly translated as '[military] governor', 'protector', or 'constable', was a title given to certain officials in feudal Japan. They were each appointed by the shogun to oversee one or more of the provinces of Japan. The position gave way to the emergence of the daimyo (military feudal lords) in the late 15th century, as shugo began to claim power over lands themselves, rather than serving simply as governors on behalf of the shogunate.

== History ==
The post is said to have been created in 1185 by shogun Minamoto no Yoritomo to aid the capture of Yoshitsune, with the additional motivation of extending the rule of the Minamoto shogunate government throughout Japan. The shugo (military governors) progressively supplanted the existing kokushi (civil governors), who were appointed by the Imperial Court in Kyoto. Officially, the gokenin in each province were supposed to serve the shugo, but in practice, the relationship between them was fragile, as the gokenin were vassals of the shōgun as well.

Shugo often stayed for long periods in the capital, far from their province, and were sometimes appointed shugo for several provinces at the same time. In such cases, a deputy shugo, or shugodai (守護代), was appointed.

Following the establishment of the Ashikaga shogunate, the authority of the Shugo expanded rapidly. While the Shugo had been responsible for punishing murderers, putting down rebellions and providing guard duty during the Kamakura period, they now gained jurisdiction over land-related matters. This gave them almost complete military and administrative authority over the provinces. Another difference was the practice of splitting the role between two people. The Shugo office could be divided into district-level units, enabling several shugo to be installed in a single province at the same time. The shogunate used this system to counteract the growing power of individual Shugo.

Over time, the powers of some shugo grew considerably. Around the time of the Ōnin War (1467–1477), conflicts between shugo became common. Some shugo lost their powers to subordinates such as the shugodai, while others strengthened their grip on their territories. As a result, at the end of the 15th century, the beginning of the Sengoku period, the power in the country was divided amongst military lords of various kinds (shugo, shugodai, and others), who came to be called daimyōs.

== List of shugo and daimyō clans ==
Below is a list of some of the major clans that produced shugos and daimyōs during the Muromachi era and Sengoku period, as well as the regions over which they ruled. The clans in bold indicate branches of the Ashikaga clan.

- Akamatsu clan – Settsu, Harima, Mimasaka, and Bizen provinces
- Amago clan – Izumo, Hoki, Inaba, Mimasaka, Bizen, Bitchu, Bingo, and Oki provinces
- Asakura clan – Echizen Province
- Aso clan – Higo Province
- Chiba clan – Shimotsuke Province
- Date clan – Mutsu Province
- **Hatakeyama clan** – Kawachi, Noto, Etchu, Kii and Yamashiro provinces
- **Hosokawa clan** – Izumi, Settsu, Tanba, Bitchu, Awaji, Awa, Sanuki, Iyo, and Tosa provinces
- **Imagawa clan** – Totomi, and Suruga provinces
- **Isshiki clan** – Mikawa, Wakasa, Tango, Ise, Shima, Yamashiro, and Owari provinces
- Kikuchi clan – Higo Province
- Kitabatake clan – Ise Province
- Kyogoku clan – Izumo, Oki, and Hida provinces
- Mōri clan – Aki, Suo, Nagato, Bingo, and Bitchu provinces
- **Nitsuki clan** – Iga Province
- Ogasawara clan – Shinano and Awa provinces
- Otomo clan – Bungo Province, Buzen Province and Chikugo provinces
- Ouchi clan – Iwami, Aki, Suo, Nagato, Chikuzen, and Buzen provinces
- Rokkaku clan – Omi Province
- Satake clan – Hitachi Province
- **Shiba clan** – Owari, Echizen, Totomi, Etchu, Kaga and Shinano provinces
- Shimazu clan – Hyuga, Osumi, and Satsuma provinces
- Shoni clan – Chikuzen, Hizen, and Buzen provinces
- So clan – Tsushima Province
- Takeda clan – Kai, Shinano, Aki and Wakasa provinces
- Toki clan – Mino Province
- Uesugi clan – Sagami, Izu, Kazusa, Musashi, Kozuke, and Echigo provinces
- Yamana clan – Tajima, Inaba, Hoki, Iwami, Bingo, Aki, Harima, and Mimasaka provinces
- Yuki clan – Shimotsuke Province
