= Kaga Province =

Former province of Japan

Kaga Province 加賀国
- pre-Meiji period Japan
- 823–1871
- Map of Japanese provinces (1868) with Kaga Province highlighted
- Capital: Komatsu
- Area
  - Coordinates: 36°24′N 136°30′E
- History
  - Split from Koshi: 823
  - Disestablished: 1871
- Today part of: Ishikawa Prefecture

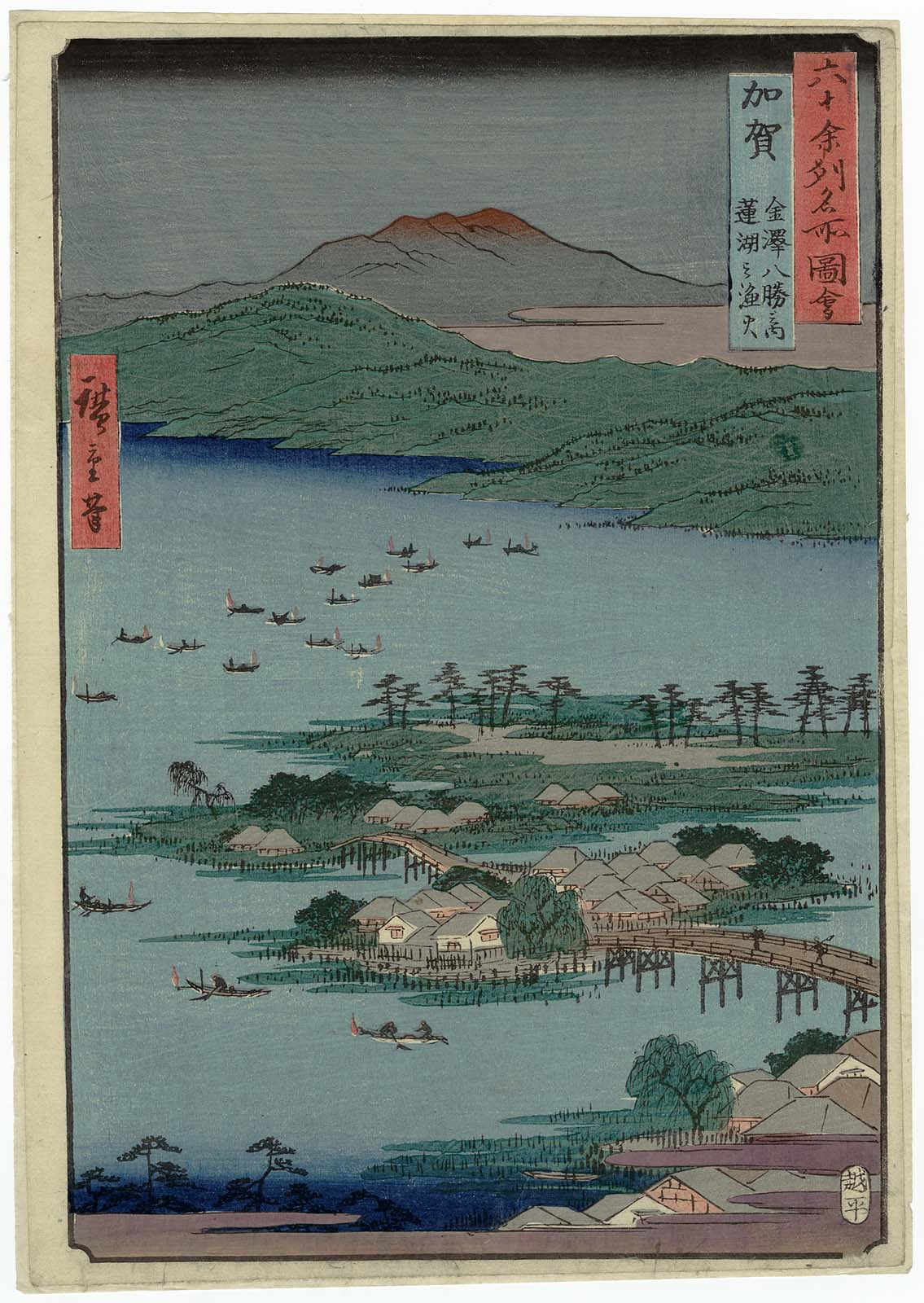
Hiroshige ukiyo-e "Kaga" in "The Famous Scenes of the Sixty States" (六十余州名所図会), depicting fishing fires on Lake Renko

Kaga Province (加賀国, Kaga no Kuni; Japanese pronunciation: [kä́.ɡä̀ (nò̞ kɯ̈̀.ɲ̟ì), -ŋä̀ (nò̞ kɯ̈̀.ɲ̟ì)]) was a province of Japan in the area that is today the south and western portion of Ishikawa Prefecture in the Hokuriku region of Japan. Kaga bordered on Echizen, Etchū, Hida, and Noto Provinces. It was part of Hokurikudō Circuit. Its abbreviated form name was Kashū (加州).

== History ==
Koshi Province (越国, Koshi no Kuni) was an ancient province of Japan and is listed as one of the original provinces in the Nihon Shoki. The region as a whole was sometimes referred to as Esshū (越州). In 701 AD, per the reforms of the Taihō Code, Koshi was divided into three separate provinces: Echizen, Etchū, and Echigo.

In 823 AD, the two eastern districts of Echizen Province (Kaga and Enuma) were separated to form Kaga Province. Kaga was thus the last province to be created under the ritsuryō system. The same year, the northern portion of Enuma District became Nomi District, and the southern portion on Kaga District became Ishikawa District. Kaga District itself was renamed Kahoku District.

The provincial capital and provincial temple were located in what is now the city of Komatsu; however, there does not appear to have been a provincial nunnery. The Ichinomiya of the province is the Shirayama Hime Shrine in what is now the city of Hakusan. Under the Engishiki classification system, Kaga was ranked as a "superior country" (上国) in terms of importance and "middle country" (中国) in terms of distance from the capital. Despite this classification, Kaga never developed a powerful local gōzoku clan but was divided into many shōen estates.

During the early Sengoku period, the province was largely under the control of the Ikkō-ikki, who established a loosely governed confederation in the province. The area was eventually conquered by Oda Nobunaga's general Shibata Katsuie and subsequently came under the control of Maeda Toshiie under the rule of Toyotomi Hideyoshi. The Maeda clan retained control of the province as part of Kaga Domain during the Edo period Tokugawa shogunate. From 1639, Enuma Domain and a portion of Nomi Domain were separated from Kaga Domain into the 100,000 koku Daishōji Domain, which was ruled by a junior branch of the Maeda clan.

Following the Meiji Restoration and the abolition of the han system in 1871, Kaga Province was divided into Kanazawa Prefecture and Daishōji Prefecture, which were merged with Fukui Prefecture. However, only a few months later in 1872, Kanazawa and Daishōji were divided back out and merged with Nanao Prefecture (the former Noto Province) to form today's Ishikawa Prefecture. In 1876, former Etchū Province was united with Ishikawa, only to become separated again in 1883.

== Historical districts ==
Kaga Province consisted of four districts:

- Ishikawa Prefecture
  - Enuma District (江沼郡) – dissolved
  - Ishikawa District (石川郡) – dissolved
  - Kahoku District (河北郡)
  - Nomi District (能美郡)

== Bakumatsu period domains ==
#	Name	type	daimyō	kokudaka
	Kaga Domain	tozama	Maeda clan	1,030,000 koku
	Daishōji Domain	tozama	Maeda clan	100,000 koku

== See also ==
- Japanese aircraft carrier Kaga, aircraft carrier of the Imperial Japanese Navy during World War II named after the province.
- JS Kaga, a helicopter carrier of the Japan Maritime Self-Defense Force currently in the process of being converted into a light aircraft carrier. Also named after the province.
