= Gōhime =

Gōhime 豪姫
- Maeda clan emblem

Personal details
- Born: July, 1574
- Died: 1634 (aged 59–60)
- Spouse: Ukita Hideie
- Children: Ukita Hideitaka; Ukita Hideetsugu; Yuki no Kata
- Parents: Maeda Toshiie (father); Maeda Matsu (mother)

Military service
- Allegiance: Toyotomi clan
- Unit: Maeda clan

Gōhime (豪姫, July 1574 – June 18, 1634) was a Japanese noble woman and a member of the Maeda clan who lived during the transition from the Sengoku period to the early Edo period. She played a significant role as the lawful wife of Ukita Hideie and was the fourth daughter of Maeda Toshiie and Maeda Matsu. Gōhime was also known as Toyotomi Hideyoshi's adopted daughter and held various titles such as Hashiba no Tsubone, Bizen no Kata, and Kyō. She took the baptismal name "Maria."

== Biography ==
Gōhime was born in 1574 as the fourth daughter of Maeda Toshiie, a retainer of the Oda clan, in Arako, Owari Province (present-day Nagoya City, Aichi Prefecture). Her mother was Matsu (also known as Hōshun-in).

When she was two, her father Toshiie, in an effort to strengthen his ties with Hashiba Hideyoshi (later known as Toyotomi Hideyoshi), who had no children of his own, offered Gōhime to be adopted as Hideyoshi's daughter. Gōhime became cherished by Hideyoshi and his wife Nene as their adopted child. This decision to adopt a two-year-old child into Hideyoshi's family demonstrates the trust and goodwill between Toshiie and Hideyoshi.

=== Marriage to Ukita Hideie ===
In 1588, Gōhime was married to Ukita Hideie, a daimyo of Bizen Province (present-day Okayama prefecture) and lord of Okayama Castle. Initially referred to as "Bizen no Kata," her title was changed to "Minami no Kata" in 1591. Gōhime and Hideie had children, including Hidetaka, Hidetsugu, and Yuki no Kata, who first married Yamazaki Nagatomo and later Tomita Nobutaka. However, their marriage faced challenges due to political events.

=== Sekigahara Campaign ===
When Hideyoshi died, Toshiie also died some time later, so Japan, which had been unified under the Toyotomi clan, split into two factions, causing civil war again. The two factions were split between the Western army led by Ishida Mitsunari and the Eastern army led by Tokugawa Ieyasu, the struggle between these two army became known as the Sekigahara Campaign

The Western army was made up of Toyotomi clan loyalists, while the Eastern army was made up of Ieyasu's supporters. The Maeda clan was divided between both armies, Gohime who was Ukita Hideie's wife and Maeda Toshimasa (Gohime's brother) were part of the Western army, while Maeda Chiyo (Gohime's sister), her husband Hosokawa Tadakata and their brother Maeda Toshinaga were part of the Eastern army. Gohime's Mother, Maeda Matsu, who was known at the time for supporting the stabilization of the Toyotomi and Maeda clan, voluntarily went to Edo (Capital of the Tokugawa clan) as a hostage in order for Ieyasu to spare the Maeda clan from any post- battle penalties.

Prior to the Battle of Sekigahara, Ishida Mitsunari planned to capture Gohime's sister's mother-in-law Hosokawa Gracia as a hostage. When the Hosokawa residence was surrounded by Mitsunari's soldiers, Gracia advised Chiyo to escape. Chiyo fled the residence in Ōsaka in a carriage to the Ukita residence where Gōhime, lived. When the Western army approached Gracia's mansion, she asked her servant to kill her and set her residence on fire. Gracia's death caused much chaos, and damaged Ishida Mitsunari's reputation, which ultimately led to his defeat at the Battle of Sekigahara. After the Western Army's defeat, the Ukita clan faced confiscation and was exiled. Hideie, along with his two sons, was granted clemency on the condition of permanent exile. In 1606, they were exiled to Hachijō-jima, an isolated island.

=== Exile and Life in Kanazawa ===
After the fall of the Ukita clan, Gōhime relocated to Kanazawa, Ishikawa Prefecture, around 1607. At that time, she was accompanied by her attendants, Nakamura Keibe and Isshiki Shusen, and received a stipend of 1,500 koku as a form of compensation. She resided in the Kanazawa Nishimachi area. It was during this period that she converted to Christianity, and her faith was supported by Naito Julia. She received the Christian name "Maria." Gohime's husband, Ukita Hideie, was kept in exile along with their children and many other loyal followers of the Ukita family. She sought refuge with the Maeda clan and was able to correspond and send gifts (rice, sake, clothing) to her husband and sons from there.

=== Later life and death ===
In May 1634, Gōhime died at the age of 61. She was given the posthumous name "Jushō Daizenshō-Ni" and was laid to rest at the Jōrin-ji Temple in Kanazawa City. The funeral was attended by many who had ties to the Ukita clan, including Nakamura Keibe and Isshiki Shusen. In addition to her grave in Kanazawa, there is also a family grave at Kōzan Park in Yamaguchi Prefecture, near the Mōri family's gravesite. Gohime's husband was once offered a conditional pardon after Ieyasu's death, but he declined and never returned to Japan. Gohime had already died, the Toyotomi were defeated in 1615, there was nowhere to go back, their children had children in Hachijojima and the Shogunate would be inherited by members of the Tokugawa clan.

== Anecdotes ==
In 1595, Gōhime's frequent illnesses during childbirth were believed to be the result of possession by a fox spirit. To address this, her adoptive father Hideyoshi ordered a fox hunt, which included a performance of Naihōsō no Mikagura. According to accounts, the fox spirit was vanquished by Toshiie's sword, Sanemitsu.

In 1615, Gōhime arranged for her own pre-death funeral. In 2021, her tomb was discovered at Kōzan Park in Yamaguchi prefecture. Despite her Christian faith, it is suggested that her natural mother, Hōshun-in, encouraged her connection to Kōzan Park. However, some believe that the tomb was constructed by a member of the Toyotomi family rather than Gōhime herself.

== Family ==
- Husband: Ukita Hideie
- Children: Ukita Hideitaka, Ukita Hideetsugu, Yuki no Kata (married Yamazaki Nagatomo and Tomita Nobutaka)

Gōhime's life was marked by her unique position as a political pawn, a devoted wife and mother, and her enduring faith in Christianity during a tumultuous period in Japan's history.

== Sources ==
- Iwasawa Yoshihiko, Maeda Toshiie (new edition), Yoshikawa Kobunkan, 1988.
- Yasumasa Onishi, "The Noble Princess," Okayama Local History Research, No. 122, 2010.
- Yasumasa Onishi "Ukita Fallow", Hiroki Nakanishi ed., Takayama Ukon, Miyaobi Publishing Co., Ltd., 2014.
- Yasumasa Onishi, "Jushoin's 'Adopted Son' Juusei-in," Ukita Family History Bulletin, No. 61, 2017.
- Sadao Tateishi, "Sengoku Ukita Clan" Shinjin Goraisha, 1988.
