= Maeda Matsu =

Japanese samurai class woman

Maeda Matsu 前田まつ
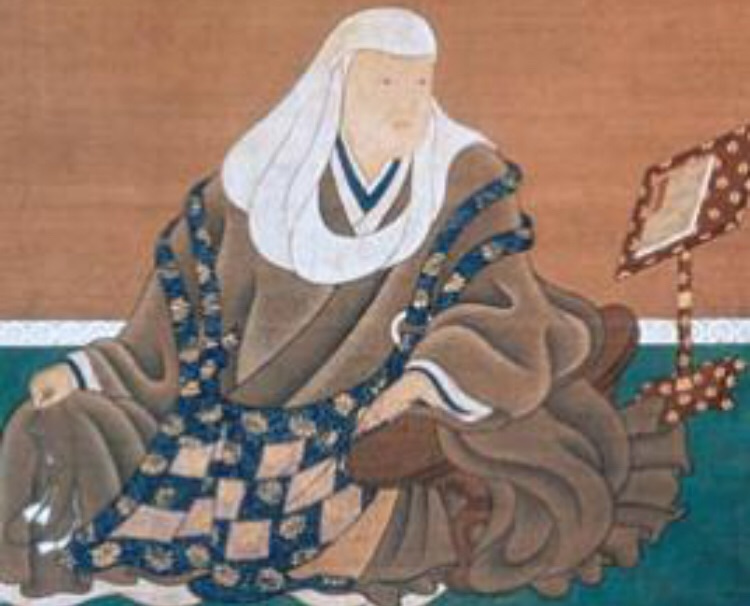
- Matsu's late portrait

Personal details
- Born: 1547
- Died: 1617 (aged 69–70)
- Spouse: Maeda Toshiie
- Children: Maeda Toshinaga; Kōhime; Sho; Maahime; Gōhime; Yome; Maeda Toshimasa; Maeda Chiyo
- Parents: Shinohara Kazue (speculation) (father); A woman from the Maeda clan (speculation) (mother)
- Relatives: Maeda Toshimasu (nephew)

Military service
- Allegiance: Oda clan Toyotomi clan Tokugawa clan
- Unit: Maeda clan

Maeda Matsu (前田まつ), also known as Omatsu no Kata (お松の方) (1547–1617), was a Japanese noblewoman and aristocrat of the 16th century. She was the wife of Maeda Toshiie, who founded the Kaga Domain. Matsu had a reputation for intelligence; she was skilled at both literary and martial arts, she fought alongside her clan. Known for her fierce determination, Matsu was vitally important to the success of the Maeda clan, being at the forefront of many political and diplomatic issues. She was eternalized for saving the Maeda clan from Tokugawa Ieyasu in Battle of Sekigahara and Siege of Osaka.

== Early life ==
Matsu has unknown origins, but speculation identifies her as the daughter of Shinohara Kazue, one of Oda Nobuhide's chief archers. Her mother was probably Maeda Toshiie's aunt, which means that she was born as Toshiie's cousin. Kazue died when Matsu was still a child, so his mother, to prevent her family from falling into poverty, married Takahata Naokichi, a retainer of the Maeda clan. These speculations are present in Hayashi-uji Nichikai Tsunenobu, written by Hayashi Tsunenobu, however, the veracity of the information about the early life of Maeda Matsu is quite questioned, due to the negative relationship that Tsunenobu had with the Oda clan.

Another speculation observed in Kagahan Shiryō notes that her father was an unidentified member of the Shinohara clan. It was also argued that she was the daughter of Shinohara Chikuami, who may or may not have family ties with the Maeda family.

== Arrival to the Maeda clan ==
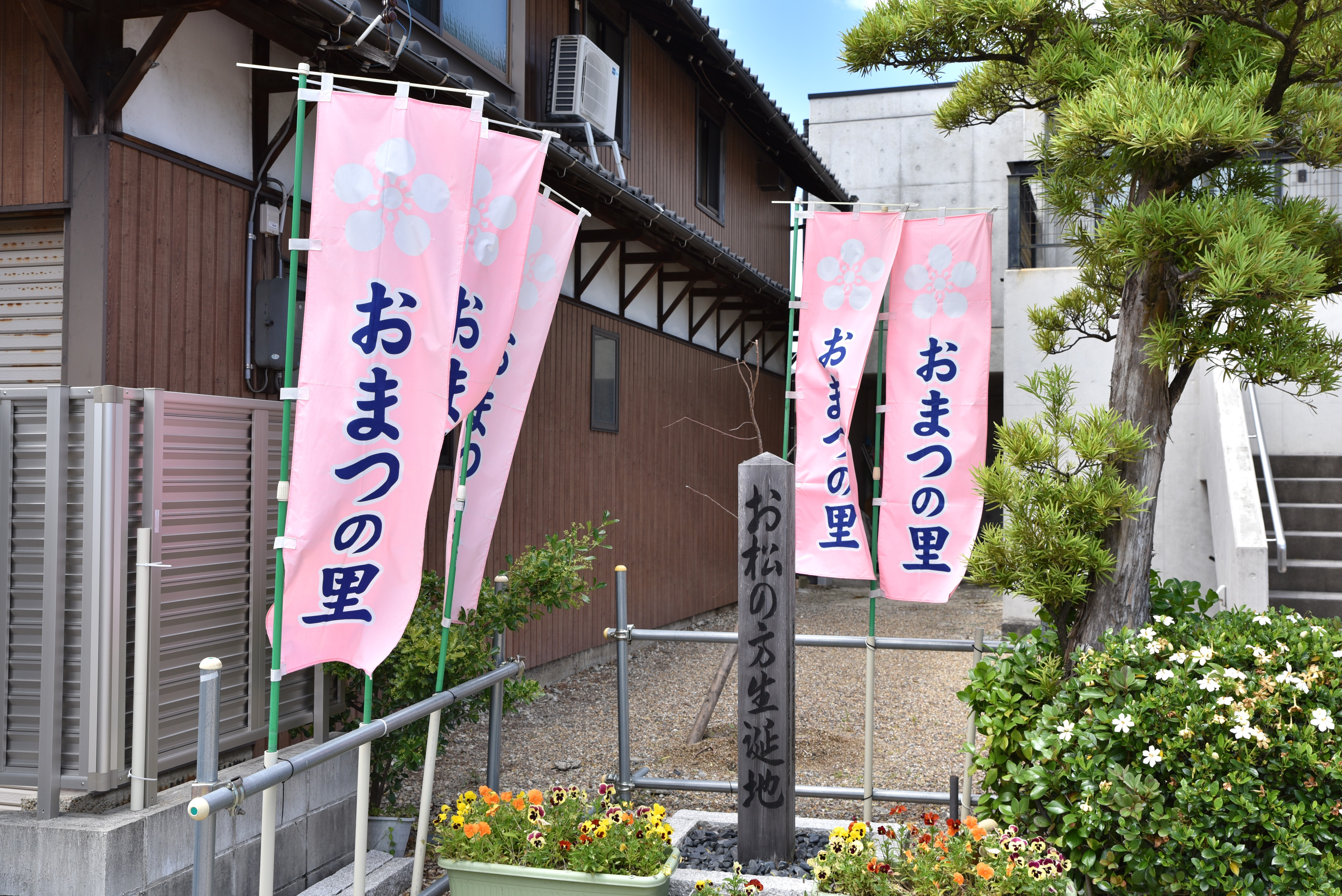
Matsu's birthplace monument in Zuienji (Aichi prefecture)

Matsu is described as a determined person from the first years of life, it is said that she refused to go to the clan that her mother would marry, choosing to be adopted by her uncle.

The only reliable source about Matsu's early career is that Maeda Toshimasa (Maeda Toshiie's father) decided to adopt her after her mother's remarriage. In 1558, when she was twelve, she married Toshiie who was 21. It was said that their love was genuine, despite the social expectations of the time for weddings and even though the wedding was only for political reasons.

During the time they spent together, she gave birth to nine daughters and two sons for him. She had her first child, Kōhime, when she was thirteen years old. She lived at Fuchu Castle in 1575 and then at Nanao Castle in 1581. As Matsu was close to the Toyotomi clan, she and her family secured a lot of power and political influence. For as long as she was married, Matsu began her lifelong friendship with Nene (Hideyoshi's wife) and Ōmandokoro (Hideyoshi's mother). These three women are said to have had a lot of political power on their own and daily participated in councils to debate the growing success that the Maeda clan and the Toyotomi clan .

Hideyoshi was born from a poor background, and he was friends with Toshiie from an early age; it is said that they both helped Omandokoro with the family's crops and shared the rewards together. Due to the closeness that Toshiie and Matsu had with members of the Toyotomi clan, Matsu offered Gōhime, her fourth daughter, to Hideyoshi and Nene who never gave birth to a child.

== Battle of Shizugatake ==
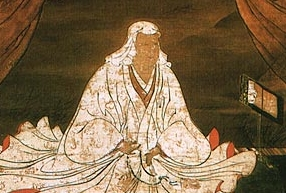
Matsu's early portrait (c.unknown).

After Nobunaga's assassination at Honnō-ji (本能寺) by Akechi Mitsuhide and Mitsuhide's subsequent defeat by Hideyoshi, Maeda clan battled Hideyoshi under Shibata Katusie's command in the Battle of Shizugatake. Because Maeda Matsu was a close friend of Nene (Hideyoshi's wife), she and Nene negotiated a peace treaty during the battle. Matsu personally advanced the battlefield and asked for mercy for the Maeda clan, Hideyoshi was thrilled with her words to spare her husband. Her act is often romanticized as a sign of devotion to Toshiie, although historians argue that it was probably an independent act of self-preservation carried out within her domain of influence.

As a samurai wife, Maeda Matsu had such political power and influence in her domain. The position of wife of a warlord was more political than marital, so Matsu is famous for being extremely skilled in fighting, in domestic and also military affairs. She actively participated in councils, accompanied the Maeda clan to the battlefield in Shizugatake and many other military expeditions.

After days of battle, Hideyoshi's victory was certain, so Katsuie committed seppuku, after killing his wife, Oichi (Nobunaga's sister) and other members of his household, and set it on fire. Matsu and Toshiie escaped Shizugatake alive, due to Matsu having asked Hideyoshi and Nene to spare Toshiie from death, she successfully kept the Maeda clan alive.

After Shibata's defeat, Toshiie worked for Hideyoshi and became one of his leading generals. Toshiie received his own properties and a new home, Kanazawa Castle. For the first time in his life, Toshiie possessed considerable wealth and sought to protect it. Then Matsu handed over her daughter, Maahime, to become Hideyoshi's concubine, thus maintaining a diplomatic relationship between the two clans.

== Siege of Suemori Castle ==
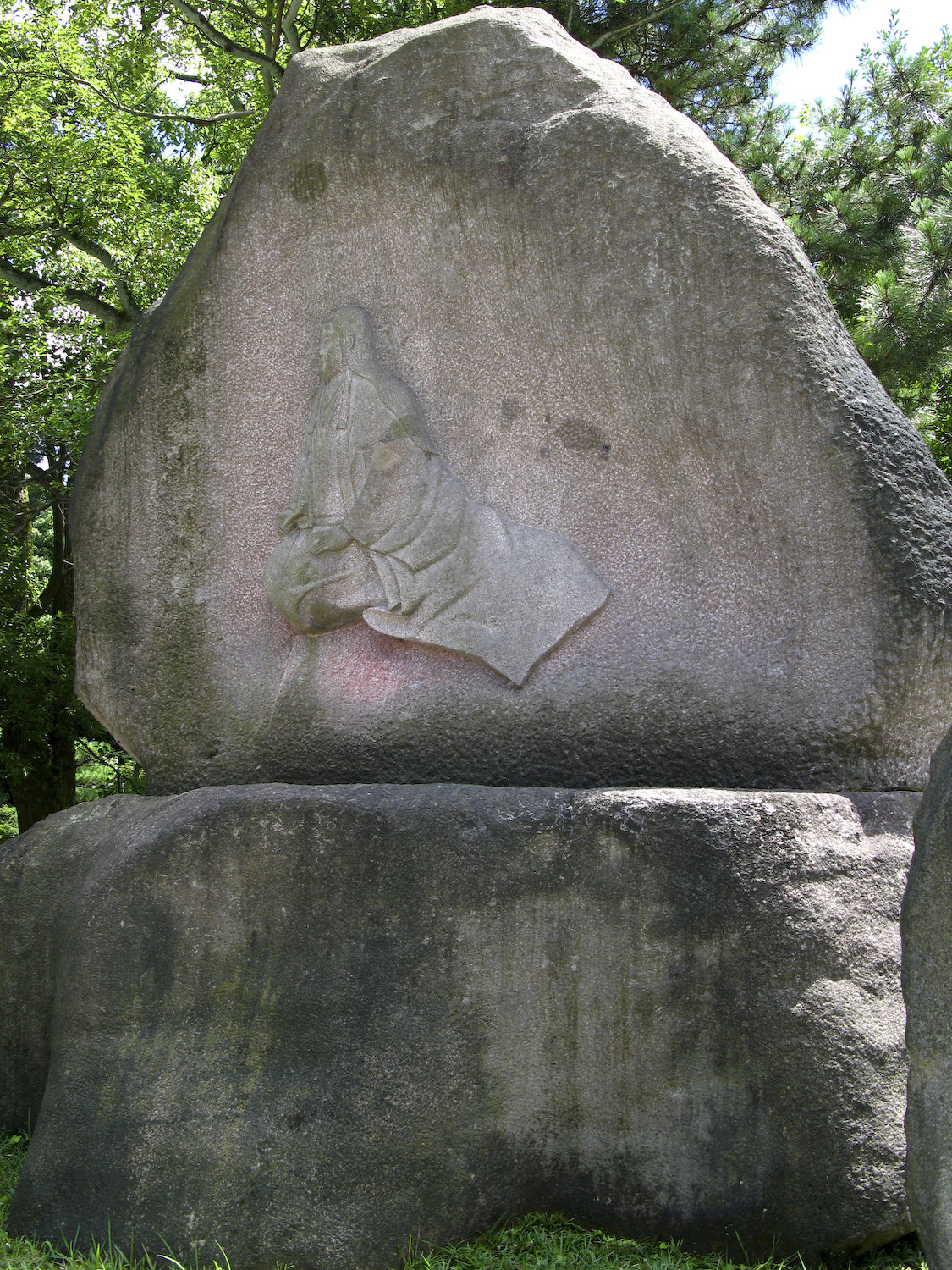
Matsu as she is depicted in a sculpture at the Oyama Shrine in Kanazawa.

According to Kawasumi Taikōki, Toshiie's greed took precedence and interrupted his daily routine. When Sassa Narimasa posed a threat to Suemori Castle in 1584, Toshiie hesitated to answer the call and risk his life in battle. Then Toshiie left the defense of the castle because of Okumura Nagatomi and his wife Katō Tsune to expel the 15,000 soldiers from the coalition of Sassa Narimasa and Tokugawa Ieyasu.

Then Maeda Matsu confronted Toshiie, mocking him, she said a phrase that became famous in history:

"How about bringing your gold and silver along by poking through them with your spear?"

At first, Toshiie was outraged by her sarcasm. While trying, he took her words as a challenge to prove himself and was reinvigorated to go to the battlefield and defend Suemori Castle. Because of Matsu's confrontation, Toshiie appeared in the battle as reinforcements, then Nagatomi and Tsune successfully managed to defend Suemori castle. With this action of Maeda Toshiie's, he became established as the most powerful daimyō in the Kaga Province. Another story about Matsu and Suemori Castle has a different take on her behavior. Before her husband and retainers left Kanazawa Castle for the siege, Matsu approached them in person and boldly announced:

"If fortune fails you at Suemori Castle, do not intend on returning home alive. Everyone here, including myself, shall set this castle ablaze and bring our families here to perish."

Matsu personally tied Toshiie's helmet with her death poem and dressed the wives of the men for death as the army left for war. Whether it be an angry spat or a decisive pledge, Matsu's words were said to have led to the Maeda's high morale in battle.

== Service under Hideyoshi ==
Hideyoshi becomes the most powerful man in Japan and begins his campaign for unification. The Maeda clan participates in several battles, until the Siege of Odawara in 1590, a battle that led to the unification of Japan in the name of Hideyoshi.

After the unification, Hideyoshi and Toshiie clashed in 1595 over the inheritance of Tsuruchiyo, a son born to one of Nobunaga's daughters (Fuyuhime) and the late Gamō Ujisato. Hideyoshi was preparing the boy to become one of his possible successors and Toshiie disapproved of him from various angles, refusing to attend Osaka castle for three years. When Matsu became aware of the situation, she appealed to Nene to listen to Toshiie's side. Nene passed the news to Hideyoshi who reflected and finally addressed the retainers' anger for leaving the Gamō clan without a successor.

Before dying in 1598, Hideyoshi named Toshiie to the council of Five Elders to support Toyotomi Hideyori until he was old enough to take control on his own. Matsu gained the position of nanny of Toyotomi Hideyori (Yodo-dono's son and Hideyoshi's successor). She was in the position of a nanny, such as attending with Hideyoshi's wife and even at the cherry blossom viewing of Daigo and became in her own a retainer of the Toyotomi clan.

During the Daigo Flower Viewing, Matsu was treated as a honored guest of the ceremony before 1,300 retainers and female attendants. She rode the sixth palanquin to the grand event. The famous Yodo-dono (Oichi's daughter and Oda Nobunaga's niece) and Kyōgoku Tatsuko were ready to wage war over who should receive the cushion seat next to Nene, a honored seat next to Hideyoshi's first wife. Matsu calmly slid onto it and replied:

"In order of whom is the oldest amongst us, I should be right here".

Ordinarily she should have been seated within the guests section, but Matsu's sagacity silenced the ladies from bickering and the event proceeded without incident. In 1598, Hideyoshi dies, leaving Hideyori in Toshiie's care, but Toshiie dies soon after. When Toshiie died, Matsu became a Buddhist nun and changed her name to Hōshun-In. Maeda Toshimasa (Matsu's second son) was given a 215,000 koku fief in Noto province after Toshiie's death.

== Battle of Sekigahara ==
After the death of Toyotomi Hideyoshi, the power of the Toyotomi clan declined and Japan would go to war again. The five regents he had appointed to rule in Hideyori's place began jockeying amongst themselves for power. When Toshiie died, the situation worsened and an armed conflict was inevitable. Hideyoshi's chief consort, Nene, went to the Imperial Palace after her husband's death. Hideyoshi's son and successor was very young and could not rule in his place, giving Yodo-dono all the political prestige left by Hideyoshi. However, the situation would not be easily controlled, so Ishida Mitsunari under the influence of Hideyoshi's most loyal retainers and Hideyori's mother, Yodo-dono, went to war against Tokugawa Ieyasu.

In 1600, Toshimasa sided with Western army, supported Ishida Mitsunari during the Sekigahara Campaign and had evidently plotted to assassinate Tokugawa Ieyasu beforehand. Her brother Maeda Toshinaga (Matsu's first son) sided with Eastern army of Tokugawa Ieyasu after Hosokawa Tadaoki convinced him. Matsu's seventh daughter, Maeda Chiyo, was the wife of Hosokawa Tadataka (son of Hosokawa Tadaoki) of the Eastern Army, and Matsu's fourth daughter, Gō, who was adopted by Hideyoshi, was the wife of Ukita Hideie of the Western Army. Matsu's other daughters and relatives were part of one of the two armies

At the time of the Battle of Sekigahara, Toshinaga role was primarily to contain the forces of Uesugi Kagekatsu and Niwa Nagashige, and at the same time, to keep the forces of his younger brother, Maeda Toshimasa from joining the western army. Because of Toshimasa sided with Mitsunari, the Maeda family was accused of revolt against Tokugawa Ieyasu and being close to the Toyotomi clan, ran the risk of being annihilated by the Tokugawa clan. Matsu was voluntarily hostage to the capital of Edo, she did not bother to sacrifice herself to ensure the survival of the Maeda clan.

== Later life ==
Matsu spent 14 years as a prisoner at Edo Castle, the capital of the new shogun, Tokugawa Ieyasu, whom she hated as she watched him, her husband, and Hideyoshi vying for power. She struggled to maintain a friendly relationship with the members of the Tokugawa family, due to her determination, Ieyasu spared the Maeda clan from being annihilated and offered feuds and high social status to Matsu's children.

After the defeat and extinction of the Toyotomi clan in the Siege of Osaka in 1615, she was free to leave. Matsu eventually died in Kanazawa Castle becoming a figure of great respect for her heroic deed.

== Family ==
- Husband: Maeda Toshiie
- First Son: Maeda Toshinaga
- First Daughter: Kō (1559–1616) married Maeda Nagatane
- Second daughter: Sho married Nakagawa Mitsushige
- Third daughter: Maa (1572–1605) become Toyotomi Hideyoshi's concubine later married Madenokoji Atsufusa
- Fourth daughter: Gohime (1574–1634) married Ukita Hideie
- Fifth Daughter: Yome, Asano Yoshinaga's fiancée
- Second Son: Maeda Toshimasa (1578-1638)
- Sixth Daughter: Maeda Chiyo (1580–1641) married Hosokawa Tadataka later married Murai Nagatsugu

== Cultural references ==
Actress Matsushima Nanako acted as Maeda Matsu in NHK Taiga drama Toshiie to Matsu in 2002.

She is depicted as either playable or non-playable characters in the video games: Devil Kings, Sengoku Basara X, Sengoku Basara 2, Sengoku Basara 2: Heroes, Sengoku Basara 3: Utage (all in which she was armed with naginata and summons beasts), Samurai Warriors 2, Samurai Warriors 2: Xtreme Legends, Samurai Warriors 3: Empires, Kessen, and Kessen III.
