= Maeda Chiyo =

Daughter of Maeda Toshiie

Maeda Chiyo 前田千世
- Maeda clan emblem

Personal details
- Born: 1580
- Died: 1641 (aged 60–61)
- Spouse(s): Hosokawa Tadataka; Murai Nagatsugu
- Children: at least four daughters
- Parents: Maeda Toshiie (father); Maeda Matsu (mother)

Military service
- Allegiance: Hosokawa clan Maru clan
- Unit: Maeda clan

Maeda Chiyo (前田千世) or Shunkō-in (春香院, 1580–1641) was a Japanese noble woman from the Sengoku period. She was from the samurai-class Maeda clan, her father was Maeda Toshiie and her mother was Maeda Matsu. Chiyo was first married to Hosokawa Tadataka, and later to Murai Nagatsugu.

She was present during the incident that caused the death of her mother-in-law, Hosokawa Gracia, in the Sekigahara Campaign, abandoning her residence to take refuge in the Ukita residence of her sister, Gohime, who was part of Western army (Hosokawa's enemy army at the time); this event led to her expulsion from the Hosokawa clan along with Hosokawa Tadaoki's heir apparent, Tadataka.

== Life ==
In 1597, upon the direction of Toyotomi Hideyoshi, she married Hosokawa Tadataka, the eldest son and heir of Hosokawa Tadaoki, the first head of the Kokura domain in Buzen Province. Chiyo parents were close friends with Hideyoshi, so Maeda Toshiie was tasked with acting as one of the regents after Hideyoshi's death. Unfortunately, when Hideyoshi died, Toshiie also died some time later, so Japan, which had been unified under the Toyotomi clan, split into two factions, causing civil war again. The two factions were split between the Western army led by Ishida Mitsunari and the Eastern army led by Tokugawa Ieyasu, the struggle between these two army became known as the Sekigahara Campaign.

=== Battle of Sekigahara ===
The Western army was made up of Toyotomi clan loyalists, while the Eastern army was made up of Ieyasu's supporters. The Maeda clan was divided between both armies, Chiyo, her husband Tadakata and her brother Maeda Toshinaga were part of the Western army, while Maeda Toshimasa (1578) (Chiyo's brother) and Gohime (Chiyo's sister) who was Ukita Hideie's wife were part of the Western. Chiyo's Mother, Maeda Matsu, which was known at the time for supporting the stabilization of the Toyotomi and Maeda clan, voluntarily went to Edo (Capital of the Tokugawa clan) as a hostage in order for Ieyasu to spare the Maeda clan from any post-battle penalties.

Prior to the Battle of Sekigahara, Ishida Mitsunari planned to capture Chiyo's mother-in-law Hosokawa Gracia as a hostage. When the Hosokawa residence was surrounded by Mitsunari's soldiers, Gracia advised Chiyo to escape. Chiyo fled the residence in Ōsaka in a carriage to the Ukita residence where her older sister, Gōhime, lived. When the Western army approached Gracia's mansion, she asked her servant to kill her and set her residence on fire. Gracia's death caused much chaos, and damaged Ishida Mitsunari's reputation, which ultimately led to his defeat at the Battle of Sekigahara. Chiyo had fled from the Hosokawa mansion to the Enemy clan's residence, this act harmed the image of the Hosokawa family, whereupon she was expelled and returned to the Maeda family.

Her husband, Tadataka, defended Chiyo so he was also expelled from the Hosokawa family and attempted to rely upon the Maeda family but the Maeda family did not offer protection to the couple so they separated. Nevertheless, according to historical records, from 1605 to 1609, in Kyōto, Chiyo bore four daughters with Tadataka including Toku, Kichi, Fuku, and Man

=== Later life ===
In 1605, she remarried Murai Nagatsugu, a leader of the Eight Families of Kaga and elder of the Murai family of the Kaga domain with a fief of 17,000 koku.

After her marriage, she did not bear a child with Nagatsugu but adopted Nagamitsu (later called Nagaie, the fourth son of Oda Nagataka). In 1613, after the death of Nagatsugu, she underwent the rites of tonsure and adopted the name of Shunkōin. She then engaged in the rebuilding of the Kumakabuto Shrine in Noto Province.

In 1641, Shunkōin died in Kanazawa at the age of sixty-two. Her grave is on Mount Noda.

Maeda Chiyo was the last child of Maeda Matsu and was the most cherished among her children. Many letters remain that were written by Matsu to Chiyo kept at the Tamagawa Municipal Library in Kanazawa and the Museum of the Maeda Tosa-no-kami Family.
