= Kamo River =

Coordinates: 34°55′53″N 135°44′14″E

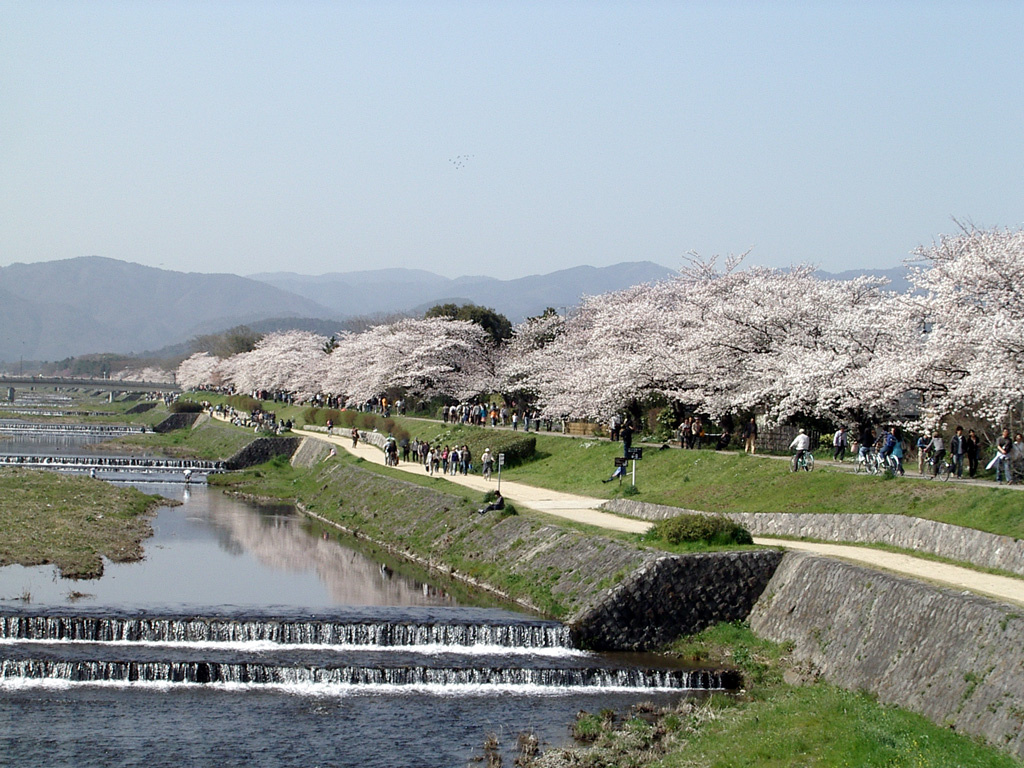
- Cherry blossoms along the Kamo River

- Native name: 鴨川 (Japanese)

Location
- Country: Japan

Physical characteristics
- Mouth
  - location: Yodo River
- Length: 31 km (19 mi)
- Basin size: 210 km^{2} (81 sq mi)

Basin features
- River system: Yodo River

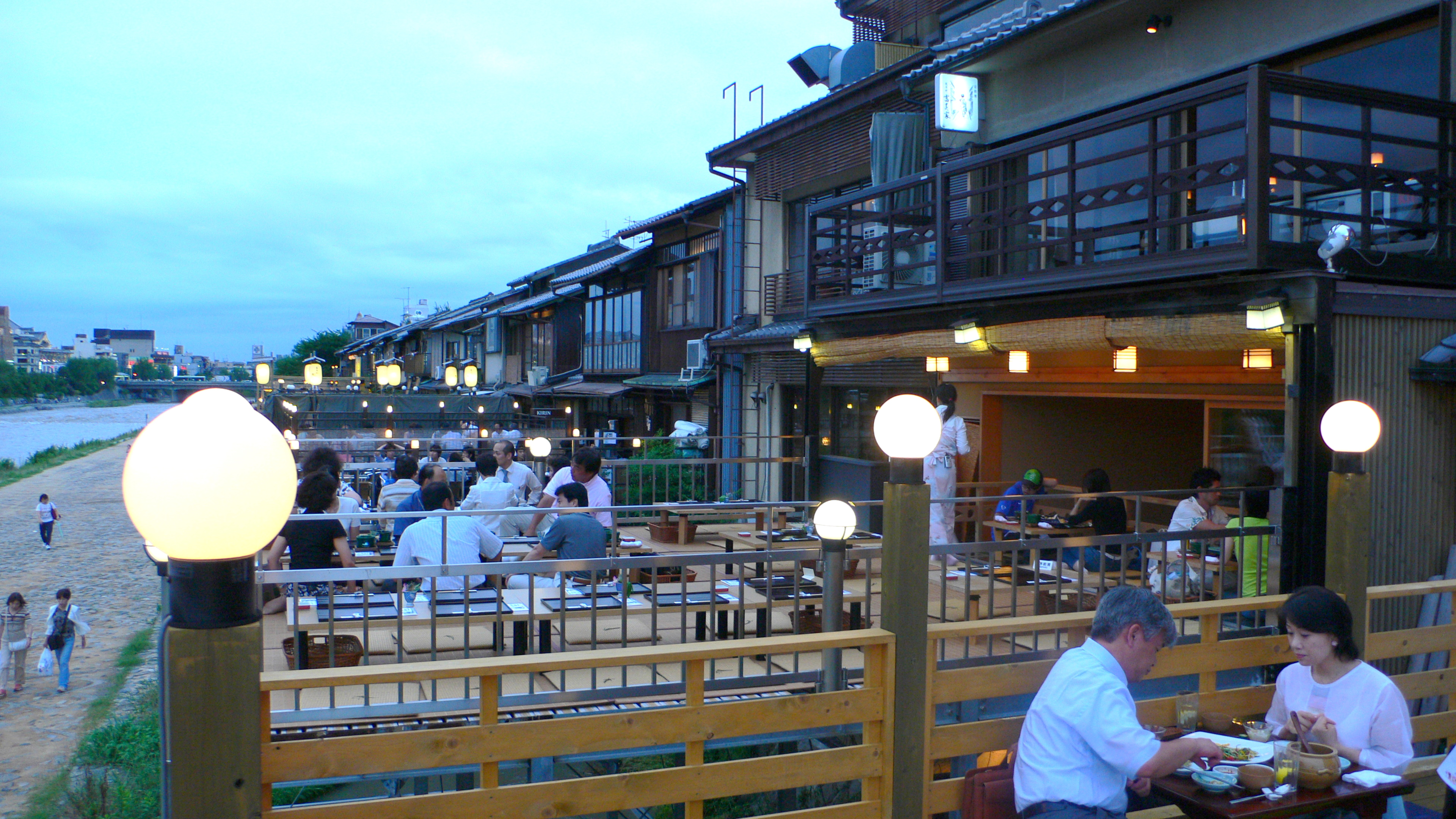
Restaurants overlooking the river

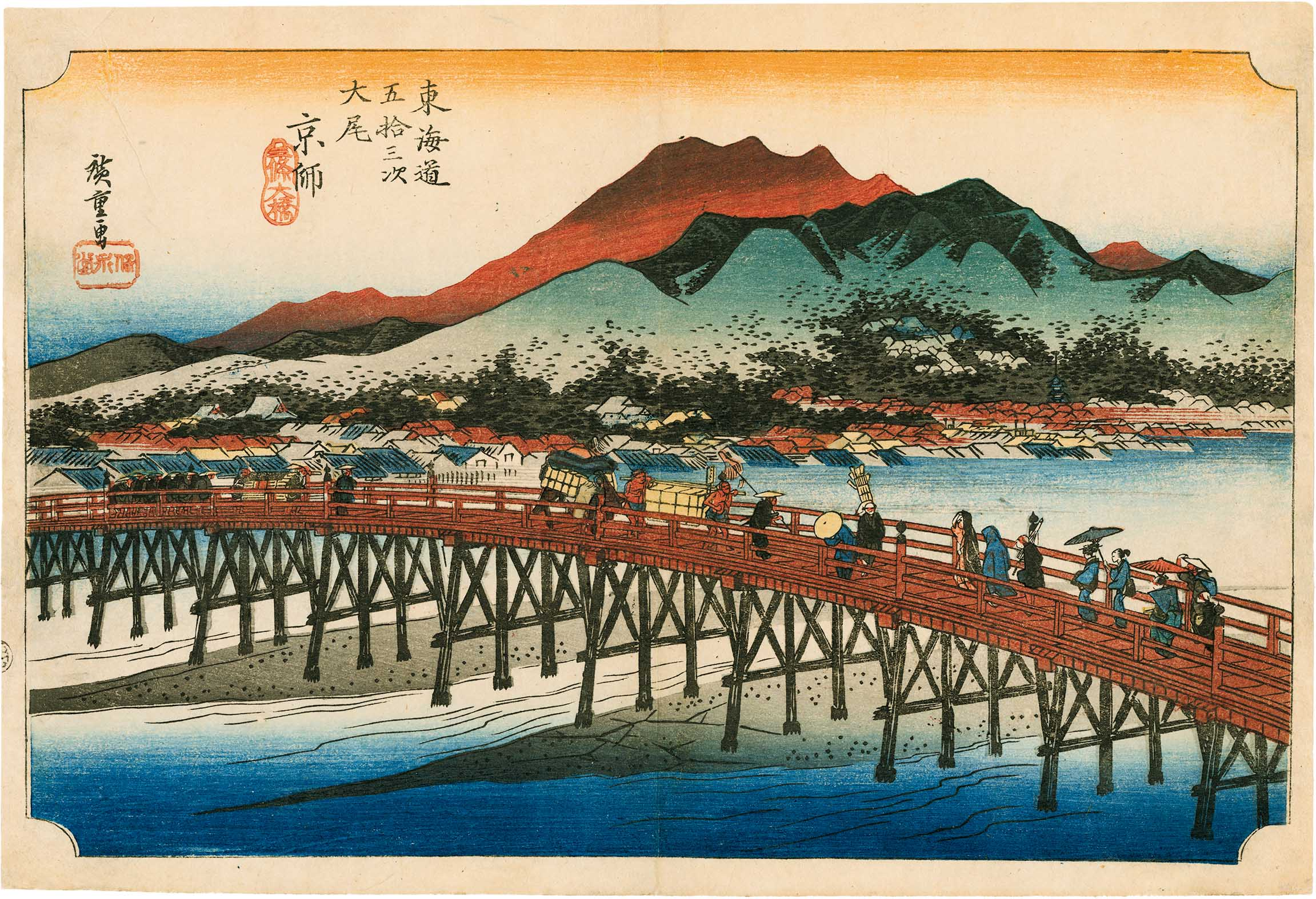
Hiroshige

The Kamo River (鴨川, Kamo-gawa; duck river – see onomastics) is located in Kyoto Prefecture, Japan. The riverbanks are popular walking spots for residents and tourists. In summer, restaurants open balconies looking out to the river. There are walkways running alongside the river, and some stepping stones that cross the river. The water level of the river is usually relatively low; less than one meter in most places. During the rainy season, however, the walkways sometimes flood in their lower stretches.

It is known for the two Kamo Shrines on its course: Kamigamo Shrine and Shimogamo Shrine and the shared Chinju no Mori between them Tadasu-no-mori.

== Geography ==
The Kamo River has its source in the mountains in the area of Mount Sajikigatake, around the boundary of Kumogahata village and Keihoku village in the northern ward of Kyoto. Flowing into the Kyoto Basin from the city area called Kamigamo in the same northern ward of the city, from there it bends south-east and, around the spot known as Demachi in the Kamigyō (or "Upper Kyoto" ward), joins with the Takano River which flows down from the northeastern direction, and there changes direction to due south through Kyoto's Nakagyō ("Central") ward. In the vicinity of the Shijō Bridge at Shijō Street in the center of downtown Kyoto, the Shirakawa River joins with it. At its southern part, the Horikawa River and West Takase River join with it, and at Shimomukōjima-cho in the Shimotoba part of Fushimi Ward of Kyoto City, it joins with the Katsura River, to become a tributary of the Yodo River.

There is a theory that in former times the main stream of the Kamo River was along the Horikawa river about 1 kilometre (0.6 miles) north of Misono Bridge, and when the Heian Capital (now Kyoto) was established, the river was diverted to its present route. According to historian Herbert E. Plutschow, "To allow a river to flow through and thereby divide a capital would have symbolized potential disunity of the nation. One of the first tasks, therefore, in laying out the new capital was to divert the rivers. The Kamo River once flowed through what is now Horikawa Street and met the Takano River south of their present confluence. Thus, large-scale works were required to prepare the land for the capital. The city was laid with its northernmost boundary at the present confluence of the Kamo and Takano rivers (just south of today's Imadegawa Street)."

The riverbanks where the Kamo River and Takano River join are known as the Tadasu River Banks (Jp., Tadasu-gawara 糺河原). At the triangular area of land here, there is the "River Confluence" shrine of Shimogamo Shrine, which leads into the forested area, Tadasu-no-mori.

== Onomastics ==
In Japanese the river is called Kamo-gawa, officially written using the kanji compound 鴨川. The first kanji means "wild duck" and is read kamo, and the second kanji means "river" and is read gawa. However, other kanji applied to this name are 賀茂川 or 加茂川. The first appearance in historical documents of the kanji 賀茂川 is in the Yamashiro no kuni fudoki (山城国風土記). In an entry dated the 19th day of the 6th month of 815 in the history Nihonkiryaku (日本記略), it is referred to as 鴨川. Now, the river north of where it joins with the Takano River is usually distinguished as the 加茂川 when written in kanji, and the river south of there is distinguished as the 鴨川.

The geographical area called Kamigamo, around the mouth of the valley leading into the Kyoto Basin, became the home grounds of the Kamo (賀茂) clan in ancient times. From this, there arose the regional name Otagi Region Kamo Block (愛宕郡賀茂郷), and consequently the geographical name Kamo (賀茂) set down roots. The river name took after this geographical name.

From the Deai Bridge until the Iwaya Bridge north of Kyoto city it is called Kumogahatagawa (雲が畑川) as it passes through the Kumogahata village. North of the Iwaya Bridge until its source the Kamo River is known as Ojitanigawa (祖父谷川).

A few scenes from Kamo River in 2022

== History ==
When the palace at the new Heian Capital (now Kyoto) was constructed at the end of the 8th century, the river's course was altered to flow east of the palace.

Floods often threatened the ancient capital. Emperor Shirakawa recited his three unmanageable things: Sōhei (armed monks of Enryaku-ji), dice, and the water of the Kamo River. These days, however, the riverbanks are reinforced with concrete and have improved drainage systems. The merchant Suminokura Ryōi constructed the Takase River on a parallel with the Kamo River in early 17th century. Transportation was done on the canal instead of the unstable mainstream.

The encounter between Minamoto no Yoshitsune and Benkei at Gojō Bridge (not the present one, but presumably Matsubara Bridge) over the river is a famous legend set in the late Heian period. Sanjō Bridge was regarded as the west end of the Tōkaidō during the Edo period.

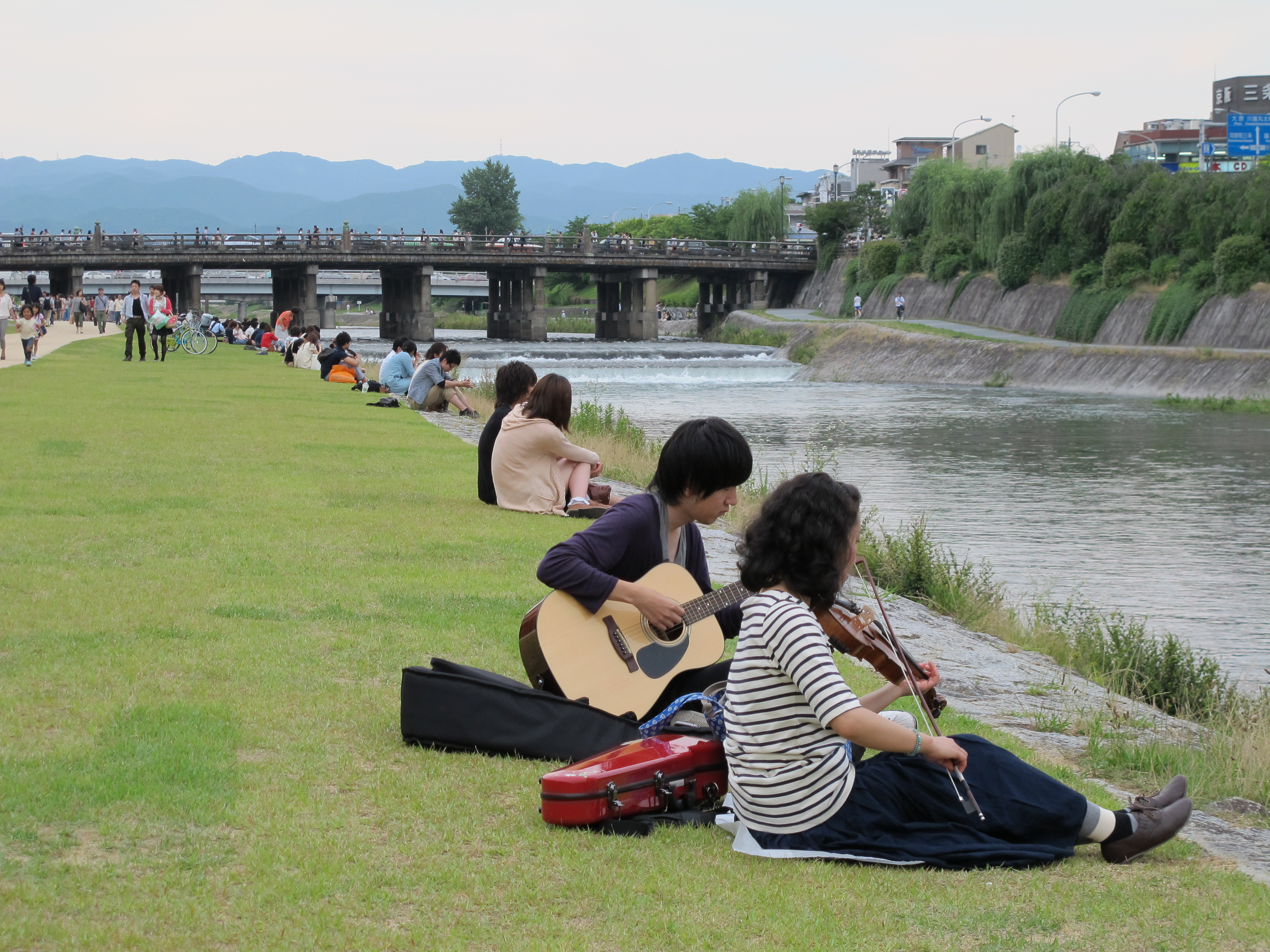
Couples sitting by the Kamo River in Summer

In the past, the river was a crucial source of relatively pure drinking water for Kyoto residents. It also played a role in Kyo-Yuzen dyeing, a famous craft of Kyoto.

The river is also the source of the stone that is a glaze ingredient used in traditional Japanese raku pottery.

The Kamo River is also the birthplace of Kabuki. In 1603 Izumo no Okuni formed a troupe of female dancers and began performing on a makeshift stage, on the dry bed of the river.
