= Kabukimono Keiji =

- Also known as: かぶき者慶次
- Genre: Jidaigeki
- Starring: Tatsuya Fuji; Shôhei Hino; Kyoko Enami; Noriko Aoyama; Mariya Nishiuchi; Masatō Ibu
- Theme music composer: Toshiyuki Watanabe
- Country of origin: Japan
- Original language: Japanese
- No. of episodes: 11

Production
- Running time: 45 minutes (per episode)
- Production company: NHK

Original release
- Network: NHK
- Release: April 9 – June 18, 2015

Kabukimono Keiji (かぶき者慶次) is a Japanese television jidaigeki or period drama that was broadcast in prime-time on NHK in 2015. Tatsuya Fuji played Maeda Keiji. Kabukimono Keiji depicts the later life of Maeda Keiji who was called Kabukimono.

== Plot ==
Maeda Keiji used to be a famous samurai but now he is spending half retired life at Mukuan(Keiji's fortified resistance) in Yonezawa.

Maeda Keiji secretly raised a child of Ishida Mitsunari as a child of himself but that was known to the Tokugawa shogunate. Tentoku was sent by Tokugawa shogunate as a spy to demolish Yonezawa han. Maeda Keiji tries to protect his child (Child of Ishida Mitsunari) and Yonezawa han from Tokugawa shogunate. When his wife is shot and injured by assassins of Tokugawa shogunate, Keiji decides to go to Sunpu castle to meet Tokugawa Ieyasu.

== Cast ==
- Tatsuya Fuji as Maeda Keiji
- Shōhei Hino as Matakichi
- Mariya Nishiuchi : Sano Maeda (Keiji's daughter)
- Aoi Nakamura as Shinkuro Maeda (Mitsunari Ishida's child)
- Kyoko Enami as Mitsu Maeda (Keiji's wife)
- Noriko Aoyama as Hana Maeda
- Tomoko Tabata as Take
- Bibari Maeda as Lady Izumino
- Asuka Kudō as Yasuda Katsunoshin
- Mitsu Dan as Shizuku
- Satoru Saito as Abe Ichizaemon
- Shun Oide as Araki Yasutsuna
- Nobuaki Kakuda as Kitagawa Jirozaemon
- Yuko Fueki as Yukiya
- Katsuhiko Watabiki as Tokugawa Ieyasu
- Masatō Ibu as Tentoku Oshō (A spy from Tokugawa shogunate)
