= Katō Tsune =

16th century Japanese samurai woman

Kaatō Tsune
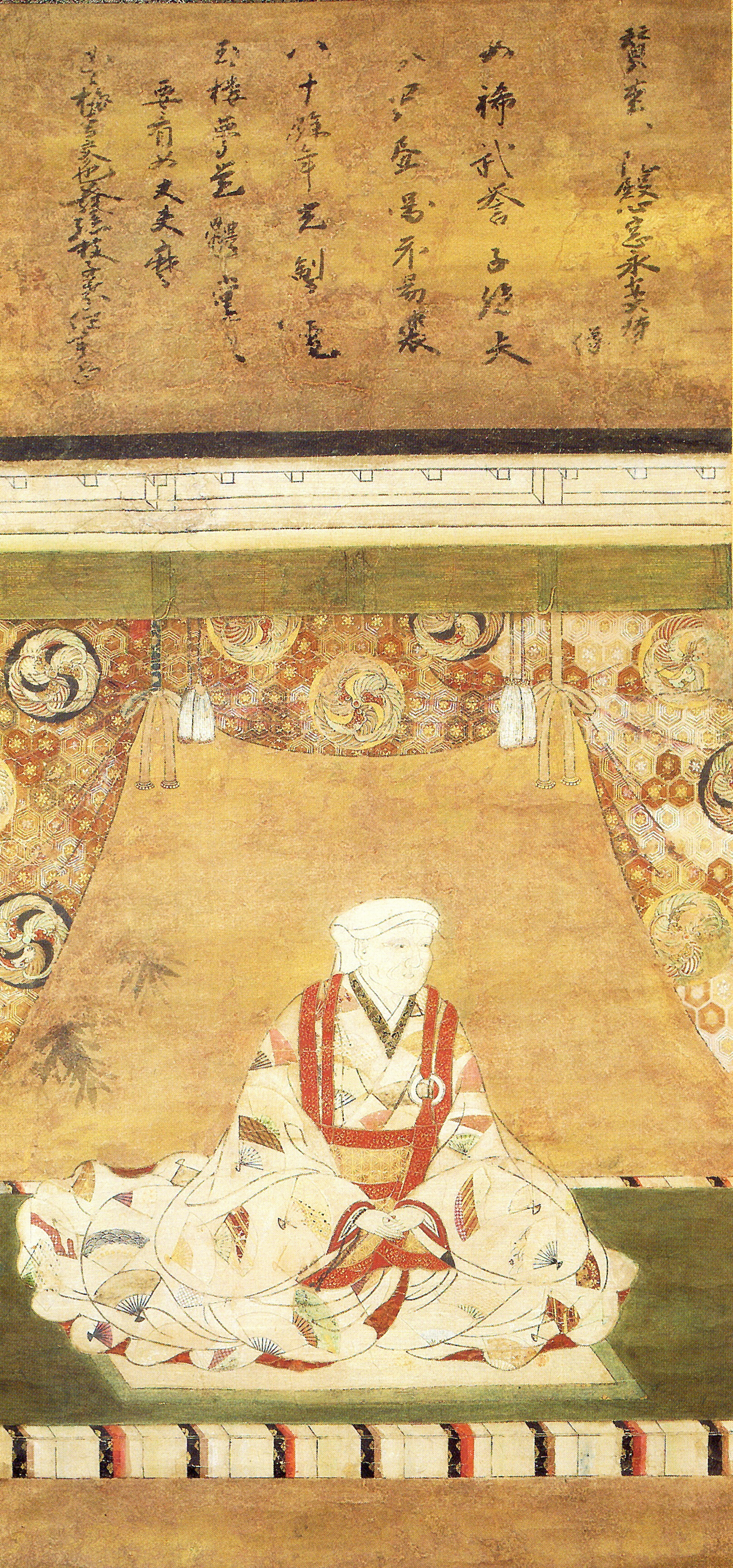
- Native name: 加藤つね
- Born: 16th century
- Died: Unknown date
- Allegiance: Katō clan Okumura clan Maeda clan
- Conflicts: Siege of Suemori
- Spouse: Okumura Nagatomi

Katō Tsune (加藤つね), Shōju-in (松寿院) or Otsune (お安) was a Japanese female warrior (Onna-musha) from the Sengoku period. She came from the Katō clan and was the wife of the samurai warlord Okumura Nagatomi. She helped her family and the Maeda troops resist Sassa Narimasa at the siege of Suemori Castle by providing food and medical aid to injured warriors and arming herself with a naginata to fight beside them during the conflict. In 1599, right before Maeda Toshiie's death, he gave Tsune two pieces of gold in appreciation for her bravery

== Siege of Suemori castle ==
Otsune patrols the inside of the castle with a naginata, cheers up the morale of castle soldiers, defend the castle walls from the attack of Narimasa troops consisting of 15,000 men and resisted until the arrival of the troops of Maeda Toshiie. Otsune's two eldest sons participated in the defense at a very young age. After the defenders' victory, Toshiie has become the most powerful daimyō in the Kaga (now Ishikawa Prefecture) region of Japan. Otsune was vital to the success of the castle's defense, Toshiie thanked her for her courageous act and received financial aid from the Maeda clan.

== Family ==
- Father: Katō Yosaburo
- Husband: Okumura Nagatomi (1541 - July 27, 1624)
- Children:
  - Okumura Yasuhide (1571 - January 30, 1644)
  - Okumura Haru (1568 - May 20, 1620)
  - Okumura Haruyuru

== See also ==
- Maeda Matsu
