= Maeda Toshimasu =

Japanese samurai of the Sengoku period

- 前田 利益
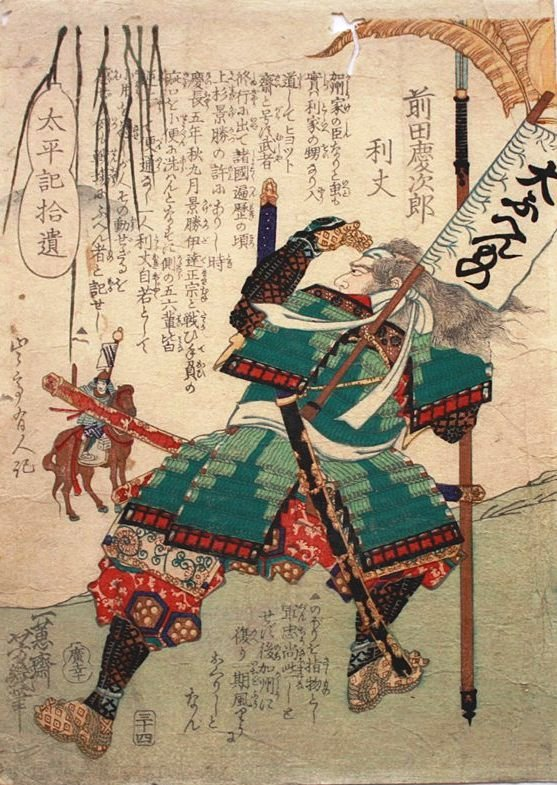
- An ukiyo-e print of Maeda Keijirō, by Utagawa Yoshiiku, 19th Century.
- Born: c. 1543
- Died: 1612
- Burial place: Dōmori Zenkō-ji, Yonezawa, Yamagata
- Other names: Maeda Keiji (前田慶次), Keijirō (慶次郎)
- Relatives: Takigawa Kazumasu (father)
- Military career
- Allegiance: Maeda clan Oda clan Toyotomi clan Uesugi clan Western Army
- Conflicts: Battle of Komaki and Nagakute (1584); Siege of Suemori (1584); Siege of Odawara (1590); Siege of Hasedō (1600)

Maeda Toshimasu (前田 利益; c. 1543 – 1612), better known as Maeda Keiji (前田 慶次) or Keijirō (慶次郎), was a Japanese samurai lord of the Sengoku period through early Edo period. He was the nephew of Maeda Toshiie and Maeda Matsu. In legends and fictions, he is one of the most celebrated kabukimono (samurai gangster) of the time period who is known for his monstrous height and his peerless strength. Toshimasu's horse and companion, Matsukaze, was one of the most famous warhorses in Japan.

== Biography ==
In 1543, Toshimasu was born in the village of Arako (present-day Nakagawa-ku, Nagoya), Toshimasu was born to the Takigawa Clan, originally the son of Takigawa Kazumasu. He was adopted by Maeda Toshihisa, the older brother of Maeda Toshiie. Toshimasu served under Oda Nobunaga along with his uncle. Toshimasu was originally intended to inherit Maeda family headship; however, after Oda Nobunaga replaced Toshihisa with Toshiie as Maeda family head, he lost this position. Perhaps because of this loss of inheritance, Toshimasu is well known for quarreling with his uncle.

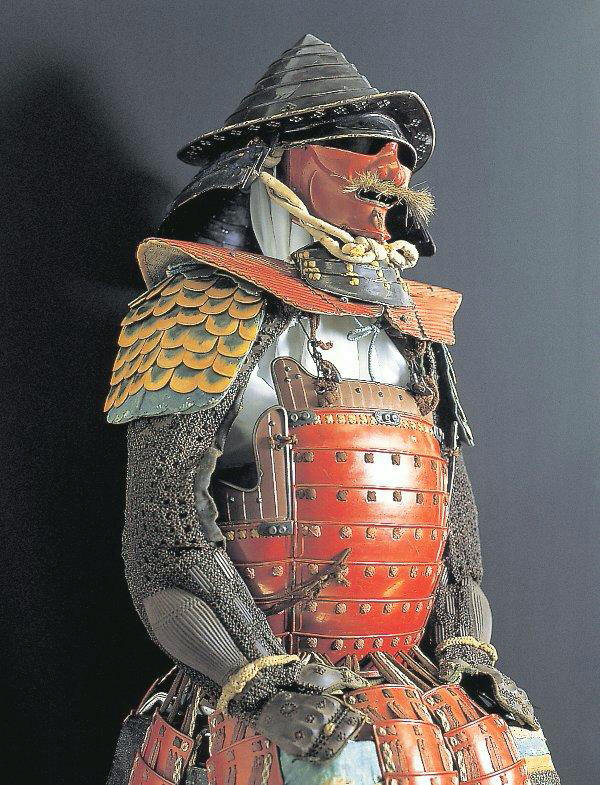
Toshimasu Maeda's armor

Keiji's armor can still be seen today at the Miyasaka Museum.

In 1581, Toshimasu was under the command of his uncle, and made a reputation for himself through conflicts within Noto Province and was rewarded with 5,000 koku.

In 1584, during the Battle of Komaki and Nagakute, Toshimasu came with Maeda Toshiie's to rescue Suemori Castle when was attacked by Sassa Narimasa.

When Maeda Toshihisa died in 1587, Toshimasu sent his son into the Maeda family's service. Keiji was barred from Toyotomi's Kyushu Campaign for his wild ways.

In 1590, he continued to help his uncle in the Odawara campaign. After Odawara campaign, Toshimasu returned to the capital and devoted himself to arts and literature. Either after Toshihisa's death or in 1590, relations between him and Toshiie grew sour. He fled from the Maeda family without taking his wife or child. After his escape, he resided in Kyoto. While in Kyoto, Toshimasu met and befriended Naoe Kanetsugu from the Uesugi clan. The two became close friends, and Toshimasu agreed to join Kanetsugu at Sekigahara Campaign, in the Uesugi clan's invasion of Aizu.

Later in 1600, at the Siege of Hasedō against Mogami clan and Date clan. He was led the center garrison of Uesugi forces, after Uesugi failed, Toshimasu was appointed to lead the rear guard during the retreat. Riding his horse "Matsukaze" into battle and brandishing a two-pronged spear, he made a splendid show of force. Due in part to Toshimasu's actions, the Uesugi forces were able to retreat largely intact. Legend says he broke through the enemy lines with only eight riders, and shattered their formation. After the Uesugi clan's move to the Yonezawa Domain, Toshimasu remained as a retainer and spent half retired life at Mukuan (Toshimasu's fortified residence).

== Matsukaze ==
Matsukaze ("wind in the pines") was Toshimasu's famous mount. According to the legend, he was bred of only the finest horses, but he refused to let anyone ride him and eventually ran away. Toshimasu managed to tame the wild horse, possibly due to Toshimasu's own wild personality. Since then, the two were never seen apart.

Matsukaze was said to be a horse of immense strength, able to carry his master's large frame for days. Supposedly, Matsukaze ran away after his master's death, never seen again.

== Depictions in fiction ==
Toshimasu is a playable character from the Western Army in the original Kessen and in Samurai Warriors and Warriors Orochi under the name Keiji.

He is also playable in the Sengoku Basara series, as Maeda Keiji.

He is a playable character in Pokémon Conquest (Pokémon + Nobunaga's Ambition in Japan), with his partner Pokémon being Bastiodon and Terrakion.

He is a unit in Battle Cats from the Sengoku Wargods banner. His first form is Maeda Keiji, his second form is Wargod Keiji, and his third form is Immortal Keiji.

In 2015, Tatsuya Fuji played the role of Toshimasu in the jidaigeki drama Kabukimono Keiji.

He is a character in the mobile otome game, Ikemen Sengoku
