= Yuki no Kata =

Japanese Samurai woman

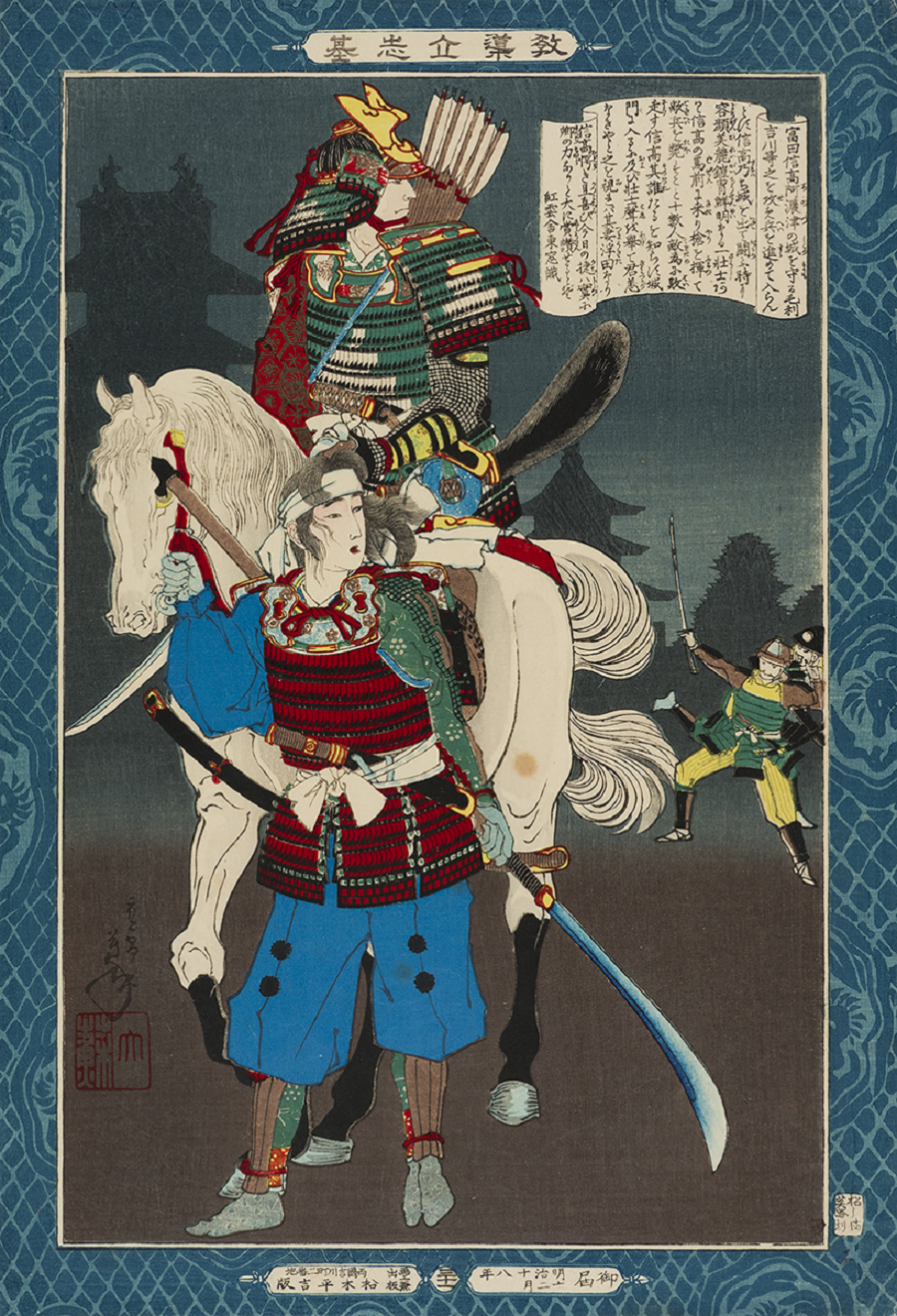
Yuki no kata and her husband defending Anōtsu castle.

Daughter of Ukita Yasunobu, was a Japanese female warrior (onna-musha) in the Sengoku period. She was the daughter of Ukita Hideie and Gōhime. She also married to Tomita Nobutaka, an officer of Toyotomi Hideyoshi. Her name, birth and death are not recorded. Portrayed in current records as beautiful and highly skilled warrior, there is also an anecdote that she defended Anotsu Castle during the Battle of Sekigahara.

== Battle of Anōtsu castle ==
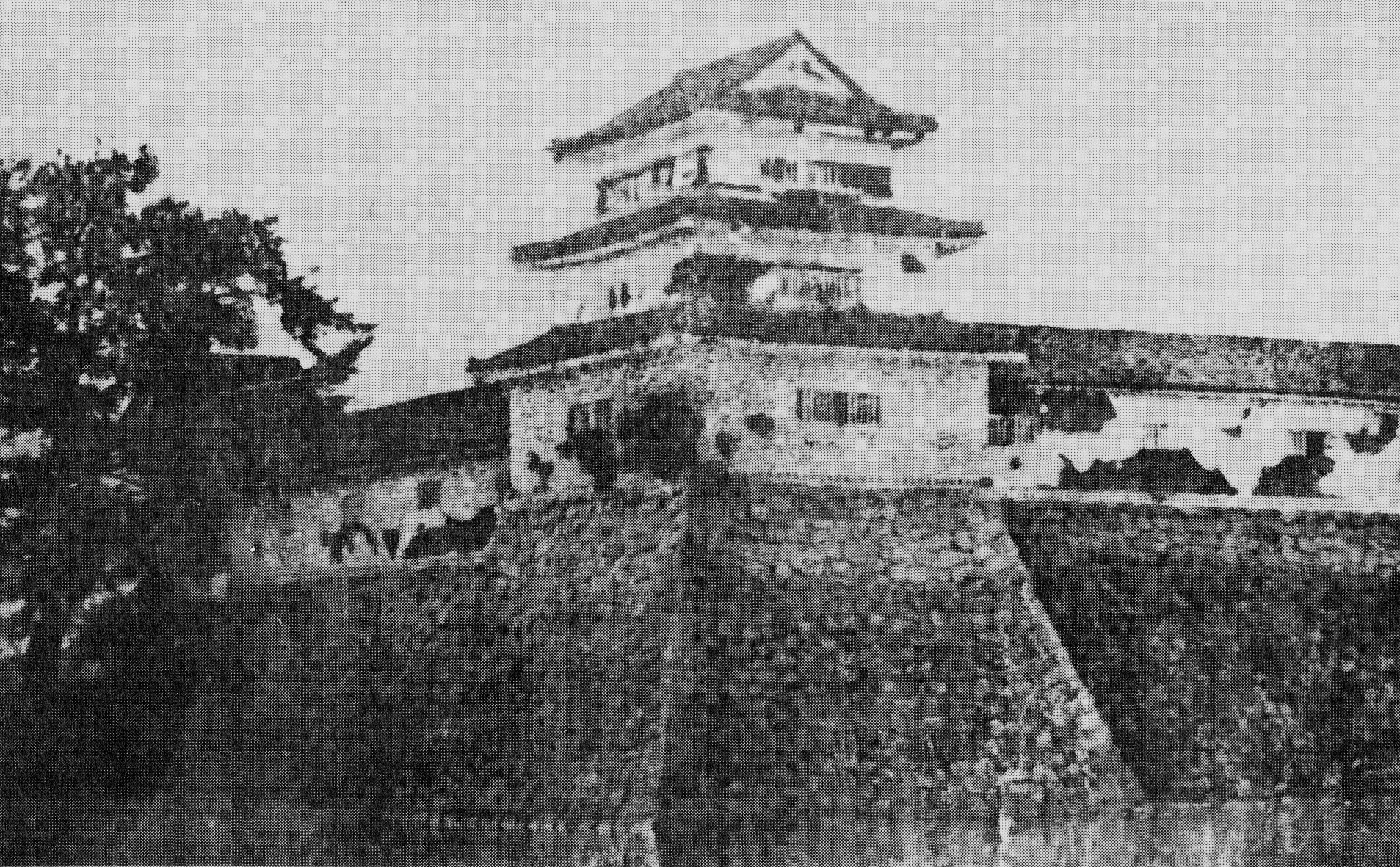
Anotsu castle tower.

Tomita Nobutaka and his wife sided with Tokugawa Ieyasu from the Eastern Army when Japan was prepared for the Sekigahara campaign. Nobutaka and his forces were summoned away to aid Ieyasu in punishing Uesugi Kagekatsu as Ishida Mitsunari prepared to attack the western roads towards Edo, Ieyasu's stronghold. The Anōtsu castle was right along the Western Army's path towards Ieyasu, so The Wife took the lead in defending the castle. Since her castle was supposed to be one of the first to be attacked during the campaign, The Wife armed herself, went to the castle walls, and summoned the remaining soldiers to the war.

Upon learning of Mitsunari's movements, Nobutaka rushed back to protect the Anōtsu castle but was delayed by Kuki Yoshitaka. He arrived in time before the western forces led by Mōri Terumoto, Chōsokabe Morichika, and Nabeshima Katsushige reached Anōtsu. Armed with only 1,700 troops, Yuki no Kata and their allies defended themselves against the western alliance force of 30,000; the battle officially began on October 1, 1600.

There is also the following anecdote about this battle. Although the 1300 defenders put up a stiff defense, the 30,000 attackers largely burned the castle down around them. In the heat of combat, Nobutaka was cut off from his allies in pursuit of an injured enemy officer. To save her husband, The wife drove some of the opposing soldiers away using a naginata. So great was her attack that the enemy mistook her for a formal samurai warrior. Having saved Nobutaka, their forces withdrew back into the castle for the night when negotiations began. Terumoto allowed the defenders to flee at night out of respect for their bravery against such overwhelming odds.

The Tomita clan were rewarded for their loyalty by the Tokugawa shogunate and were given an increase in revenue and rebuilt parts of the castle by the time they were transferred to Uwajima Domain in Iyo Province in 1608.

== Popular culture ==
- She features in Koei's Nobunaga's Ambition series of games as ''Ukita Asahi'' .She makes another appearance in Kessen III, also by Koei
- She appears as a minor supporting character in the 2025 video game Assassin's Creed Shadows.
