= Murai Nagayori =

Japanese samurai

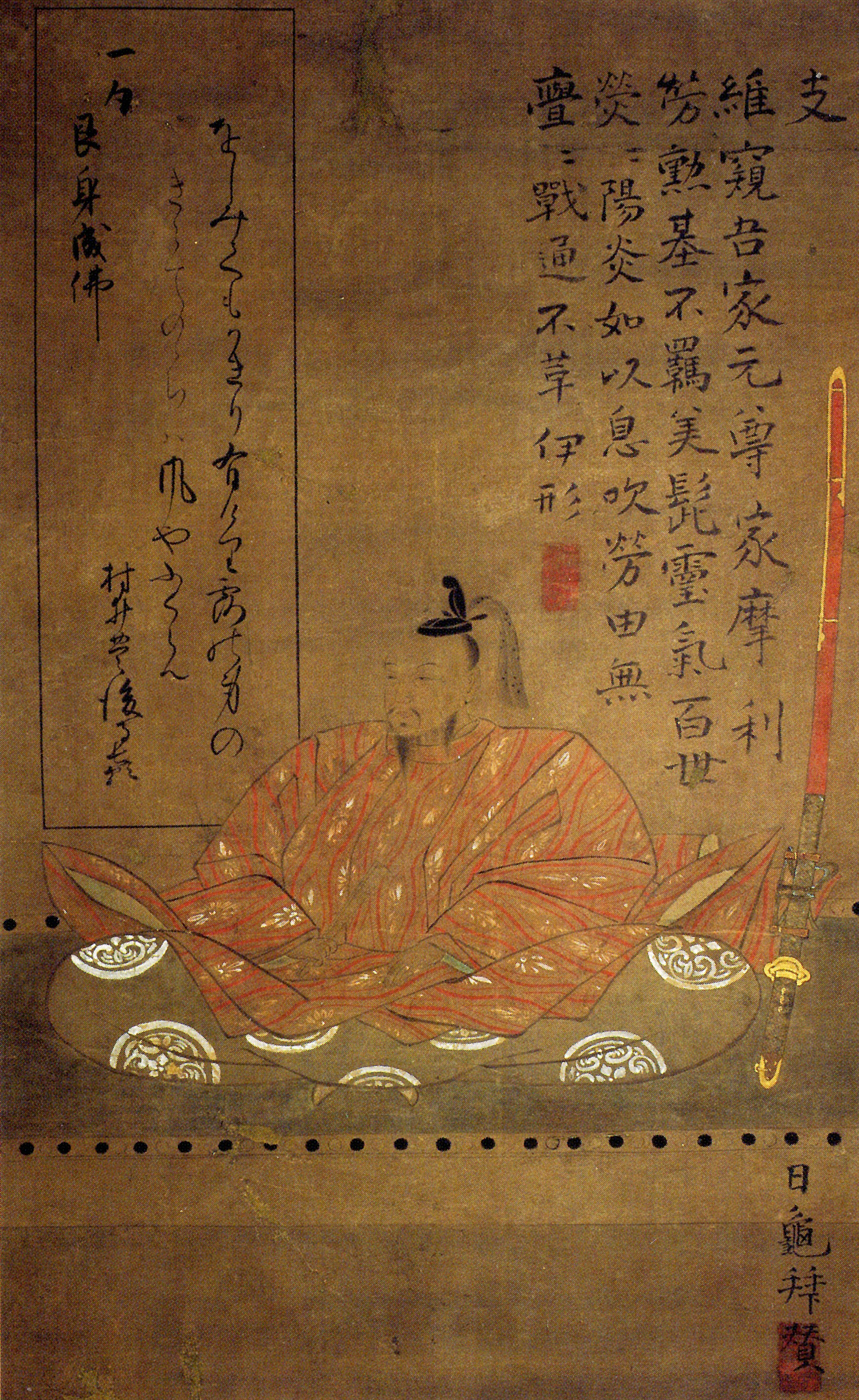
Portrait of Murai Nagayori from the Ishikawa Prefectural History Museum

Murai Nagayori (村井 長頼; 1543 – December 6, 1605) was a Japanese samurai of the Sengoku through Edo period. A retainer of Maeda Toshiie, he was the founder of one of the eight senior retainer families serving the Kaga han Maeda. Nagayori fought at the Battle of Nagashino.

After Oda Nobunaga's death during 1582, Nagayori served Shibata Katsuie and fought against Toyotomi Hideyoshi at Battle of Shizugatake. He was succeeded by his son Murai Nagatsugu.
