= Mount Sajikigatake =

Mountain in Kyoto Prefecture, Japan

- Mt. Sajiki
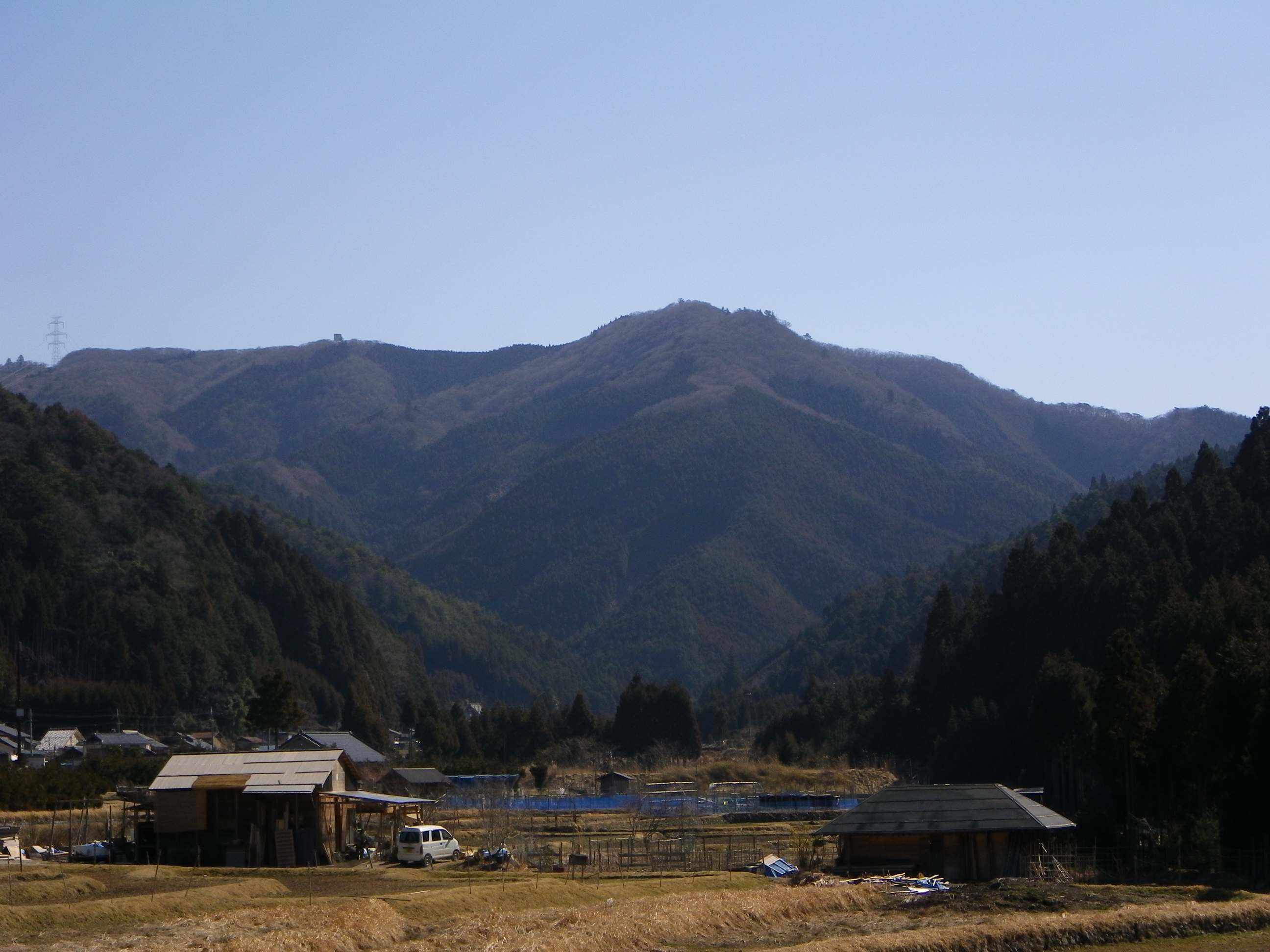

Highest point
- Elevation: 895.7 m (2,939 ft)
- Coordinates: 35°09′33″N 135°43′02″E

Naming
- Native name: 桟敷ヶ岳 (Japanese)

Geography
- Location: Kyoto Prefecture, Japan

Mount Sajikigatake (桟敷ヶ岳) is a mountain located in Kita-ku, part of Kyoto city, Kyoto Prefecture, Japan.

The Kamo River has its source in the area of the mountain.

It is popular amongst serious hikers; they can start in Kumogahata-cho (Kumogahata Town) and after the peak, they can continue to Onogo-cho (Onogo Town).
