= Izumo no Okuni =

Creator of kabuki theatre

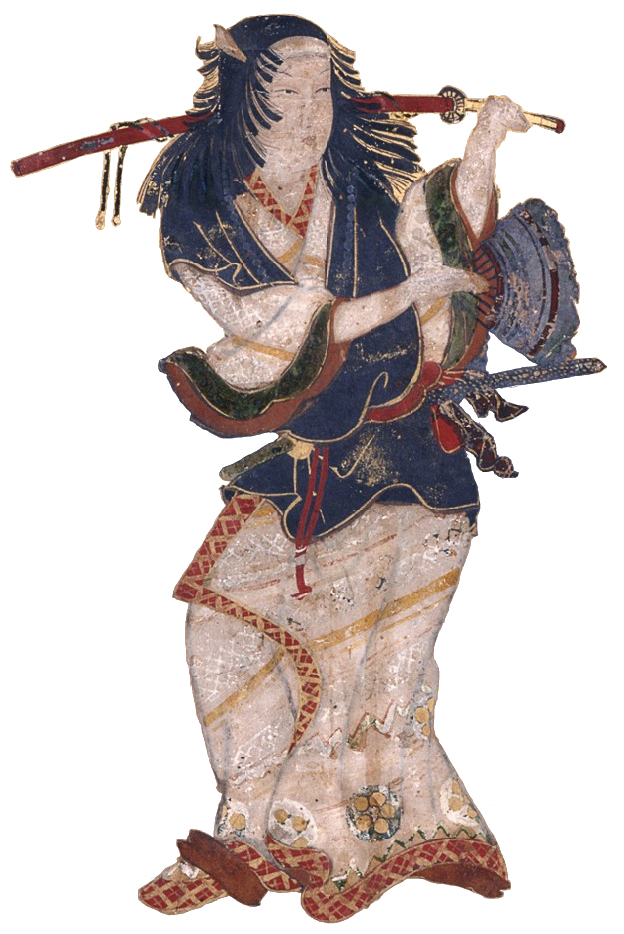
- Okuni in an early depiction
- Born: c. 1578; Izumo Province
- Occupation: Kabuki actress
- Known for: Invention of kabuki theatre

Izumo no Okuni (出雲 阿国) was a Japanese entertainer and miko (shrine maiden) who is believed to have invented the theatrical art form of kabuki. She is thought to have begun performing her new art style of kabuki (lit. 'by kanji spelling, the art of singing and dancing') theatre in the dry riverbed of the Kamo River in Kyoto. Okuni's troupe quickly gained immense popularity, and were known for their performers, who were often lower-class women Okuni had recruited to act in her all-female theatre group.

Few concrete details are known about her life; born near Izumo Province, Okuni worked as a miko for several years at the Izumo Grand Shrine until gaining popularity for her dramatised dance performances, which onlookers gave the name of kabuki. Okuni continued to perform kabuki with her theatrical troupe until her retirement and disappearance sometime around 1610. She is believed to have died sometime around 1613.

== History ==
=== Early years ===
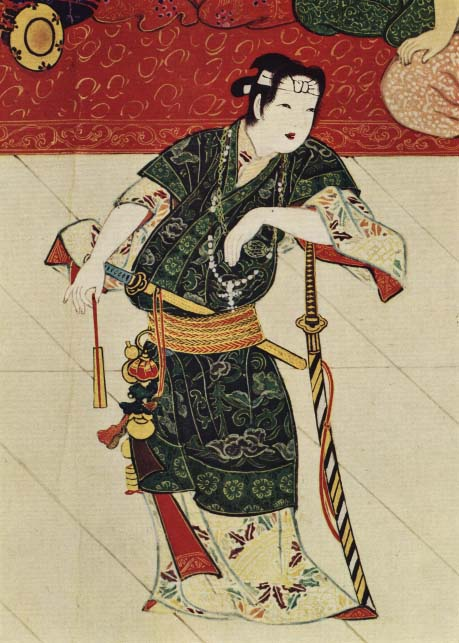
Okuni, dressed as a samurai

Born c. 1578, Okuni grew up in the vicinity of the Izumo shrine, where her father, Nakamura Sanemon, worked as a blacksmith, and where several other family members served. Eventually, Okuni joined as a miko (shrine maiden), where she was known for her skill in dancing and acting, as well as her beauty. As it was customary to send priests and others to solicit contributions for the shrine, she was sent to Kyoto to perform sacred dances and songs.

It was during her performances in Kyoto that she also became known for her performances of nembutsu odori (or nembutsu dance) in honour of Amitābha. Although this dance traces its origins to Kūya, a 10th-century evangelist of Pure Land Buddhism, by Okuni's time it had become a largely secular folk dance, and her particular adaptation was known for its sultriness and sexual innuendo. Other popular themes for Okuni's acts included humorous skits about lover's trysts at various public establishments and meetings between men and prostitutes. Between these and other dances and acts, she garnered much attention and began to draw large crowds wherever she performed. She was eventually summoned to return to the shrine, a call she ignored, though she continued to send money back.

=== Founding of kabuki ===
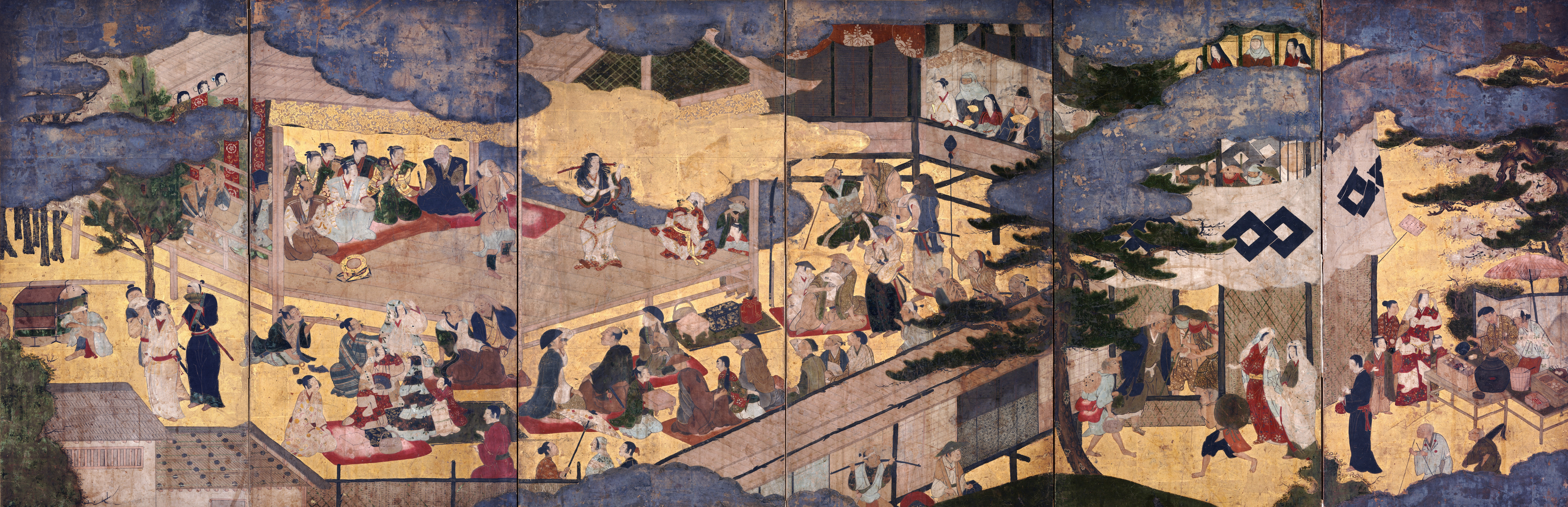
Okuni Kabuki-zu Byōbu, a six-panel canvas from the 17th century, is the oldest known painting featuring Izumo no Okuni (pictured onstage, third panel from left).

Around 1603, Okuni began performing on the dry riverbed of the Shijōgawara (Fourth Street Dry Riverbed) of the Kamo River and at Kitano Shrine. Okuni also performed for the ladies of the Imperial court. Gathering up the female outcasts and misfits of the region, particularly those involved in prostitution, Okuni gave them direction, teaching them acting, dancing and singing skills in order to form her troupe.

Several theories exist as to the etymology of the word kabuki, one being that it is derived from those who, oddly dressed and swaggering on the street, had been dubbed kabukimono (from kabuku, 'to lean in a certain direction', and mono, 'people'). Another possible origin is katamuki, which means 'slanted' or 'strongly-inclined.' In either case, others labelled Okuni's troupe performances "kabuki" due to their eccentricity and social daring. The earliest performances of kabuki were dancing and song with no significant plot, often disdained as overly sexual and cacophonous, but equally lauded as colourful and beautiful.

Okuni's troupe was exclusively female. Thus, she required her actresses to play both male and female roles. As her troupe gained fame, she was emulated by many others, particularly brothels, which offered such shows to amuse wealthy clients, as well as to gain prostitutes who had marketable acting and singing skills. This new style of exclusively female troupes became known by the alternative names of shibai and onnakabuki, (from onna, the Japanese word for 'woman' or 'girl') and Okuni kabuki.

=== Later years ===
One of Okuni's most popular performances featured the romantic character of Nagoya Sansaburō, a real-life samurai who had died in 1603. Onstage, Okuni's beautiful voice lured Sansaburō's spirit back into the world of the living to dance with her. Despite historical speculation about the possible links between Okuni and Sansaburō, it remains uncertain whether the pair had ever been lovers during his lifetime, or whether she had simply incorporated him into her storytelling.

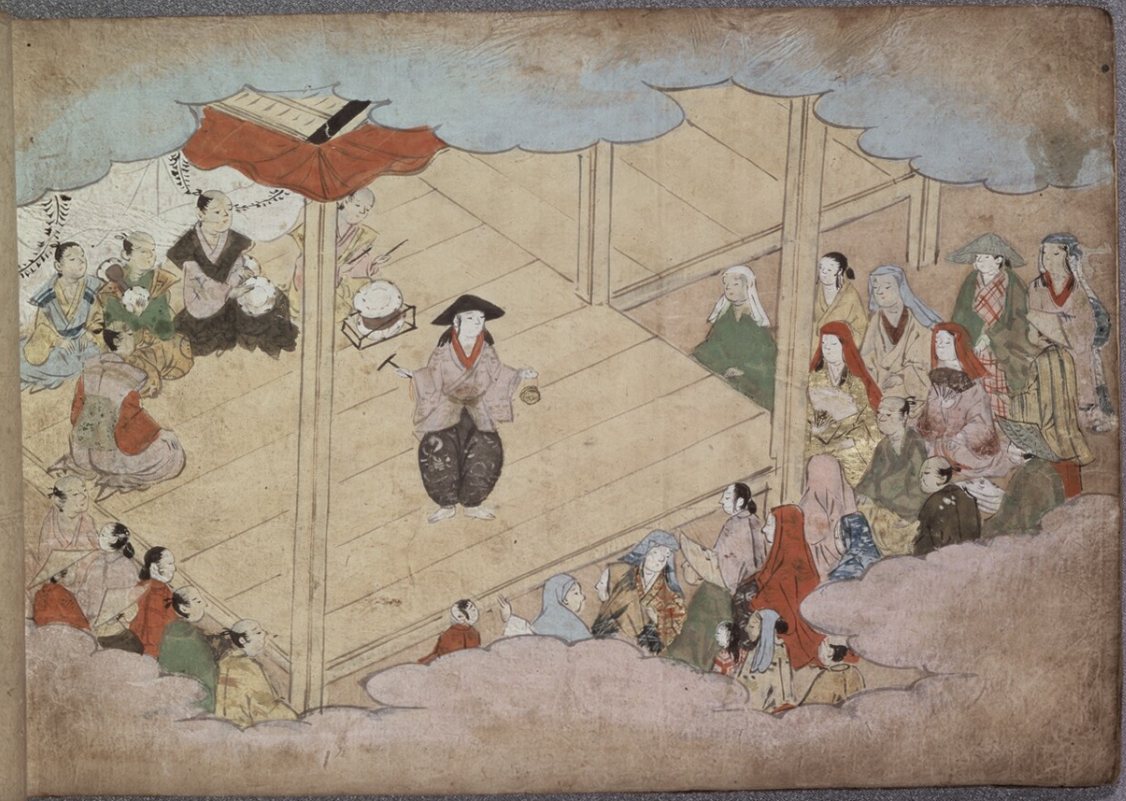
12th page of Kunijo Kabuki Ekotoba showing Izumo no Okuni, the founder of kabuki theatre, onstage.

Okuni retired around 1610 and disappeared. In 1629, due to outcry for moral reform and concern about fights breaking out between men trying to win the attention of the actresses, shōgun Tokugawa Iemitsu forbade women from performing in kabuki. They were quickly replaced by young men as actors and "actresses", though this was soon banned as well due to some of the same issues of sex work and 'corruption of morals', restricting the performances to those by older men, which is a standing practice in the official theatres even today.

There are several conflicting theories of Okuni's year of death; some say she died in 1610, others in 1613, or in 1640.

== Cultural impact and legacy ==
In addition to her founding of kabuki, Okuni contributed to Japanese theatre as a whole. She is said to have introduced the forerunner of the hanamichi ('path of flowers'), a runway leading from the rear of the theatre and crossing between the audience to the stage. This has been incorporated in several Japanese theatre arts beyond that of kabuki. In addition, she has also influenced modern musical theatre.

Ariyoshi Sawako published her novel Izumo no Okuni in the late 1960s, crafting a fictional biography of the dancer. The story was first printed as a serial in Fujin Kōron from 1967 to 1969.

A commemorative statue of Izumo no Okuni is located in Kyoto by the Kamo River, not far from the Minami-za kabuki theatre.

== Bibliography ==
- National Guitar Workshop (2008–2009). Guitar Atlas: Guitar Styles from Around the World. Alfred Publishing Co. ISBN 9780739063446.
- Hartley, Barbara (2018). "Izumo no Okuni Queers the Stage". In Miller, Laura; Copeland, Rebecca (eds.). Diva Nation: Female Icons from Japanese Cultural History. University of California Press. pp. 77–94. ISBN 978-0520969971.
- Průšek, Jaroslav; Słupski, Zbigniew (1974). Dictionary of Oriental Literatures: East Asia. Routledge. ISBN 9780415393539.
- Scott, A.C. (1955). The Kabuki Theatre of Japan. Oliver Wendell Holmes Library: Allen & Unwin. ISBN 9780486406459.
- Varley, Paul (2015). Japanese Culture, 4th Ed. University of Hawai'i Press. ISBN 978-0-8248-2152-4.
