= Demachi =

Demachi (written: 出町) is a surname. Notable people with the surname include:

- Giuseppe Demachi Italian composer
- Yoshiaki Demachi (出町 嘉明, born 1943), Japanese speed skater
- Yutaka Demachi (出町 豊, born 1935), Japanese Olympic athlete
