= Siege of Suemori =

1584 battle in Japan

Date	1584
Location	Suemori Castle, Owari Province
Result	Toyotomi victory

Belligerents
Tokugawa forces	Toyotomi forces

Commanders and leaders
Sassa Narimasa	Castle garrison: Okumura Nagatomi; Katō Tsune; Reinforcement: Maeda Toshiie; Maeda Toshimasu

Strength
15,000	

The siege of Suemori (末森の戦い, Suemori no Tatakai) was a battle during the Azuchi–Momoyama period (16th century) of Japan. At the time of the Battle of Komaki and Nagakute, Sassa Narimasa sided with Tokugawa Ieyasu, while his former companion, Maeda Toshiie stood with Toyotomi Hideyoshi.

Narimasa and Toshiie came to blows by battling at Suemori Castle. Narimasa had laid siege to the Suemori castle 9 October with 15,000 men. Okumura Nagatomi, along with his wife Katō Tsune, had defended the castle to their fullest extent, but soon their situation became very desperate. Maeda Toshiie arrived in the middle of the night, and defeated the forces of Sassa Narimasa.

After the defenders' victory, Maeda Toshiie has become the most powerful daimyō in the Kaga (now Ishikawa Prefecture) region of Japan.
