= Maeda Toshinaga =

Japanese daimyo (1562 – 1614)

- 前田 利長
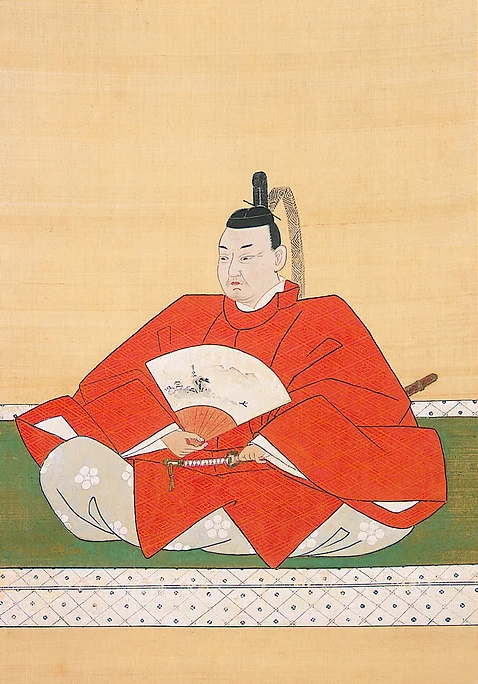

Lord of Kaga
- In office 1599–1605
- Preceded by: Maeda Toshiie
- Succeeded by: Maeda Toshitsune

Lord of Noto
- In office 1600–1605
- Preceded by: Maeda Toshimasa
- Succeeded by: Maeda Toshitsune

Personal details
- Born: Inuchiyo; February 15, 1562 Owari Province, Japan
- Died: June 27, 1614 (aged 52) Takaoka, Toyama, Japan
- Resting place: Takaoka, Toyama, Japan
- Spouse(s): Ei-hime, daughter of Oda Nobunaga
- Parents: Maeda Toshiie (father); Maeda Matsu (mother)

Military service
- Allegiance: Toyotomi clan Eastern Army; Tokugawa shogunate
- Unit: Maeda clan
- Battles/wars: Battle of Shizugatake (1583); Siege of Toyama (1585); Kyushu Campaign (1587); Siege of Odawara (1590); Battle of Asainawate (1600)

Maeda Toshinaga (前田 利長; February 15, 1562 – June 27, 1614) was a Sengoku period Japanese samurai and the second early-Edo period daimyō of Kaga Domain in the Hokuriku region of Japan, and the 3rd hereditary chieftain of the Maeda clan. He was the eldest son of Maeda Toshiie. His childhood name was "Inuchiyo" (犬千代).

== Biography ==
Toshinaga was born in what is now part of the city of Nagoya in Owari Province, where his father was in the service of Oda Nobunaga In 1581, he married one of Oda Nobunaga's daughters, Ei-hime, who was only six years old at the time. Nobunaga was assassinated the following year at the Honnō-ji Incident.

In 1583, he assisted his father at the Battle of Shizugatake and after the death of Shibata Katsuie, he swore fealty to Toyotomi Hideyoshi and was awarded a 40,000 koku fief in Kaga Province.

In 1585, he played a key role in Hideyoshi's campaign against Sassa Narimasa, and his holdings were greatly expanded to 320,000 koku across Kaga and Etchū Provinces. He led some 3,000 men in Toyotomi Hideyoshi's during the Kyūshū Campaign (1587) and the Siege of Odawara (1590).

In 1598, he received the 267,000 koku Kanazawa holdings of his father, Maeda Toshiie. Toshiie died the following year 1599, and Hosokawa Tadaoki convinced Toshinaga to support Tokugawa Ieyasu over Ishida Mitsunari and Toyotomi Hideyori.

In 1600, at the time of the Battle of Sekigahara, his role was primarily to contain the forces of Uesugi Kagekatsu and Niwa Nagashige, they clash at Battle of Asainawate, and at the same time, to keep the forces of his younger brother, Maeda Toshimasa, ruler of Noto Province, from joining the western army.

On the establishment of the Tokugawa shogunate, Toshinaga was confirmed in his holdings, which had also been expanded by the addition of 225,000 koku formerly held by his brother Toshimasa, and 120,000 koku from Komatsu Castle and 63,000 koku from Daisho-ji Castle to a total of 1,025,000 koku, which covered the provinces of Kaga, Noto and Etchū. The kokudaka of Kaga Domain was exceeded only by the Shogunal house itself. Toshinaga built and resided in Kanazawa Castle.

With the establishment of the sankin-kōtai system of alternative attendance in Edo, Toshinaga was the first daimyō to establish a residence in the new capital.

Toshinaga had no son and adopted his younger brother Maeda Toshitsune as his heir. He retired in 1605, and relocated from Kanazawa to Toyama Castle, setting aside 220,000 koku for his retirement expenses.

== Death ==
When Toyama Castle burned down in 1609, he moved to Uozu, and later to Takaoka. During this period, he increasingly withdrew from public life due to complications from syphilis, and committed suicide by poison at Takaoka Castle in 1614. His mortuary temple is the temple of Zuiryū-ji in Takaoka.

== Family ==
- Father: Maeda Toshiie
- Mother: Maeda Matsu
- Wife: Ei-hime (1574–1623)
- Concubine: Otsubo Sukezaemon's daughter
  - Daughter: Manhime (1605–1611)
- Adopted son: Maeda Toshitsune
- Adopted daughters:
  - Sensho-in
  - Ona, later Soshin'ni (1588–1675), Makimura Toshisada's daughter
  - Eiju-in, married Aoyama Yoshitsugu, Kyubei Teranishi's daughter
  - Takeshima-dono, later Hisaka-in, Maeda Naotomo's wife, Chō Tsuratatsu's daughter

Preceded by Maeda Toshiie	1st (Maeda) daimyō of Kaga; 1599–1605	Succeeded by Maeda Toshitsune
