= Maeda Toshiie =

General of Oda Nobunaga following the Sengoku period

- 前田 利家
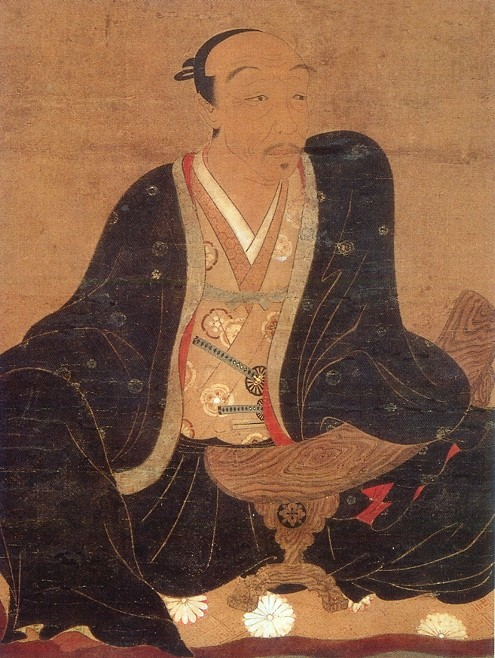

Head of Maeda clan
- In office 1560–1599
- Preceded by: Maeda Toshimasa
- Succeeded by: Maeda Toshinaga

Lord of Kaga domain
- In office 1580–1599
- Succeeded by: Maeda Toshinaga

Lord of Kanazawa Castle
- In office 1583–1599
- Preceded by: Sakuma Morimasa
- Succeeded by: Maeda Toshinaga

Personal details
- Born: Inuchiyo (犬千代); January 15, 1538 Arako, Owari Province
- Died: April 27, 1599 (aged 61) Kanazawa, Kaga Province
- Spouse: Maeda Matsu
- Children: Maeda Toshinaga; Gōhime; Maeda Toshimasa; Maeda Chiyo; Maeda Toshitsune; Maeda Toshitaka
- Parents: Maeda Toshimasa (father); Nagayowai-in (長齢院) (mother)
- Nickname(s): "Inu" (dog) "Yari-no-Mataza" "Matazaemon"

Military service
- Allegiance: Oda clan Toyotomi clan
- Rank: Daimyo, Dainagon
- Unit: Maeda clan
- Commands: Kanazawa Castle
- Battles/wars: Battle of Kiyosu; Battle of Ino; Battle of Ukino; Battle of Okehazama; Battle of Moribe; Siege of Inabayama; Siege of Kanegasaki; Battle of Anegawa; Echizen Campaign; Battle of Nagashino; Kaga Campaign; Battle of Tedorigawa; Battle of Shizugatake; Siege of Suemori; Siege of Hachigata; Siege of Hachiōji; Siege of Odawara; Kunohe rebellion

Maeda Toshiie (前田 利家; January 15, 1538 – April 27, 1599) was one of the leading generals of Oda Nobunaga following the Sengoku period of the 16th century extending to the Azuchi–Momoyama period. His preferred weapon was a yari, and Matazaemon (又左衛門) was his common name; he was therefore known as Yari no Mataza (槍の又左). He was a member of the so-called Echizen Sanninshu (Echizen Triumvir) along with Sassa Narimasa and Fuwa Mitsuharu. The highest rank from the court that he received is the Great Counselor Dainagon (大納言).

== Early life ==
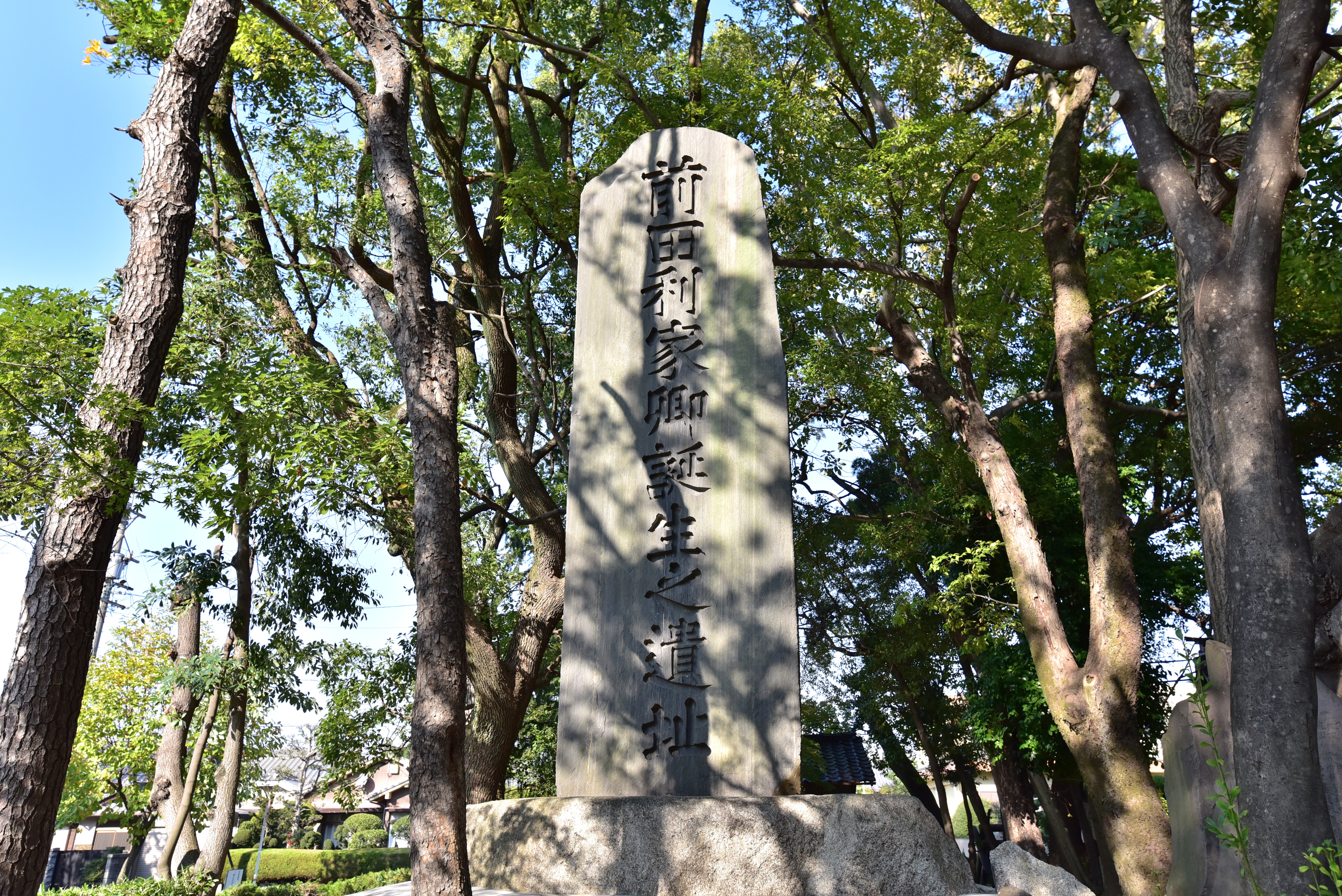
Maeda Toshiie's birthplace monument(Nakagawa-ku, Nagoya)

His father was Maeda Toshimasa and his wife was Maeda Matsu. His childhood name was "Inuchiyo" (犬千代). Toshiie was born in the village of Arako (present-day Nakagawa-ku, Nagoya). He was the fourth of seven brothers, of Maeda Toshimasa, who held Arako Castle. Toshiie served Oda Nobunaga from childhood (first as a page) and his loyalty was rewarded by being allowed to be the head of the Maeda clan, very unusual for a fourth son with no apparent failures among his elder brothers. Just like Nobunaga, Toshiie was also a delinquent; usually dressed in the outlandish style of a kabukimono, they committed delinquent and deviated behaviors together. It is believed he also became a friend to Kinoshita Tokichiro (later Toyotomi Hideyoshi) in their youth. Just as Hideyoshi was known as Saru, 猴 or "monkey," it is believed that Toshiie was called Inu, 犬 or "dog" by Nobunaga. Due to a long-standing belief that dogs and monkeys are never friendly to each other, Toshiie is often depicted as reserved and stern, in contrast to Hideyoshi's talkative and easy-going nature.

== Military life ==
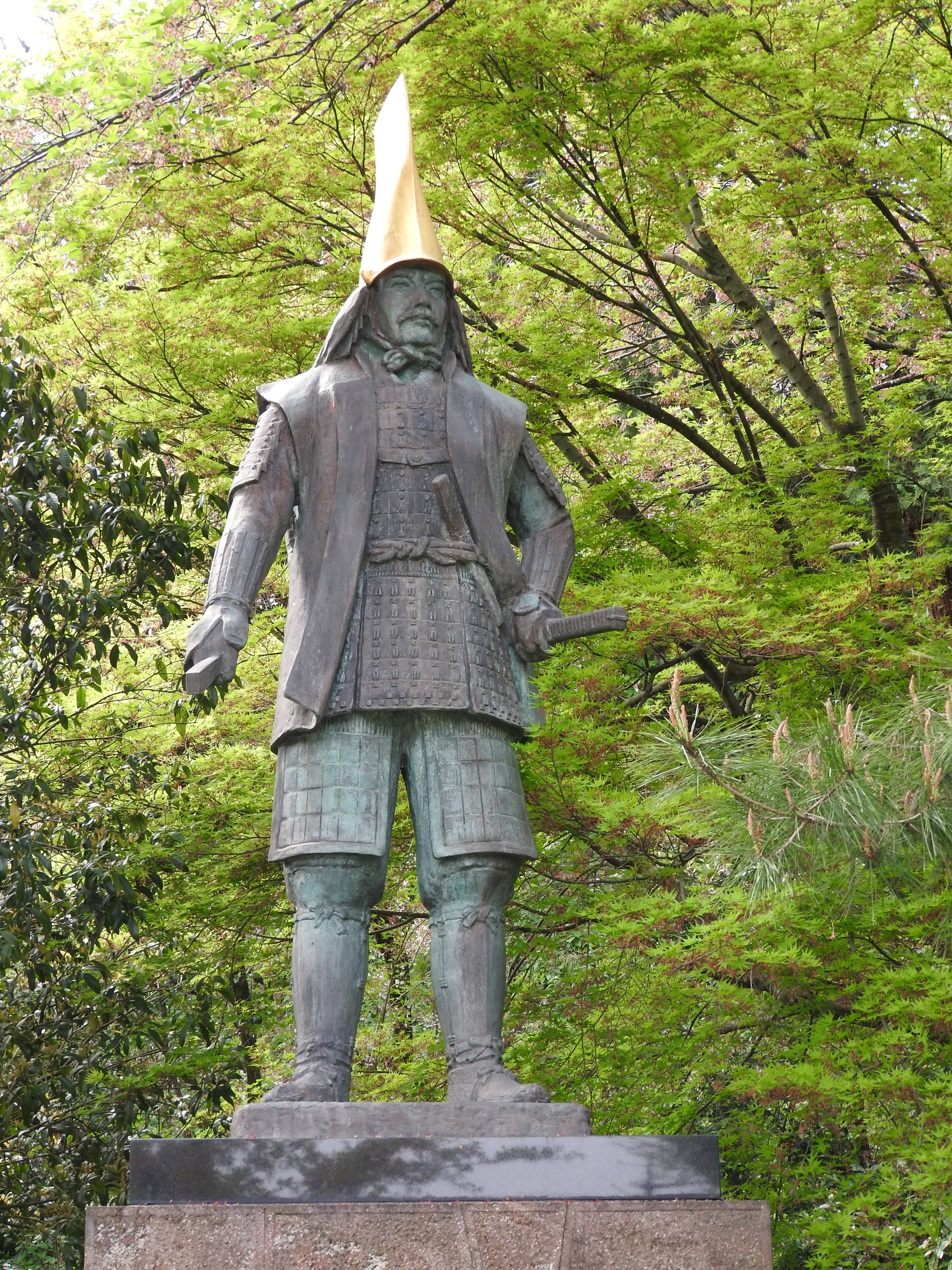
Statue of Maeda Toshiie

Toshiie began his career as a member of the akahoro-shū (赤母衣衆), the unit under Oda Nobunaga's personal command. He later became an infantry captain (ashigaru taishō 足軽大将) in the Oda army. Later, he become the leader of Oda's Akahoro-shū (赤母衣衆, lit. 'Red Mantle group'), a military group that wore a red Horo (cloak) on their backs.

During his military career, Toshiie made the acquaintance of many important figures, such as Hashiba Hideyoshi, Sassa Narimasa, Niwa Nagahide, Ikeda Tsuneoki, and others. Toshiie also was a lifelong rival of Tokugawa Ieyasu. After defeating the Asakura clan, Maeda fought under Shibata Katsuie in the Hokuriku area.

In 1552 - 1554, he took part in the war for the first time in the Battle of Kiyosu Castle which broke out between Nobunaga and Oda Nobutomo, of the Kiyosu Oda clan.

In 1556, he fought in the Battle of Ino against Oda Nobuyuki, younger brother of Nobunaga.

In 1558, he also took part in the Battle of Ukino which was a conflict with Oda Nobukata, a son of Oda Nobuyasu, of the Iwakura Oda clan. It is said that it was about the time of this battle that he began to be called by another name like "Yari no Matazaemon" or "Yari no Mataza".

In 1559, he killed Nobunaga’s dōbōshū (同朋衆) Jūami (十阿弥) from a quarrel that regarded the theft of his hairpin, made him dismissal by Nobunaga as a Ronin, and protected by Matsuoka (松岡) clan from Atsuta Shrine.

In 1560, he secretly followed Mori Yoshinari took part in the Battle of Okehazama, and killed 3 Imagawa’s soldiers, but still not pardoned by Nobunaga.

In 1561, he also secretly took part in the Battle of Moribe, he killed a Saitō’s soldiers and a general named Adachi Rokubei (足立六兵衛) who renowned for superhuman strength, this time he pardoned by Nobunaga and back to the position.

His father Toshimasa was died when he was a Ronin, and Maeda clan was succeeded by his elder brother Toshihisa (利久). But in 1569, Oda Nobunaga used Toshihisa frail health as a pretext and ordered him abdicate the power, Toshiie succeeded the head under Nobunaga’s order.

Later he fought in the 1570 Siege of Kanegasaki and Battle of Anegawa, the 1575 Battle of Nagashino, and the 1577 Battle of Tedorigawa.

In 1580, he was granted the fief of Fuchu, and a han (Kaga Domain) spanning the Noto and Kaga Provinces. Despite its small size, Kaga was a highly productive province which would eventually develop into the wealthiest han in Edo period Japan, with a net worth of 1 million koku (百万石); thus, it was nicknamed Kaga Hyaku-man-goku (加賀百万石). Toshiie benefited from a core group of very capable senior vassals. Some, like Murai Nagayori and Okumura Nagatomi, were retainers of long standing with the Maeda.

In 1582, after Nobunaga's assassination at Honnō-ji (本能寺) by Akechi Mitsuhide and Mitsuhide's defeat by Hideyoshi, at the subsequent meeting in Kiyosu Castle where the future of the Oda clan was discussed, Toshiie supported Shibata Katsuie's claim.

In 1583, he battled Hideyoshi under Katsuie's command in the Battle of Shizugatake, but later during the battle, he switched sides to Hideyoshi.

In 1584, after Shibata's defeat, Toshiie become leading general for Hideyoshi in Komaki Nagakute Campaign and was forced to fight another of his friends, Sassa Narimasa at the Battle of Suemori Castle. Narimasa was greatly outnumbered and felled by Toshiie.

In 1587, following the major Maeda victory, Toshiie sheltered his fellow daimyo Dom Justo Takayama after Justo was expelled from his position as representative of Christians by the shogun's Bantenren order.

Later in 1590, Toshiie fought in the Odawara Campaign against Later Hōjō clan. Toshiie and Uesugi Kagekatsu led a detached force of 35,000 soldiers through Usui Pass. This army captured the Hōjō strongholds one-by-one: Matsuida Castle, Minowa Castle, Maebashi Castle, Matsuyama Castle and Hachigata Castle before finally taking Hachiōji Castle.

In 1591, he helped suppress the Kunohe rebellion in many locations along with Tokugawa Ieyasu and many generals from northern Japan.

== Later years ==
In 1598, upon Toyotomi Hideyoshi's death, Tokugawa Ieyasu proceeded with the "expansion of power through marriage alliances," which Hideyoshi had explicitly forbidden. Ishida Mitsunari and other magistrates relied on Toshiie, and tensions between the Tokugawa and Maeda clans reached a critical point. Many influential daimyo, including Mōri Terumoto, Uesugi Kagekatsu, Ukita Hideie, Katō Kiyomasa, and Hosokawa Tadaoki, supported Toshiie. As a result, Ieyasu apologized to Toshiie, and for the time being, the situation was defused.

== Death ==
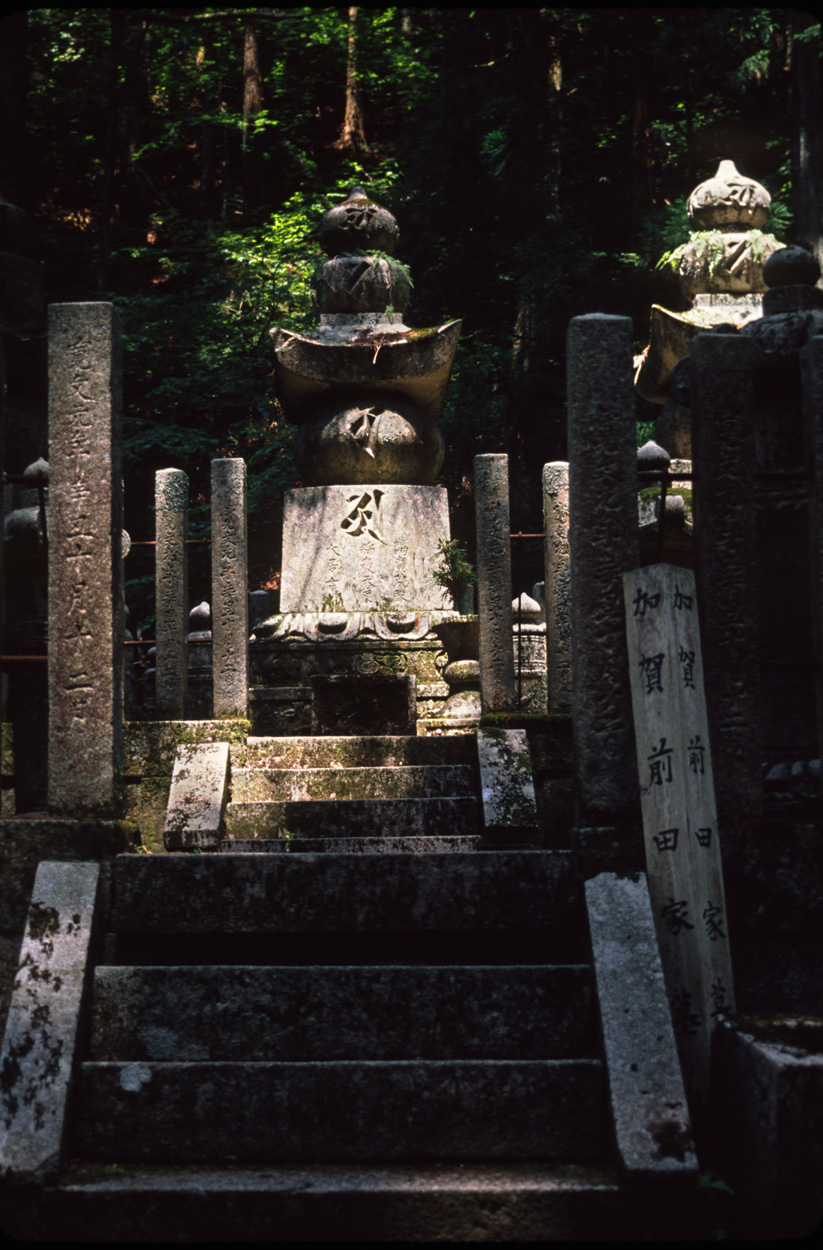
Grave of Maeda clan at Mount Kōya

Before dying in 1598, Hideyoshi named Toshiie to the council of Five Elders to support Toyotomi Hideyori until he was old enough to take control on his own. However, Toshiie himself was ailing, and could manage to support Hideyori for only a year before he died as well in 1599.

== After death ==
Toshiie was succeeded by his son Toshinaga. Tokugawa Ieyasu saw this change of leadership as an opportunity and set a trap for Toshinaga. In 1599, Ieyasu announced that there was an assassination plot against him, and he identified Toshinaga as the mastermind. Toshinaga denied the allegations, but Ieyasu demanded, "If you are innocent, hand over your mother as a hostage." In the Maeda clan, there were two factions: one advocating for fighting against the Tokugawa and another advocating for submission. Intense debates took place, but ultimately, Toshinaga's mother, Matsu, persuaded everyone by saying, "For a samurai family, preserving the household is paramount. Do not destroy the family just for my sake." Toshinaga then sent Matsu as a hostage to the Tokugawa clan. From this point on, the Maeda clan effectively came under the umbrella of the Tokugawa clan and fought on the Tokugawa side in the Battle of Sekigahara (1600).

== Family ==
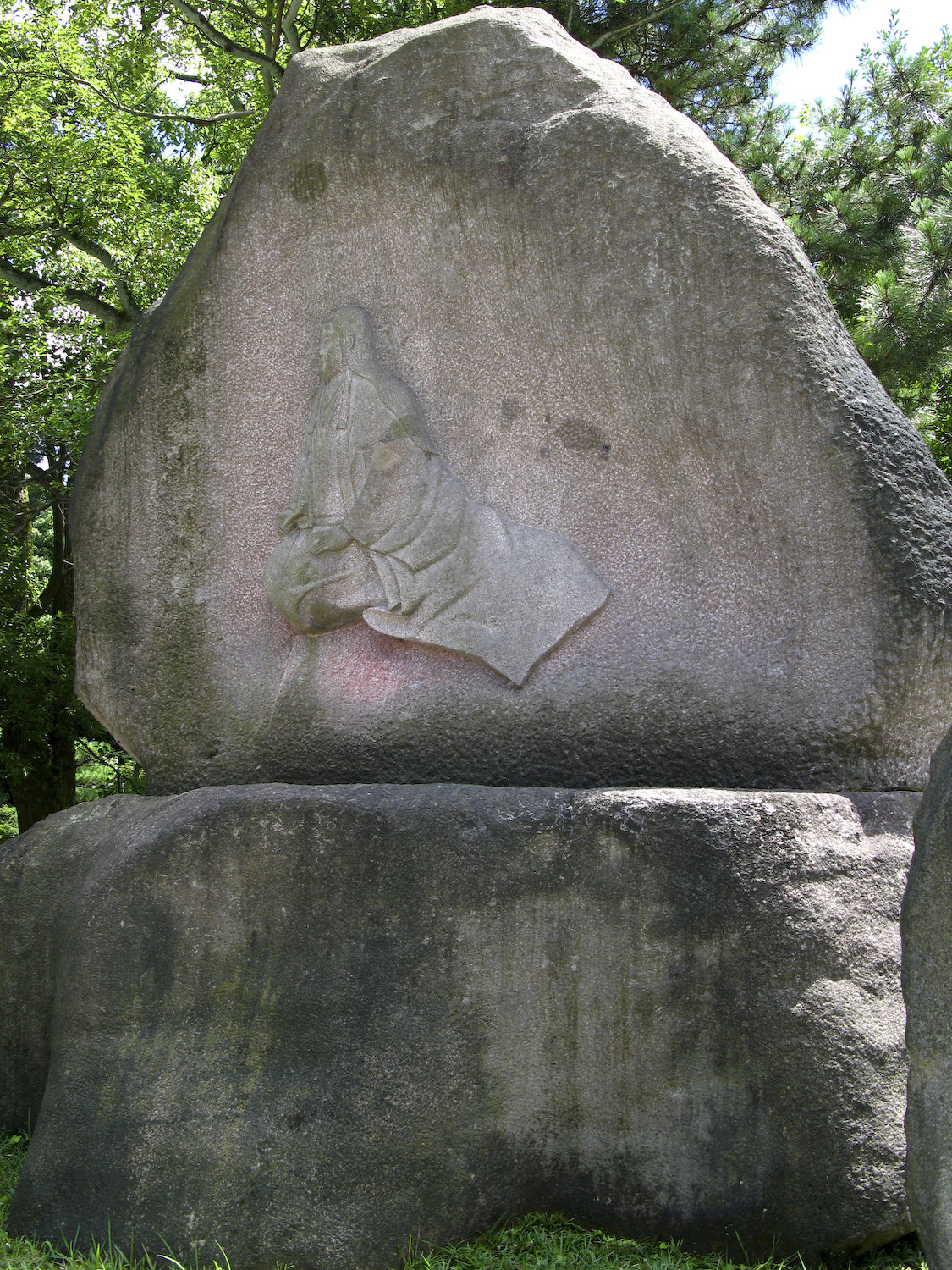
Matsu depicted in a sculpture at the Oyama Shrine in Kanazawa

- Father: Maeda Toshimasa
- Mother: Nagayowai-in (d.1573)
- Siblings:
  - Maeda Toshihisa (d. 1583)
  - Maeda Toshifusa
  - Sawaki Yoshiyuki (d. 1572)
- Half-Siblings:
  - Maeda Yasukatsu (d. 1594)
  - Maeda Hidetsugu (d. 1585)
  - Maeda Masa (given in marriage to Takabatake Sadayoshi)

Toshiie's wife, Maeda Matsu, was famous in her own right. Strong-willed from childhood, she was well-versed in the martial arts and was instrumental in Toshiie's rise to success. After her husband died, Matsu, then known by her Buddhist nun name of Hoshun-in, assured the safety of the Maeda clan after the year 1600 by voluntarily going as a hostage to Edo, capital of the new shōgun, Tokugawa Ieyasu, whom she loathed throughout her life as she watched him, her husband, and Hideyoshi compete for power.

- Wives, concubines, children:
  - Wife: Maeda Matsu (1547–1617)
    - First Daughter: Kohime (1559–1616) married Maeda Nagatane
    - First Son: Maeda Toshinaga (1562–1614)
    - Second daughter: Shohime married Nakagawa Mitsushige
    - Third daughter: Maahime (1572–1605) become Toyotomi Hideyoshi's concubine later Madenokoji Atsufusa's concubine
    - Fourth daughter: Gohime (1574–1634) married Ukita Hideie, Toyotomi Hideyoshi's adopted son.
    - Fifth Daughter: Yome, Asano Yoshinaga's fiancée
    - Second Son: Maeda Toshimasa (1578-1633)
    - Seventh Daughter: Maeda Chiyo (1580–1641) married Hosokawa Tadataka later married Murai Nagatsugu
  - Concubine: Chiyobo (1570–1631) later Kinse-in
    - Fourth son: Maeda Toshitsune (1594–1658)
  - Concubine: Oiwa, later Ryujo-in
    - Sixth daughter: Maeda Kikuhime (1578–1584)
    - Ninth daughter: Yoshi, Takeda Nobuyoshi's fiancée, later married Shinohara Sadahide
    - 3 boys (early life)
  - Concubine: Ozai, later Kinse-in
    - Eighth daughter: Fuku, married Cho Yoshitsura, later married Nakagawa Mitsutada
    - Third son: Maeda Tomoyoshi (1591–1628)
  - Concubine: Jufuku-in
    - Fifth son: Maeda Toshitaka (1594–1637)
  - Concubine: Kaishoin
    - Sixth son: Maeda Toshisada (1598–1620)
  - unknown
    - girl (early life)
  - Nephew: Maeda Toshimasu (1543–1612)

Their sons all became daimyōs in their own right. Their daughters married into prestigious families; the eldest, Kō, married Maeda Nagatane, a distant relative of Toshiie who became a senior Kaga retainer; Ma'a, was a concubine of Toyotomi Hideyoshi and later married Marikouji Mitsurubo, Gō was adopted by Hideyoshi and became the wife of Ukita Hideie, and Chiyo, who was first wedded to Hosokawa Tadaoki's son Tadataka, later married Murai Nagayori's son Nagatsugu. Sho married Nakagawa Mitsushige. Toshi married Shinohara Sadahide. Fuku married Nakagawa Mitsutada.

== Ōdenta sword ==
"Ōdenta (大典太)" or "Great Denta" or "The Best among Swords Forged by Denta". Along with "Onimaru" and "Futatsu-mei", the sword was considered to be one of the three regalia swords of the shoguns of the Ashikaga clan. Later it was passed down to Maeda Toshiie. A legend says the sword healed a daughter of Toshiie and another legend says birds never try to approach a warehouse where this sword is stored.

== In popular culture ==
He is a playable character in video game Sengoku Basara 2 and an unplayable character in video game Sengoku Basara 4. He wields a trident and fire-based attacks. In anime, they were initially servants of Oda Nobunaga, later turned to Toyotomi Hideyoshi. He is a playable character in the video game Samurai Warriors 2: Xtreme Legends and appears in every major samurai warriors title following his first appearance. He wields a single sword and twin spears.

== Honours ==
- Junior First Rank (24 March 1599; posthumously)

== See also ==
- Battle of Nagashino

Preceded by none	Lord of Kanazawa (Kaga Domain); 1583–1599	Succeeded by Maeda Toshinaga
