= Maeda Toshimasa (1578) =

Japanese daimyo

- 前田 利政
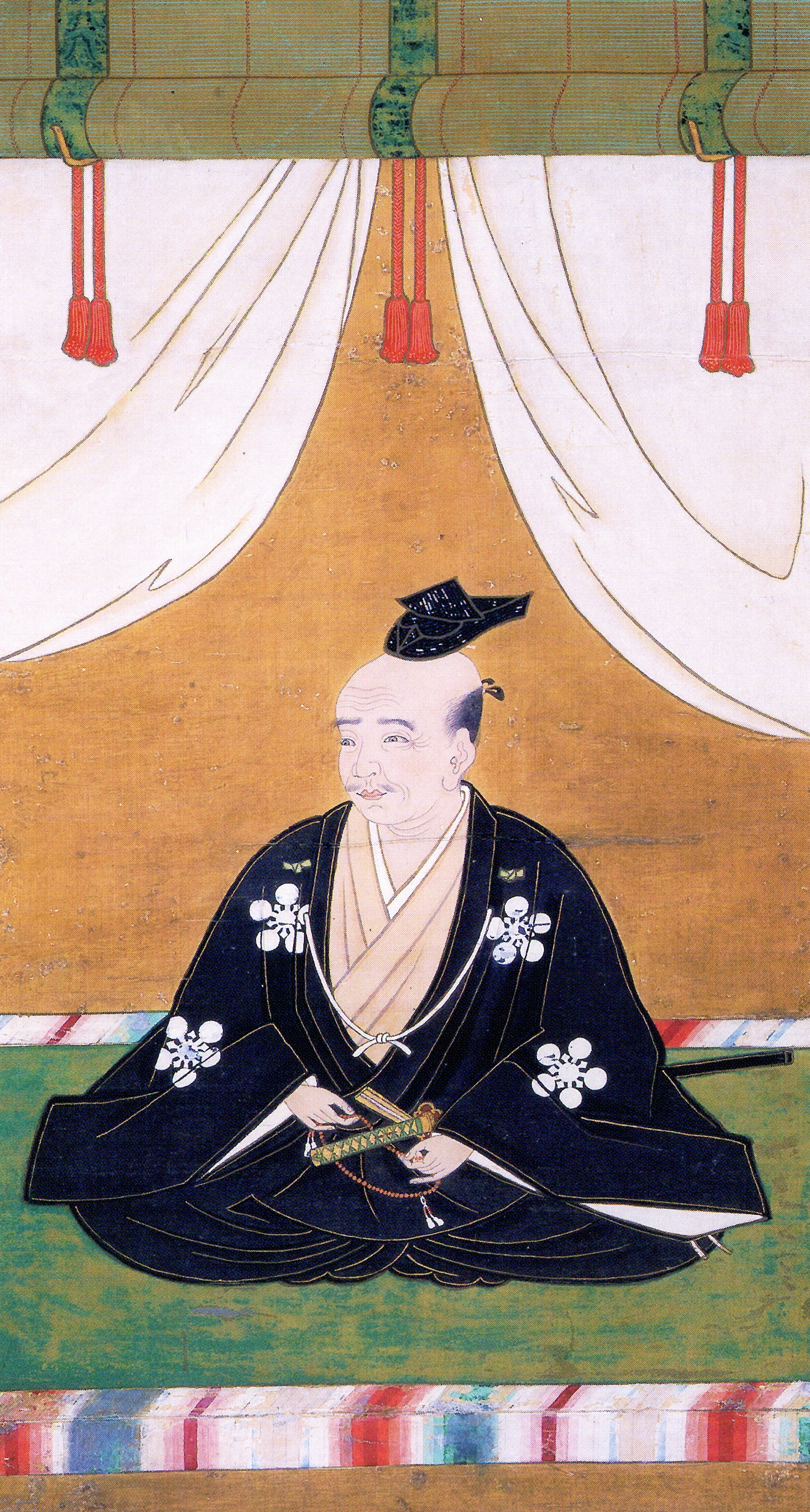

Lord of Noto
- In office 1599–1600
- Succeeded by: Maeda Toshinaga

Personal details
- Born: 1578
- Died: August 18, 1633 (aged 54–55)
- Parents: Maeda Toshiie (father); Maeda Matsu (mother)

Military service
- Allegiance: Toyotomi clan Western army Tokugawa shogunate
- Unit: Maeda clan
- Battles/wars: Battle of Asainawate

Maeda Toshimasa (前田 利政; 1578 – August 18, 1633) was a Japanese daimyō of the Sengoku period to the early Edo period, belonging to the Maeda clan. He was the second son of Maeda Toshiie and Maeda Matsu.

== Biography ==
In 1599 he was given a 215,000 koku fief in Noto province after his father's death. He sided with the Western army, supported Ishida Mitsunari during the Sekigahara Campaign and had evidently plotted to assassinate Tokugawa Ieyasu beforehand. His brother Maeda Toshinaga sided with the Eastern army of Tokugawa Ieyasu. Due to the crisis between the Maeda family, his mother Maeda Matsu went to Edo voluntarily as hostage to prevent the decline of the Maeda clan.

After Mitsunari's defeat, Toshimasa was forced to retreat and surrender his lands to his older brother, Toshinaga. Due to his mother's appeals, Toshimasa was saved from execution and later he was confined to Kyoto and became a monk.

When the Osaka campaign began, Toshimasa was invited to join both sides. However he refused the offers and for this he was offered a reward from Ieyasu, who was also refused.

Maeda Toshimasa died at 55 in Kyoto, and his son Maeda Naoyuki became servant of the Maeda Toshitsune of Kaga province.

== Bibliography ==
- Edmond Papinot, Historical and geographical dictionary of Japan, F. Ungar Pub. Co., 1964, p. 350.
