= Maeda Toshimasa =

Japanese samurai of the Sengoku period

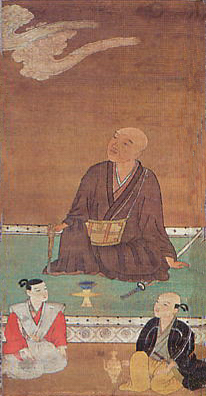

Maeda Toshimasa (前田 利昌; ? – August 4, 1560) was a Japanese samurai of the Sengoku period. Also known as Toshiharu (利春), he was the son of Maeda Toshitaka. His seat was Arako Castle in Owari Province. Toshimasa was a vassal of Oda Nobuhide, who nominally ruled Owari Province from his seat at Kiyosu Castle.

== Family ==
- Father: Maeda Toshitaka
- Wife: Nagayowai-in (d. 1573)
  - First son: Maeda Toshihisa (d. 1587?)
  - Second son: Maeda Toshifusa
  - Fourth son: Maeda Toshiie (1539–1599), lord of the "Million Koku Kaga Domain".
  - Fifth son: Sawaki Yoshiyuki (d. 1573)
- unknown
  - Third son: Maeda Yasukatsu (d. 1594)
  - Sixth son: Maeda Hidetsugu (d. 1586)
  - First daughter: Maeda Masa (given in marriage to Takabatake Sadayoshi)

== Popular culture ==
Maeda Toshimasa was depicted by Bunta Sugawara in the 2002 NHK historical drama Toshiie to Matsu (利家とまつ).
