= Kabukimono =

Gangs of samurai in feudal Japan

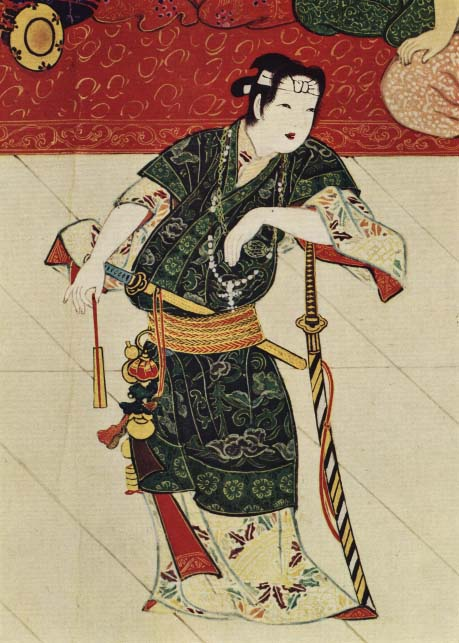
The kabukimono were a group that dressed in a peculiar style and spoke in a vernacular which matched their often outrageous behaviour.

Kabukimono (傾奇者) or hatamoto yakko (旗本奴) were gangs of samurai in feudal Japan. First appearing in the Azuchi–Momoyama period (between the end of the Muromachi period in 1573 and the beginning of the Edo period in 1603) as the turbulent Sengoku period drew to a close, kabukimono were either rōnin, wandering samurai, or men who had once worked for samurai families who, during times of peace, formed street gangs. Some, however, were also members of more prominent clans—most notably Oda Nobunaga and Maeda Toshiie.

== Etymology ==
The term kabukimono is often translated into English as "strange things" or "the crazy ones", believed to be derived from kabuku, meaning "to slant" or "to deviate"; the term is also the origin of the name for kabuki theatre (歌舞伎) as the founder of kabuki, Izumo no Okuni, took heavy inspiration from the kabukimono (歌舞伎者). The kanji used are ateji, used for their pronunciation, and not their inherent meaning.

== Description ==
Kabukimono would often dress in flamboyant clothing, disregarding traditional colours such as light yellow and dark blue, often accessorised by wearing haori jackets with lead weights in the hem, velvet lapels, wide obi belts and even women's clothing. Exoticism was characteristic and included items such as European clothing, Chinese hats, and jinbaori (surcoats) made from Persian carpet. Kabukimono also often had uncommon hairstyles and facial hair, either styled up in various fashions or left to grow long. Their katana would often have fancy hilts, large or square tsuba, red scabbards and were usually longer than normal length. Some kabukimono even used extremely long kiseru pipes as weapons.

== Gang activities ==
Kabukimono were known for their violent and unsociable behavior, such as not paying at restaurants or robbing townsfolk. Cases of the gang members cutting people down simply to test a new sword (tsujigiri), or larger-scale violent incidents were common in areas where kabukimono could be found (particularly in large cities such as Edo and Kyoto). Wrestling, loud singing and dancing in the streets were also common, as was fighting between gangs after dark. The peak of kabukimono activity was during the Keichō period (1596–1615), although also during that time, the bakufu (shogunate) became more strict, and the kabukimono faded away.

== Later influence ==
It is thought that the modern yakuza originated from either groups of kabukimono or bands of villagers gathered to fight their abusers, though other scholars believe that the yakuza origins are to be found in the machi yakko (町奴), a form of private police.

== See also ==
- Bōsōzoku
- Hooliganism
