= Nanokaichi Domain =

Feudal domain in Edo-period Japan

Nanokaichi Domain 七日市藩
- under Tokugawa shogunate Japan
- 1616–1871
- Capital: Nanokaichi jin'ya
  - Type: Daimyō
- Historical era: Edo period
  - Established: 1616
  - Disestablished: 1871
- Today part of: part of Gunma Prefecture

Nanokaichi Domain (七日市藩, Nanokaichi-han) was a feudal domain under the Tokugawa shogunate of Edo period Japan, located in Kōzuke Province (modern-day Gunma Prefecture), Japan. It was centered on Nanokaichi jin'ya in what is now part of the city of Tomioka, Gunma. Parts of the jin'ya, including the daimyō residence and gardens are preserved on the original site (now part of Tomioka High School). Nanokaichi was ruled throughout its history by a junior branch of the Maeda clan of Kaga.

== History ==
Maeda Toshitaka, the 5th son of Maeda Toshiie was awarded a fief of 10,000 koku by Tokugawa Ieyasu for his services during the Siege of Osaka. The location of the new holding in Kōzuke Province was selected partly to provide the Maeda clan a convenient stopping point in the sankin-kōtai procession to the shōgun's court in Edo.

During the rule of Maeda Toshiyoshi, the 11th daimyō of Nanokaichi, an extensive fiscal reform program was undertaken. However, during the rule of his successor, Maeda Toshiakira, although a domain academy was established, the jin'ya along with most of the town burned down in a fire and the domain suffered from repeated crop failures, leading to a request for assistance to the parent house in Kaga Domain.

During the Boshin War, the domain sided with the imperial forces. After the end of the conflict, with the abolition of the han system in July 1871, Nanokaichi Domain became Nanokaichi Prefecture, which later became part of Gunma Prefecture. The domain had a population of 614 in 174 households per a census in 1840. The domain's residence in Edo was located near Hanzōmon

== Holdings at the end of the Edo period ==
Unlike most domains in the han system, which typically consisted of several discontinuous territories calculated to provide the assigned kokudaka, based on periodic cadastral surveys and projected agricultural yields. Nanokaichi Domain was a unitary domain with 21 villages in Kanra District, Kōzuke Province.

- Kōzuke Province
  - 21 villages in Kanra District

== List of daimyōs ==
#	Name	Tenure	Courtesy title	Court Rank	kokudaka
Maeda clan (Tozama) 1616–1871
1	Maeda Toshitaka (前田利孝)	1616–1637	Yamato-no-kami (大和守)	Lower 5th (従五 位下)	10,000 koku
2	Maeda Toshimoto (前田利意)	1637–1685	Ukon-daifu (兵部少輔)	Lower 5th (従五位下)	10,000 koku
3	Maeda Toshihiro (前田利広)	1685–1693	unknown	Lower 5th (従五位下)	10,000 koku
4	Maeda Toshiyoshi (前田利慶)	1693–1695	unknown	Lower 5th (従五位下)	10,000 koku
5	Maeda Toshifuda (前田利英)	1695–1708	unknown	Lower 5th (従五位下)	10,000 koku
6	Maeda Toshitada (前田利理)	1708–1756	Tango-no-kami (丹後守)	Lower 5th (従五位下)	10,000 koku
7	Maeda Toshihisa (前田利尚)	1756–1782	Yamato-no-kami (大和守)	Lower 5th (従五位下)	10,000 koku
8	Maeda Toshiakira (前田利見)	1782–1786	Ukon-e-no-shogen (右近将監)	Lower 5th (従五位下)	10,000 koku
9	Maeda Toshomochi (前田利以)	1786–1808	Yamato-no-kami (大和守)	Lower 5th (従五位下)	10,000 koku
10	Maeda Toshiyoshi (前田利和)	1808–1839	Yamato-no-kami (大和守)	Lower 5th (従五位下)	10,000 koku
11	Maeda Toshiakira (II) 前田利豁	1840–1869	Tango-no-kami (丹後守)	Lower 5th (従五位下)	10,000 koku
12	Maeda Toshikaki 前田利昭	1869–1871	Hizen-no-kami (肥前守)	Lower 5th (従五位下)	10,000 koku
