= Matsudaira Daini =

- Born: 1823
- Died: September 11, 1864 (aged 40–41)
- Burial place: Myōkei-ji (妙慶寺), Kanazawa, Ishikawa; Shōgyōin (正行院), Makino, Shiga
- Other names: Matsudaira Yasumasa, Tetsukichirō, Genba
- Relatives: Father: Matsudaira Kyūbee
- Military career
- Era: Bakumatsu

Matsudaira Yasumasa (松平 康正), better known as Matsudaira Daini (松平 大弐; 1823 – 11 September 1864), was a Kaga samurai of the Bakumatsu who served as a karō to the Maeda clan. His common names were Tetsukichirō (鉄吉郎) and Genba (玄蕃).

== Biography ==
Daini was born as the second son of Matsudaira Kyūbee (松平 久兵衛), a karō of Kaga Domain, in 1823. The Matsudaira family, as retainers to the Maeda clan, held 4,000 koku within Kaga. Daini watched over Komatsu Castle from 1856, and was a bugyō to Maeda Yoshiyasu, the heir to the fiefdom of Kaga, from 1860. He became a karō in 1863, and went to Kyoto in 1864.

As a soba yōnin (側用人), Daini accompanied Yoshiyasu to Kyoto in an attempt for mediation between the Chōshū samurai and the Tokugawa shogunate at the time of the Kinmon incident in 1864. The mediation failed, and in the ensuing battle, Yoshiyasu fled Kyoto. Maeda Nariyasu, Yoshiyasu's father, placed Yoshiyasu under house arrest. Daini took responsibility for Yoshiyasu's role in the Kinmon incident, and was forced to perform seppuku with Sagawa Yoshisuke as his kaishakunin. Yoshisuke recounted the circumstances of Daini's seppuku in his diary. Daini is interred at Shōgyōin (正行院) in Makino, Shiga, while his head is enshrined at Myōkei-ji (妙慶寺) in Kanazawa.

In 1879, buildings owned by the Ishikawa Prefecture Kanazawa Hospital were built on the site where Daini's family once resided.
