= Maeda Toshinori =

Maeda Toshinori may refer to:

- Maeda Toshinori (Daishoji) (1833–1855), daimyō of Daishoji Domain
- Maeda Toshinori (Toyama) (1787-1801), daimyō of Toyama Domain

== See also ==
- Maeda clan
