= Maeda Toshiyasu =

Maeda Toshiyasu may refer to:

- Maeda Toshiyasu (Daishoji) (1779–1806), daimyō of Daishoji Domain
- Maeda Toshiyasu (Toyama) (1800–1859), naturalist, entomologist and daimyō of Toyama Domain

== See also ==
- Maeda clan
