= Maeda Toshitaka =

Maeda Toshitaka may refer to:

- Maeda Toshitaka (Nanokaichi) (1616–1637), daimyō of Nanokaichi Domain
- Maeda Toshitaka (Toyama) (1690-1745), daimyō of Toyama Domain

== See also ==
- Maeda clan
