= Daishōji Domain =

Tozama feudal domain of Edo period Japan

Daishōji Domain 大聖寺藩
- under Tokugawa shogunate Japan
- 1639–1871
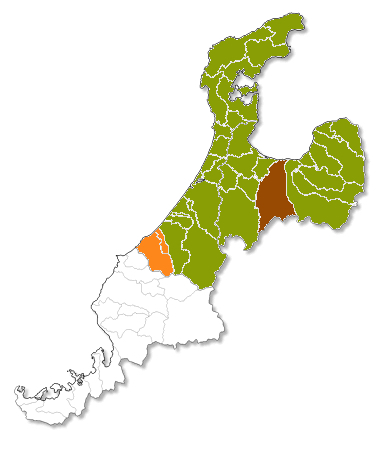
- Kaga Toyama and Daishoji han in late Edo period, Daishiki Domain in orange, Kaga Domain in green, Toyama Domain in brown
- Capital: Daishōji jin'ya
- Area
  - Coordinates: 40°30′53.1″N 141°29′16.3″E
  - Type: Daimyō
- Historical era: Edo period
  - Split from Kaga Domain: 1639
  - Disestablished: 1871
- Today part of: Ishikawa Prefecture

Daishōji Domain (大聖寺藩, Daishōji-han) was a tozama feudal domain of Edo period Japan It was located in Kaga Province, in the Hokuriku region of Japan. The domain was centered at Daishōji jin'ya, located in the center of what is now the city of Kaga in Ishikawa Prefecture. It was ruled by a cadet branch of the Maeda clan.

The daimyō of Daishōji domain was subject to sankin-kōtai, and was received in the Ōhiroma of Edo Castle.

== History ==
Daishōji Castle was a secondary stronghold of the Maeda clan, guarding the border region of Kaga Province from neighboring Echizen Province. The castle was destroyed by the order of the Tokugawa shogunate in 1615 under the policy of “One Domain - One Castle”. In 1639, the daimyō of Kaga Domain, Maeda Toshitsune retired, turning the domain over to his eldest son, Maeda Mitsutaka. At that time, he separated out a 100,000 koku holding for his second son, Maeda Toshitsugu, creating Toyama Domain and a 70,000 koku holding for his third son, Maeda Toshiharu, creating Daishōji Domain.

At the time of its creation, the domain consisted of 133 villages in Enuma District for a total of 65,700 koku, and 9 villages in Niikawa District on the far eastern side of Etchū Province for a total of 4300 koku. In 1660, Daishōji Domain was able to exchange this remote exclave for 6 villages in Nomi District, adjacent to Enuma District.

Under its third daimyō, Maeda Toshinao, new riceland development allowed the domain to create its own subsidiary 10,000 koku domain, ’Daishōji-Shinden Domain’ (大聖寺新田藩, Daishōji-Shinden han), for Toshinao's younger brother Maeda Toshimasa. However, after Toshimasa killed the daimyō of Yanagimoto Domain, Oda Hidechika in a duel, the domain was dissolved.

Under its 9th daimyō, Maeda Toshikore, the domain's kokudaka was increased from 70,000 to 100,000 koku. This was accomplished by 10,000 koku of new rice land developed, and 20,000 koku of revenues from Kaga Domain. The physical holdings of the domain did not change.

After the death of its 12th daimyō, Maeda Toshinori in 1855 without heir, the domain came under threat of attainder. Toshinori had adopted Maeda Toshimichi as his heir, but Toshiyuki also died before his formal presentation to the shōgun. This fact was concealed from the authorities, and Maeda Toshika, a son of Maeda Nariyasu of Kaga Domain was substituted in his place. During the Bakumatsu period, the domain changed sides to support the Satchō Alliance during the Boshin War, and fought for the imperial side during the Battle of Hokuetsu. Toshika was named Imperial governor by the Meiji government from 1869 until the abolition of the han system in 1871.

In July 1871, with the abolition of the han system, Daishōji Domain became Daishōji Prefecture, and was merged into the newly created Ishikawa Prefecture in September 1871. The site of the Daishōji jin'ya is now a park, with a portion of the ramparts remaining within the grounds of Kinjō Elementary School.

== List of daimyōs ==
- Maeda clan (Tozama) 1639–1871

	Name	Tenure	Courtesy title	Court Rank	kokudaka
1	Maeda Toshiharu (前田利治)	1639–1660	Jijū (侍従)	Senior 4th Rank, Lower Grade (正四位下)	70,000 koku
2	Maeda Toshiaki (前田利明)	1660–1692	Hida-no-kami (飛騨守)	Junior 4th Rank, Lower Grade (従四位下)	70,000 koku
3	Maeda Toshinao (前田利直)	1692–1710	Hida-no-kami (飛騨守)	Junior 4th Rank, Lower Grade (従四位下)	70,000 koku
4	Maeda Toshiakira (前田利章)	1711–1737	Bingo-no-kami (備後守)	Junior 4th Rank, Lower Grade (従四位下)	70,000 koku''
5	Maeda Toshimichi (前田利道)	1737–1778	Tōtōmi-no-kami (遠江守)	Junior 4th Rank, Lower Grade (従四位下)	70,000 koku
6	Maeda Toshiaki (前田利精)	1778–1782	Bingo-no-kami (備後守)	Junior 4th Rank, Lower Grade (従四位下)	70,000 koku''
7	Maeda Toshitane (前田利物)	1782–1788	Mino-no-kami (美濃守)	Junior 4th Rank, Lower Grade (従四位下)	70,000 koku''
8	Maeda Toshiyasu (前田利考)	1788–1806	Hida-no-kami (飛騨守)	Junior 4th Rank, Lower Grade (従四位下)	70,000 koku
9	Maeda Toshikore (前田利之)	1806–1837	Bingo-no-kami (備後守); Jijū (侍従)	Junior 4th Rank, Lower Grade (従四位下)	70,000 ->100,000 koku
10	Maeda Toshinaka (前田利極)	1837–1838	Tōtōmi-no-kami (遠江守), Jijū (侍従)	Junior 4th Rank, Lower Grade (従四位下)	100,000 koku
11	Maeda Toshihira (前田利平)	1838–1849	Bingo-no-kami (備後守)	Junior 4th Rank, Lower Grade (従四位下)	100,000 koku
12	Maeda Toshinori (前田利義)	1849–1855	Bingo-no-kami (備後守)	Junior 4th Rank, Lower Grade (従四位下)	100,000 koku
13	Maeda Toshimichi (前田利行)	1855–1871	none -	none -	100,000 koku
14	Maeda Toshika (前田利鬯)	1842–1871	Hida-no-kami (飛騨守)	Senior 2nd Rank (正二位)	100,000 koku

=== Maeda Toshiharu ===
Maeda Toshiharu (前田利治; 1618 – May 29, 1660) Toshiharu was the third son of Maeda Toshitsune, 2nd daimyō of Kaga Domain. On the retirement of his father in 1639, he was assigned a 70,000 koku estate centered in what is now Enuma District, Ishikawa. This marked the start of Daishōji Domain. Toshiharu was a noted master of the Japanese tea ceremony, having been a disciple of Kobori Enshū. While daimyō, he developed gold and copper mines, and later established Kutani ware as a noted product of the domain. His wife was the daughter of Uesugi Sadakatsu of Yonezawa Domain.

=== Maeda Toshiaki I ===
Maeda Toshiaki (前田利明; January 28, 1638 – June 27, 1692) was the 2nd daimyō of Daishōji Domain. He was born in Kanazawa as the fifth son of Maeda Toshitsune, 2nd daimyō of Kaga Domain and was posthumously adopted by his elder brother Maeda Toshiharu to become daimyō in 1660. During his tenure, he undertook flood control projects and opened up new rice lands. He also developed washi paper as a revenue source for the domain. His wife was the daughter of Uesugi Sadakatsu of Yonezawa Domain. His grave is at the temple of Jisshō-in in Kaga, Ishikawa.

=== Maeda Toshinao ===
Maeda Toshinao (前田利直; July 19, 1672 – January 31, 1711) was the 3rd daimyō of Daishōji Domain. He was born in Edo the eldest son of Maeda Toshiaki, and was received in formal audience by Shōgun Tokugawa Tsunayoshi in 1684. Tsunayoshi favored Toshinao, so from 1691 the domain was accorded the same status and privileges as a fudai domain. On becoming daimyō in 1692, Toshinao divided 10,000 koku from his holdings to establish his younger brother, Toshimasa, as daimyō of Daishōji-Shiden Domain. However, due to Tsunayoshi's favor, Toshinao spent all of his time in Edo, leaving the domain to be managed by his vassals and lent a deaf ear to word of troubles. In the year 1709, the domain's Edo residence burned down, and Tsunayoshi also died, thus plunging the domain finances into arrears while depriving him of his main benefactor. Furthermore, his brother Maeda Toshimasa was forced to commit seppuku after having killed Oda Hidechika, the daimyō of Yanagimoto Domain in Yamato Province in a duel and his domain was forfeited. Toshinao died the following year in 1710 under uncertain circumstances. Yoshineo's wife was the daughter of Sakai Tadayoshi of Shōnai Domain. His grave is at the temple of Jisshō-in in Kaga, Ishikawa.

=== Maeda Toshiakira ===
Maeda Toshiakira (前田利章; April 14, 1691 – September 29, 1737) was the 4th daimyō of Daishōji Domain. He was born in Kanazawa as the 5th son of Maeda Tsunanori, 4th daimyō of Kaga Domain, and was adopted in 1709 by his great-uncle, Maeda Toshinao, as heir. He became daimyō a few months later in 1710. Ignoring warnings by his father and the perilous financial situation of the domain, he lived in profligate luxury. When a crop failure occurred in 1712, he faced a peasant rebellion. In 1732, he was ordered to contribute to repairs on Edo Castle, which further bankrupted the domain. Toshiakira failed to take an official wife. His grave is at the temple of Jisshō-in in Kaga, Ishikawa.

=== Maeda Toshimichi I ===
Maeda Toshimichi (前田利道; June 6, 1733 – February 6, 1781) was the 5th daimyō of Daishōji Domain. He was eldest son of Maeda Toshiakira, and inherited a bankrupt domain from his father in 1737. In 1752, the domain was ordered to contribute to the rebuilding of the Yoshida Bridge on the Tōkaidō highway in what is now Toyohashi, Aichi. The bridge collapsed after only 6 month due to poor design and construction, and the domain was forced to rebuild it again. Unable to rectify the finances of the domain, he retired in 1778 and died in 1781. Toshimichi's wife was the daughter of Maeda Toshitaka of Toyama Domain. His grave is at the temple of Jisshō-in in Kaga, Ishikawa.

=== Maeda Toshiaki II ===
Maeda Toshiaki (前田利精; December 15, 1758 – October 12, 1791) was the 6th daimyō of Daishōji Domain. He was born in Daishoji as the second son of Maeda Toshimichi and became heir in 1759 on the death of his elder brother. He became daimyō in 1778 on the retirement of his father; however, by the time of his father's death in 1781, Toshiaki increasingly showed signs of insanity, raving incoherently and behaving violently. The clan elders petitioned Maeda Harunaga of Kaga Domain to intervene, and Toshiaki was confined to house arrest in 1782, with the domain going to his younger brother. He died in 1791 at the age of 34.

=== Maeda Toshitane ===
Maeda Toshitane (前田利物; March 5, 1760 – October 26, 1788) was the 7th daimyō of Daishōji Domain. Toshiane was the third son of Maeda Toshimichi, and replaced his brother Toshiaki as the latter's son, Maeda Toshiyasu, was still an infant. However, the domain continued to suffer from financial difficulties and poor harvests, and Toshitane was unable to implement any reforms due to his own youth. He died in 1788 at the age of 29. Toshitane's wife was the daughter of Maeda Toshiyuki of Toyama Domain. His grave is at the temple of Jisshō-in in Kaga, Ishikawa.

=== Maeda Toshiyasu ===
Maeda Toshiyasu (前田利考; February 25, 1779 – February 13, 1806) was the 8th daimyō of Daishōji Domain. Toshiyasu was the son of Maeda Toshiaki, and was born in Edo. As he was still an infant, his uncle, Maeda Toshitane acted as regent, and also adopted Toshiyasu as heir. Toshiyasu became daimyō on Toshitane's death in 1788. Unlike his father and uncle, he was able to restore the clan government through discipline and fiscal reforms, and the encouragement of the military arts. Although he died at the age of 27 in 1806, and despite his youth, he was regarded as one of the most capable of the daimyō of Daishoji. His grave is at the temple of Jisshō-in in Kaga, Ishikawa.

=== Maeda Toshikore ===
Maeda Toshikore (前田利之; November 18, 1785 – January 16, 1837) was the 9th daimyō of Daishōji Domain. Toshikore was born in Daishōji as the third son of Maeda Toshitane. He was posthumously adopted as heir to Maeda Toshiyasu after Toshiyasu's sudden death in 1806. In 1821, following the request of Maeda Narinaga, the domain's kokudaka was increased to 100,000 koku. However, this additional revenue was more than offset by increased military service by the shogunate, so the domain's financial situation was even worse off than before. Toshikore died in Daishōji in 1837 at the age of 52. Toshitane's wife was the daughter of Sakai Tadaari of Shōnai Domain. His grave is at the temple of Jisshō-in in Kaga, Ishikawa.

=== Maeda Toshinaka ===
Maeda Toshinaka (前田利極; November 24, 1812 – October 29, 1838) was the 10th daimyō of Daishōji Domain. Toshinaka was the younger son of Maeda Toshikore, and was born in Edo. He became daimyō in 1837 on the death of his father, but died only a couple of months later. Toshinaka's wife was the daughter of Maeda Narinaga of Kaga Domain. His grave is at the temple of Jisshō-in in Kaga, Ishikawa.

=== Maeda Toshihira ===
Maeda Toshihira (前田利平; January 22, 1824 – August 24, 1849) was the 11th daimyō of Daishōji Domain. Toshihira was the sixth son of Maeda Toshikore, and was born in Daishōji. He became daimyō on the death of his elder brother in 1838, but the domain was in severe financial straits, which was compounded by a reduction in the domain kokudaka from 100,000 koku back to its original 70,000 koku. All his ideas for reform, including selling off the clan residence in Edo, were blocked by Kaga Domain, and he died in 1849 at the age of 27. Toshihira's wife was the daughter of Inoue Masaharu of Tatebayashi Domain. His grave is at the temple of Jisshō-in in Kaga, Ishikawa.

=== Maeda Toshinori ===
Maeda Toshinori (前田利義; April 7, 1833 – June 4, 1855) was the 12th daimyō of Daishōji Domain. Toshinori was the third son of Maeda Nariyasu of Kaga Domain and was born in Kanazawa. He was assigned to Daishōji Domain on the sudden death of Maeda Toshihira in 1849. He died in Edo in 1855 at the age of 23. Toshinori's wife was the daughter of Maeda Toshiyasu of Toyama Domain. His grave is at the temple of Jisshō-in in Kaga, Ishikawa.

=== Maeda Toshimichi II ===
Maeda Toshimichi (前田利行; August 20, 1835 – July 1, 1855) was the 13th daimyō of Daishōji Domain. Toshimichi was born in Kanazawa as the fifth son of Maeda Nariyasu, and was posthumously adopted as the son of Maeda Toshinori after the latter's sudden death in 1855. However, Toshimichi himself died less than a month later at the age of 21. As he had not yet even been received in formal audience by Shōgun Tokugawa Iesada yet, the domain would normally face attainder; however Maeda Nariyasu ordered that the death be concealed, and that his seventh son Maeda Toshika be named daimyō instead.

=== Maeda Toshika ===
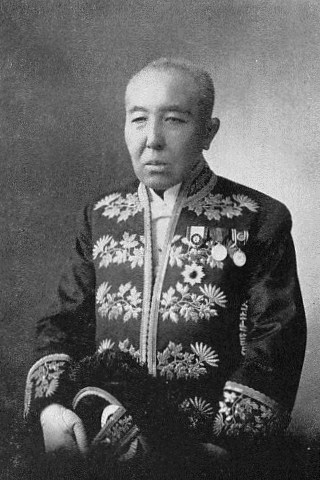
Maeda Toshika in 1913

Viscount Maeda Toshika (前田利鬯; July 29, 1841 – July 27, 1920) was the 14th and final daimyō of Daishōji Domain. Toshika was the 7th son of Maeda Nariyasu of Kaga Domain and became daimyō of Daishōji in 1855. During the Bakumatsu period, the domain assisted the shogunate in policing of Kyoto and the suppression of the Mito Rebellion and in the Kinmon Incident; however, after the Battle of Toba-Fushimi, the domain changed sides to support the Satchō Alliance during the Boshin War, and fought for the Meiji government during the Battle of Hokuetsu. Toshika was named Imperial governor from 1869 until the abolition of the han system in 1871. In 1884 he was awarded the kazoku peerage title of viscount. In 1887 he was raised to Second Court Rank. He died in Tokyo in 1920 at the age of 80. His wife was the daughter of Itō Suketomo of Obi Domain, and his grave is at the Zōshigaya Cemetery in Tokyo.

== Bakumatsu period holdings ==
As with most domains in the han system, Daishōji Domain consisted of territories calculated to provide the assigned kokudaka, based on periodic cadastral surveys and projected agricultural yields.

- Kaga Province
  - 143 villages in Enuma District (entire district)
  - 6 villages in Nomi District

== See also ==
- List of Han
- Maeda clan
