= Chō Tsuratatsu =

Japanese samurai (1546–1619)

Chō Tsuratatsu (長 連龍)
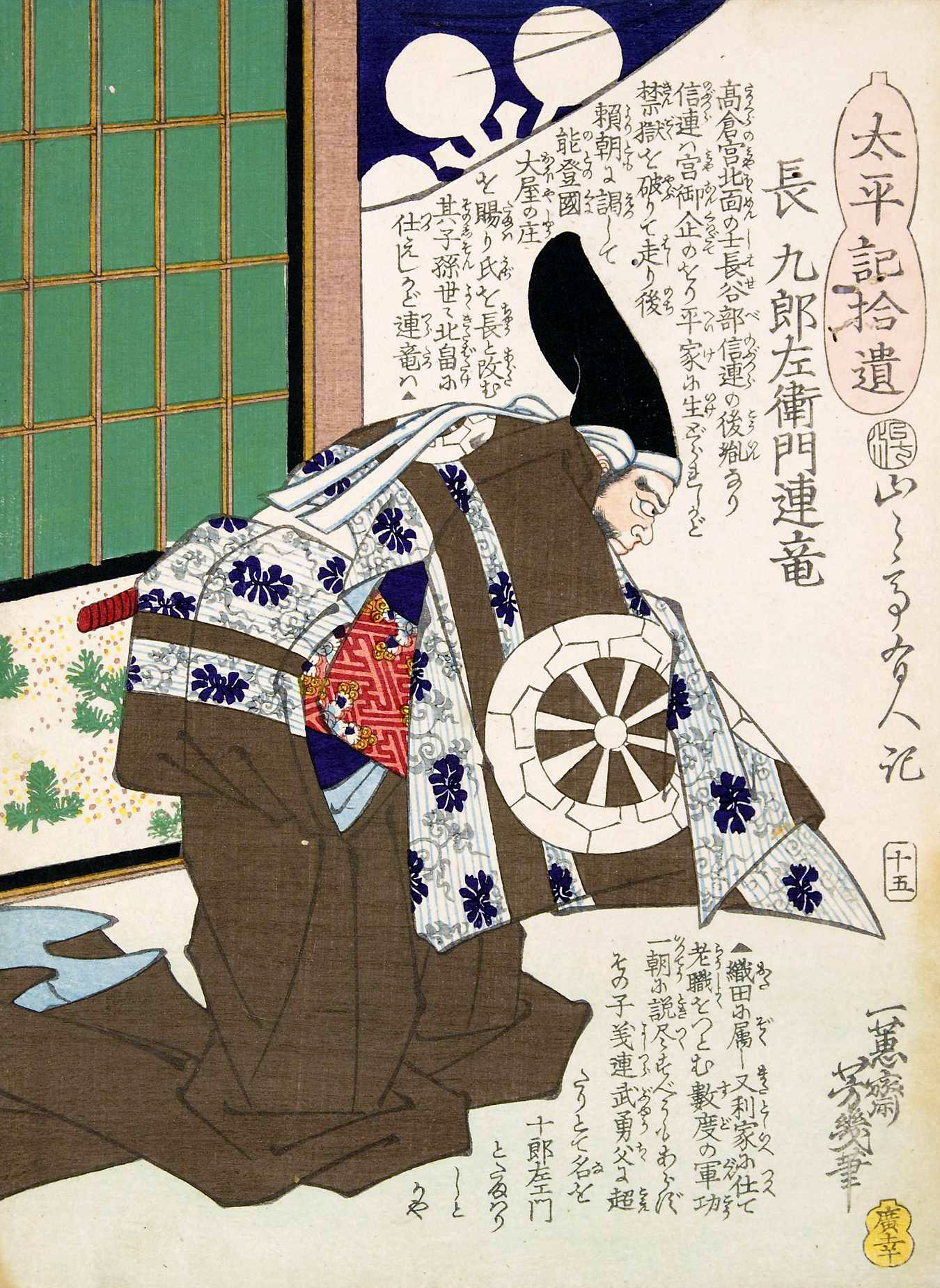
- From Heroes of the Taiheiki, painted by Ochiai Yoshiiku.
- Burial place: Toreiji-temple
- Other names: Kurozaemon, Kouonji
- Spouse(s): Seishitsu:Jimbo Ujiharu's younger sister, Keishitsu: Chō Tsunatsura's daughter
- Children: Yoshitsura, Tsurayori, Inoko (Asaga Saemon's wife), Kuri (Maeda Toshitsune's Sokushitsu), Takeshima-dono (Maeda Naotomo's wife, Maeda Toshinaga's adoptive daughter)
- Relatives: Cho Tsugutsura (father), Tsunatsura, Sugiyama Norinao, Tsuratatsu, Iigawa Yoshizane, Tsuratsune, Tsuramori
- Military career
- Era: Sengoku period-Edo period

Chō Tsuratatsu (長 連龍; September 9, 1546 – March 18, 1619) was a Japanese samurai of the late Sengoku period to early Edo period, who served the Hatakeyama clan, Oda clan, and then the Maeda clan of the Kaga Domain.

== Biography ==
The son of Chō Tsugutsura, Tsuratatsu was originally from Noto Province. He became a monk later in life, remaining as such until 1577. That year, Tsuratatsu's elder brother joined Oda Nobunaga during his invasion of Noto, and convinced Tsuratatsu to do the same, thus the Chō family became the established power within the province. Tsuratatsu supported his master by repeatedly engaging in conflicts against the Ikkō-ikki, and most notably assisted Shibata Katsuie in his campaign to liberate Kaga Province from the influence of the Ikkō in 1580. In return for Tsuratatsu's conviction, Nobunaga granted him land confiscated from the Isurugi Shrine of Echizen Province. That same year Tsuratatsu became a high ranking yoriki under the jurisdiction of Maeda Toshiie, but was later made a direct vassal of the Maeda, following the Incident at Honnō-ji. Tsuratatsu assisted Tokugawa Ieyasu in the Sekigahara Campaign of 1600. Tsuratatsu died in what is now Nanao, in 1619. His descendants continued to serve the Maeda clan, received a stipend of 30,000 koku, and had karō status.

One of Tsuratatsu's descendants, Chō Tsurahide, was one of the assassins of Ōkubo Toshimichi.

== Bibliography ==
- 石川県, ed. (1933). 石川県史. 第壹編 (in Japanese). 石川県.
- (in Japanese) "Chō-shi" on Harimaya.com (18 Feb. 2008)
