= Maeda Toshiaki =

Maeda Toshiaki may refer to:

- Maeda Toshiaki I (1638–1692), daimyō of Daishōji Domain from 1660 to 1692
- Maeda Toshiaki II (1758–1791), daimyō of Daishōji Domain from 1778 to 1791

== See also ==
- Maeda clan
- Daishōji Domain
