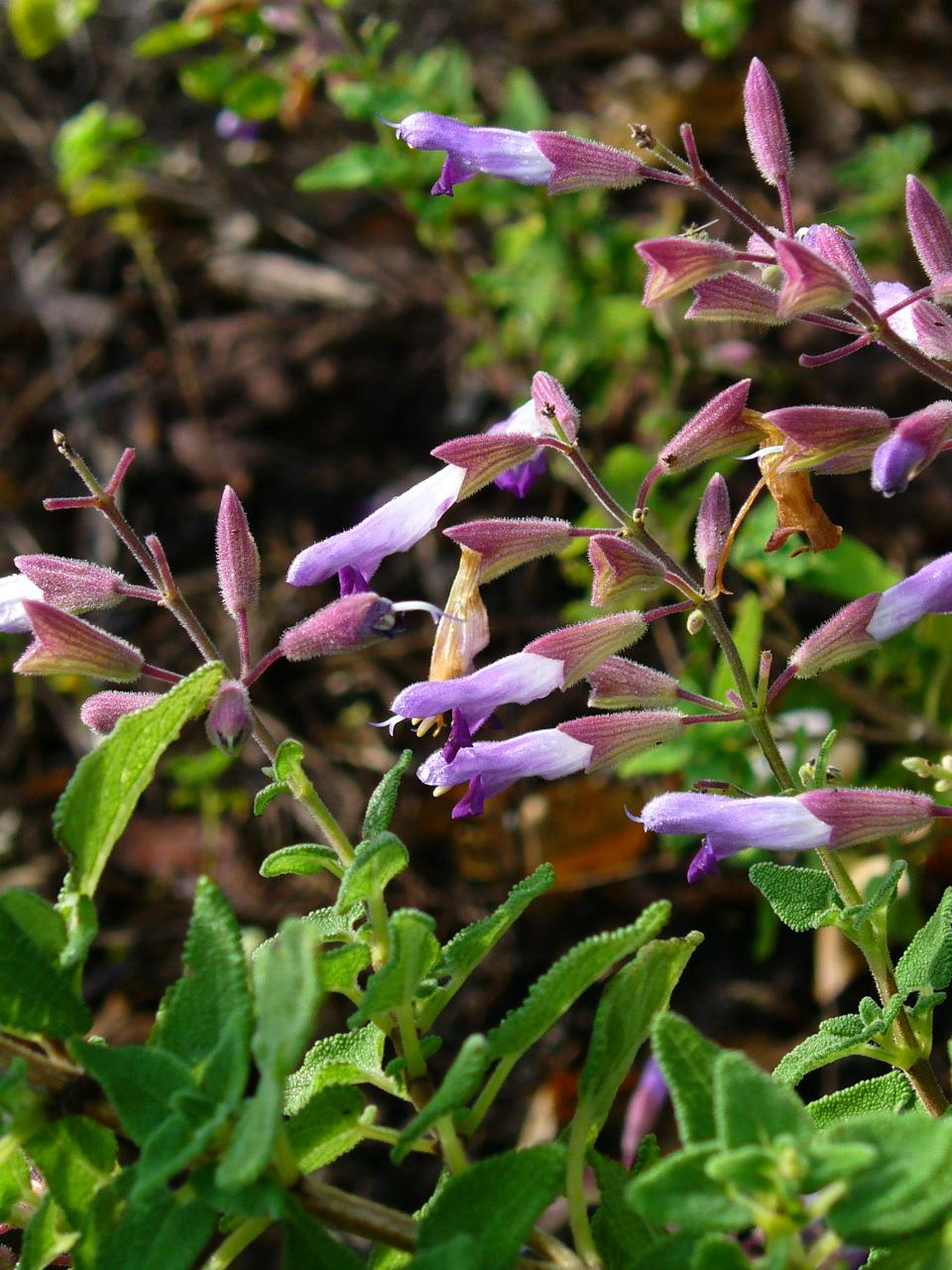

Scientific classification
- Kingdom: Plantae
- Clade: Tracheophytes
- Clade: Angiosperms
- Clade: Eudicots
- Clade: Asterids
- Order: Lamiales
- Family: Lamiaceae
- Genus: Salvia
- Species: S. semiatrata

Binomial name
- Salvia semiatrata Zucc.

= Salvia semiatrata =

Species of flowering plant

Salvia semiatrata is a species of perennial plant native to the Sierra Madre del Sur in the Mexican state of Oaxaca, growing at elevations of 6,500 ft (2,000 m) or higher. It prefers the edges of pine forests, and is also found on limestone cliffs and banks and in cactus scrub habitats that are dry and exposed.

Salvia semiatrata reaches 6 ft (1.8 m) high and 3 ft (0.91 m) wide in the wild and in ideal garden conditions. The 1 in (2.5 cm) deltoid leaves are a bright grassy green-yellow color, growing in small clusters even though they are opposite. The leaf surface is rugose, with the underside covered with short light cream-colored hairs that bring out the veining. The 6 in (15 cm) inflorescences have whorls of one to three flowers in each verticil. The flowers are 1 to 2 in (2.5 to 5.1 cm) long and bicolored; the upper lip is a luminous dark violet and covered with hairs, while the lower lip is a dusky lavender. The calyx is 0.5 in (1.3 cm) inches long and covered with hairs, and is a rich violet color with magenta. The specific epithet semiatra refers to the corolla tube and its two colors.
