= Nariyasu =

- Gender: Male

Origin
- Origin: Japanese
- Meaning: Different meanings depending on the kanji used

Nariyasu (written: 斉泰 or 成泰) is a masculine Japanese given name. Notable people with the name include:

- Maeda Nariyasu (前田 斉泰; 1811–1884), Japanese daimyō
- Nariyasu Yasuhara (安原 成泰; born 1968), Japanese footballer and manager
