= Flora Japonica =

Flora Japonica may refer to:

- Flora Japonica (1784 book), a book by Carl Peter Thunberg published in 1784
- Flora Japonica (1835 book), a book by Philipp Franz von Siebold and Joseph Gerhard Zuccarini published in 1835

== See also ==
- Flora of Japan
