= Toyama Domain =

Toyama Domain 富山藩
- under Tokugawa shogunate Japan
- 1639–1871
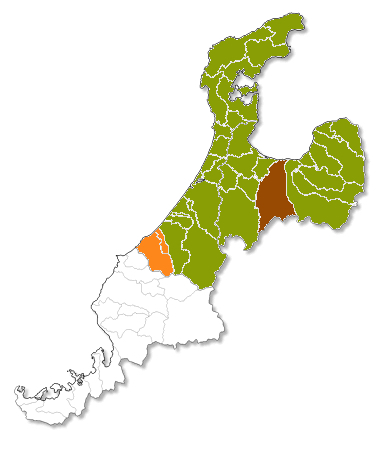
- Kaga Toyama and Daishōji han in late Edo period, Daishōji Domain in orange, Kaga Domain in green, Toyama Domain in brown
- Capital: Toyama Castle
- Area
  - Coordinates: 36.6933°N 137.211°E
- Government
  - Type: Daimyō
- Historical era: Edo period
  - Split from Kaga Domain: 1639
  - Disestablished: 1871
- Today part of: part of Ishikawa Prefecture

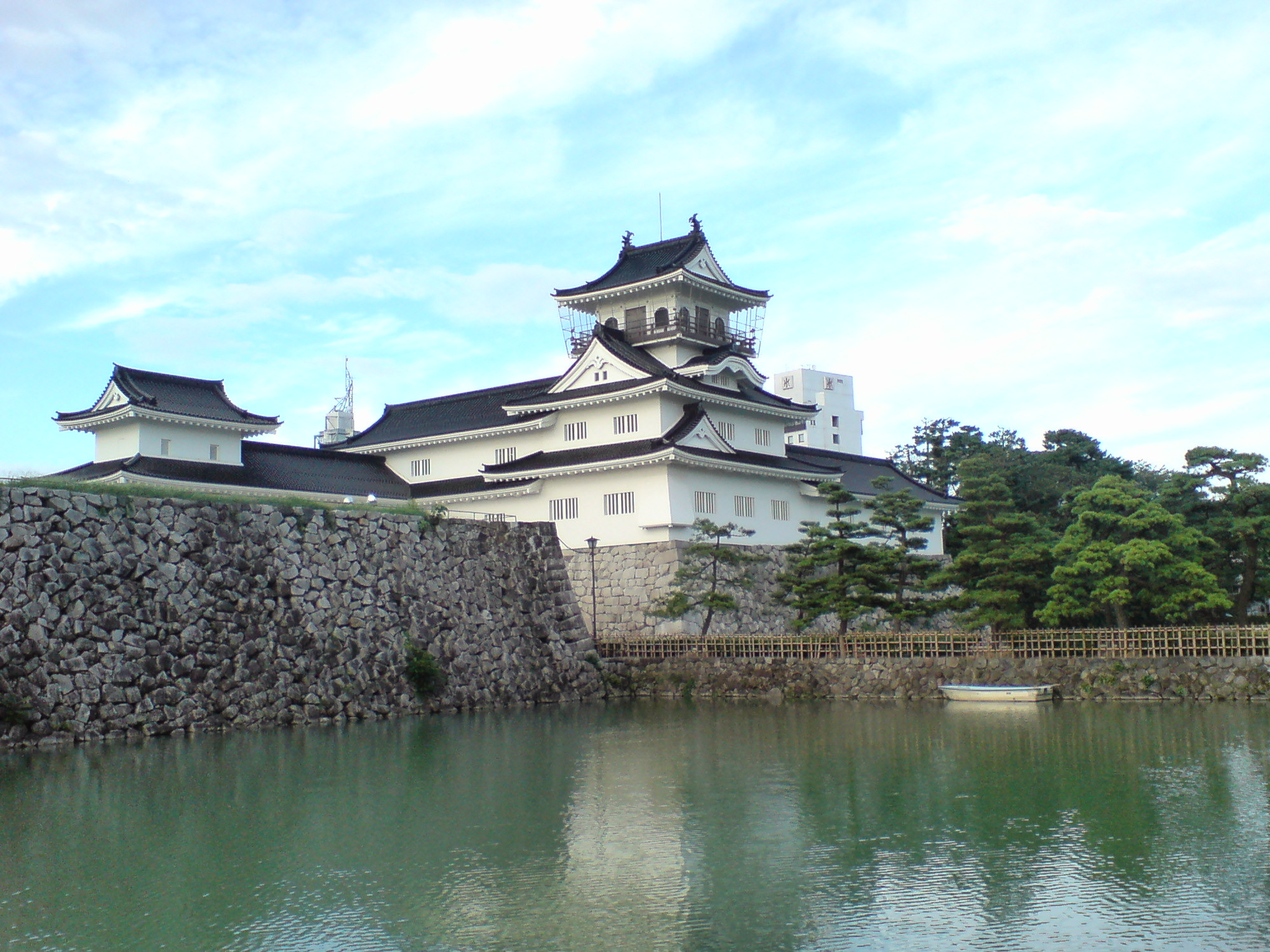
Toyama Castle

Toyama Domain (富山藩, Toyama han) was a feudal domain in Edo period Japan, located in Etchū Province (modern-day Toyama Prefecture), Japan. It was centered on Toyama Castle in what is now the city of Toyama. Throughout its history, it was ruled by a cadet branch of the Maeda clan. The daimyō of Toyama Domain was subject to sankin-kōtai, and was received in the Ōhiroma of Edo Castle.

== History ==
In 1639, the 3rd daimyō of Kaga Domain, Maeda Toshitsune, retired from office, and divided his domain among his three sons. Kaga Domain went to Maeda Mitsutaka; however, a 100,000 koku holding was created for his second son Maeda Toshitsugu (Toyama Domain), and a 70,000 koku holding for his third son Maeda Toshiharu (Daishōji Domain)

Initially, Toyama Domain consisted of several discontinuous areas: 60,000 koku in Nei District, 16,800 koku in Niikawa District (west bank of the Kurobe River, 3170 koku in seven villages around to town of Toyama and an exclave in Kaga Province of 20,000 koku in Nomi District. Although Maeda Toshitsugu moved into Toyama Castle in 1640, initially the castle itself remained part of Kaga Domain and he intended to construct a new castle in a different location within Nei District. However, he was unable to raise the funds for this endeavor and in 1659 reached an agreement with Kaga Domain to exchange the holdings in Niikawa District and the exclave in Kaga Province for Toyama Castle and the surrounding 27,000 koku of lands. In 1661, he received permission from the Tokugawa shogunate to rebuild the castle and to layout a new castle town.

With the development of new rice lands, by the Kyōhō era (1716-1735), the kokudaka of Toyama Province was assessed at 140,000 koku. The domain had several other sources of income, including fishing, the production of Traditional Chinese medicines, production of washi paper, and sericulture, which raised its actual kokudaka to over 200,000 koku. However, this did not mean that the domain was very prosperous, as its subordinate position to Kaga Domain meant that extra revenues were constantly being drained off to repay the debts of the parent domain. Also, Toyama was subject to frequent flooding and other natural disasters. In 1831, most of the town burned down in a fire, and in 1858 an earthquake followed by flooding again destroyed most of the town. The domain under Maeda Toshiatsu was forced to turn to Kaga Domain for financial assistance and to help suppress peasant revolts.

During the Boshin War of the Meiji restoration, the domain sided with the imperial forces, and supplied four companies of soldiers (158 men) in the Battle of Hokuetsu against Nagaoka Domain.

After the end of the conflict, with the abolition of the han system in July 1871, Toyama Domain became “Toyama Prefecture”, which merged with Ishikawa Prefecture in April 1876. It was separated back out as Toyama Prefecture in May 1883.

== Bakumatsu period holdings ==
As with most domains in the han system, Toyama Domain consisted of discontinuous territories calculated to provide the assigned kokudaka, based on periodic cadastral surveys and projected agricultural yields. At the end of the Tokugawa shogunate, the domain consisted of the following holdings:

- Etchū Province
  - 180 villages in Nomi District
  - 64 villages in Niikawa District

== List of daimyō ==
#	Name	Tenure	Courtesy title	Court Rank	kokudaka
Maeda clan (tozama) 1639-1871
1	Maeda Toshitsugu (前田利次)	1639-1674	Awa-no-kami (淡路守)	Junior 4th Rank, Lower Grade (従四位下)	100,000 koku
2	Maeda Masatoshi (前田正甫)	1674-1706	Ōkura-no-shoyu (大蔵少輔)	Junior 4th Rank, Lower Grade (従四位下)	100,000 koku
3	Maeda Toshioki (前田利興)	1706-1724	Nagato-no-kami (長門守)	Junior 4th Rank, Lower Grade (従四位下)	100,000 -> 140,000 koku
4	Maeda Toshitaka (前田利隆)	1724-1744	Izumo-no-kami (出雲守)	Junior 4th Rank, Lower Grade(従四位下)	140,000 koku
5	Maeda Toshiyuki (前田利幸)	1745-1762	Izumo-no-kami (出雲守)	Junior 5th Rank, Lower Grade (従五位下)	140,000 koku
6	Maeda Toshitomo (前田利與)	1762-1777	Awa-no-kami (淡路守)	Junior 4th Rank, Lower Grade (従四位下)	140,000 koku
7	Maeda Toshihisa (前田利久)	1777-1787	Nagato-no-kami (長門守)	Junior 4th Rank, Lower Grade (従四位下)	140,000 koku
8	Maeda Toshinori (前田利謙)	1787-1801	Izumo-no-kami (出雲守)	Junior 4th Rank, Lower Grade (従四位下)	140,000 koku
9	Maeda Toshitsuyo (前田利幹)	1801-1835	Izumo-no-kami (出雲守)	Junior 5th Rank, Lower Grade (従五位下)	140,000 koku
10	Maeda Toshiyasu (前田利保)	1835-1846	Izumo-no-kami (出雲守)	Junior 4th Rank, Lower Grade (従四位下)	140,000 koku
11	Maeda Toshitomo (前田利友)	1846-1853	Izumo-no-kami (出雲守)	Junior 4th Rank, Lower Grade (従四位下)	140,000 koku
12	Maeda Toshikata (前田利聲)	1854-1859	Ōkura-no-shoyu (大蔵少輔)	Junior 4th Rank, Lower Grade (従四位下)	140,000 koku
13	Maeda Toshiatsu (前田利同)	1859-1871	Awa-no-kami (淡路守)	Junior 4th Rank, Lower Grade (従四位下)	140,000 koku

=== Maeda Toshitsugu ===
Maeda Toshitsugu (前田 利次) (June 2, 1617 – August 8, 1674) the first daimyō of Toyama Domain. He was the second son of Maeda Toshitsune, the third daimyō of the Kaga Domain and was granted the courtesy title of chamberlain and Junior 4th Court Rank in his genpuku ceremony in 1631. In 1639, Maeda Toshitsune separated a 100,000 koku holding from Kaga Domain and elevated him to the status of daimyō. Although Toshitsugu moved into Toyama Castle in 1640, initially the castle itself remained part of Kaga Domain and he intended to construct a new castle in a different location within Nei District. However, he was unable to raise the funds for this endeavor and in 1659 reached an agreement with Kaga Domain to exchange his holdings in Niikawa District and an exclave in Kaga Province for Toyama Castle and the surrounding 27,000 koku of lands. In 1661, he received permission from the Tokugawa shogunate to rebuild the castle and to layout a new castle town. During his tenure, he was noted for promulgating the domain's legal code in 1644, and for his work on opening new rice lands, irrigation and flood control projects, and surveying the domain borders. He fell ill at Edo Castle in 1674, where he died; however, his body was conveyed back to Toyama Castle, where the peasantry were allowed to attend his funeral. Toshitsugu was married to a daughter of Torii Tadamasa, daimyō of Yamagata Domain.

=== Maeda Masatoshi ===
Maeda Masatoshi (前田 正甫) (September 8, 1649 – May 30, 1706) was the second daimyō of Toyama Domain. Masatoshi was the second son of Maeda Toshitsugu and became daimyō on the death of his father in 1674. Although he continued the public works projects begun by his father, the domain faced financial problems as much of the best farmland in the area remained under the control of Kaga Domain, which also raided the treasury of Toyama Domain whenever it needed funds. He attempted to start new industries, including the selling of Traditional Chinese medicines, for which Toyama later became famous. In 1681, he was called upon to send his forces to Takada Domain in Echigo Province to enforce the attainder of that domain. He died in 1706 at the age of 58. His wife was a daughter of Nakagawa Hisakiyo of Oka Domain.

=== Maeda Toshioki ===
Maeda Toshioki (前田 利興) (July 15, 1678 – June 30, 1733) was the third daimyō of Toyama Domain. Toshioki was born in Toyama as the second son of Maeda Masatoshi, and inherited the domain and its problems on his father's death in 1706. Financial problems forced him to lay off 60 retainers, to become more severe in tax collection and to pass sumptuary laws. He also taxed tobacco and soy sauce in an effort to raise more funds. However, the Tokugawa shogunate made matters worse by assigning the reconstruction of the temple of Zōjō-ji in Edo to Toyama Domain in 1713. In 1714, Toyama Castle burned down and in 1723 rebuilding of its ramparts cost the domain 17,000 koku in revenues. He retired in 1724 and died in 1733 at the age of 56. Toshioki's wife was a daughter of Maeda Toshinao of Daishōji Domain.

=== Maeda Toshitaka ===
Maeda Toshitaka (前田 利隆) (December 11, 1690 – January 22, 1745) was the fourth daimyō of Toyama Domain. Toshitaka was born in Kanazawa as the 5th son of Maeda Masatoshi. He became daimyō when his brother retired in 1724. He was able to do little to affect the fiscal situation of the domain. He died in 1744 at the age of 56.

=== Maeda Toshiyuki ===
Maeda Toshiyuki (前田 利幸) (January 29, 1730 – October 20, 1762) was the fifth daimyō of Toyama Domain. Toshiyuki was born in Toyama as the eldest son of Maeda Toshitaka. He became daimyō in 1745, a couple of months after his father's death. In order to rectify the domain's finances, he encouraged the formation of the kabunakama system, with price controls and 15-year extensions on the repayment of loans, all to no avail. He died in 1764 at the age of 34. His wife was a daughter of Maeda Toshinori of Kaga Domain.

=== Maeda Toshitomo ===
Maeda Toshitomo (前田 利與) (November 11, 1737 – September 15, 1794) was the sixth daimyō of Toyama Domain. Toshitomo was the fourth son of Maeda Toshitaka, and was born in Toyama. In 1762, on the sudden death of his brother, Maeda Toshiyuki, he became interim daimyō as Toshiyuki's son, Maeda Toshihisa, was still an infant. In 1763, the Tokugawa shogunate assigned Toyama Domain the task of repairs of the Nikkō Tōshō-gū. The expense came to over 110,000 ryō. In 1771, the shogunate again called on Toyama Domain, this time to dispatch troops to Hida Province to suppress a revolt. In 1775, the domain was called upon to repair dikes for flood control in Kai Province, and again in Mino Province in 1788. These demands from the shogunate caused the domain to default on its loans, and it was forced to lay off hundreds of its samurai. In 1773, a han school was established. Toshitomo retired in 1777 and died in 1794 at the age of 58. His wife was a daughter of Maeda Toshnao of Daishōji Domain.

=== Maeda Toshihisa ===
Maeda Toshihisa (前田 利謙) (April 10, 1762 – September 18, 1787) was the seventh daimyō of Toyama Domain. Toshihisa was born in Toyama as the eldest son of Maeda Toshiyuki. He was an infant when his father died in 1762, so his uncle, Maeda Toshitomo, became daimyō instead. He was adopted as Toshitomo's heir in 1763 and became daimyō on Toshitomo's retirement in 1777. He died in 1787 at the age of 26 with an uneventful tenure.

=== Maeda Toshinori ===
Maeda Toshinori (前田 利謙) (December 22, 1768 – October 3, 1801) was the eighth daimyō of Toyama Domain. Toshinori was born in Edo as the eldest son of Maeda Toshitomo. He was adopted by Maeda Toshihisa as heir, and after Toshihisa's sudden death a few months later, he was made daimyō. In 1788, the domain was called upon by the Tokugawa shogunate to repair dikes and flood control projects in Mino Province, which the domain could ill afford. He died in 1801 at the age of 35. Toshinori's wife was a daughter of Mōri Shigenari of Chōshū Domain.

=== Maeda Toshitsuyo ===
Maeda Toshitsuyo (前田 利幹; January 2, 1772 – August 31, 1836) was the ninth daimyō of Toyama Domain. Toshitsuyo was born in Edo as the eighth son of Maeda Toshimichii of Daishōji Domain. As Maeda Toshinori died in 1801 leaving a two-year-old son, Toshitsuyo was selected by the Maeda clan to become daimyō. In an effort to rectify the domain's perennial financial problems, he pushed for the development of new rice lands, new monopolies and increased taxes; however, inflation together with these financial measures resulted in a peasant revolt in 1813. In 1831, the castle town of Toyama was largely destroyed by a fire. The domain issued paper currency in 1833. The same year, he annoused a five-year plan for restructuring the clan's finances, and invited a merchant from Osaka, Ishida Kozaemon to Toyama as his financial advisor. Ishida had a record of successfully restructuring the finances of ten other domains and several institutions, such as the Nishi Hongan-ji temple in Kyoto and was initially received in Toyoma with enthusiasm; however, towards the end of stipulated period, the domain's situation was even worse off than before. However, Maeda Toshitsuyo died in 1836 at the age of 66.

=== Maeda Toshiyasu ===
Maeda Toshiyasu (前田 利保; March 23, 1800 – September 14, 1859) was the tenth daimyō of Toyama Domain. He was born in Edo as the second son of Maeda Toshinori, but was still underage on his father's death, so the domain was assigned to Maeda Toshitsuyo instead. In 1811, he was adopted by Toshitsuyo to restore the line of succession and became daimyō in 1835 when Toshitsuyo retired due to illness. On taking office, the domain was hit hard by a crop failure, which continued through 1838 as part of the Tenpō famine. The domain defaulted on all its debts, and was forced to take a 30,000 ryō loan from the shogunate in 1838, followed by an additional 25,000 ryō the following year. In 1841, the domain reported that it did not have the funds to make its required sankin kōtai to Edo. In 1846, citing ill heath, Toshiyasu went into retirement in favor of his sixth son, Maeda Toshitomo. His wife was a daughter of Asano Narikata of Hiroshima Domain. Toshiyasu was also a noted naturalist and entomologist. He organized a society of like-minded officials to meet monthly to discuss a specific topic, and studied Dutch and French to better understand Siebold's Fauna Japonica and Flora Japonica). He also translated the Systema Naturae from Dutch into Japanese.

=== Maeda Toshitomo ===
Maeda Toshitomo (前田 利友; March 10, 1834 – January 18, 1854) was the eleventh daimyō of Toyama Domain. Toshitomo was born in Edo as the sixth son of Maeda Toshiyasu. He became daimyō on his father's retirement in 1846. He was only 12 years old at the time and was in poor health, so all governance was left in the hands of his parents and senior retainers. This led to a conflict between the retainers based in Edo and those remaining in Toyama, which erupted in an O-Ie Sōdō on his death in 1854 at the age of 20.

=== Maeda Toshikata ===
Maeda Toshikata (前田 利聲; March 15, 1835 – February 16, 1904) was the twelfth daimyō of Toyama Domain. Toshikata was born in Edo as the seventh son of Maeda Toshiyasu. In December 1853, he was adopted by his sickly brother as heir and became daimyō on his brother's death a few months later. The domain continued to be plagued by crop failures, fiscal insolvency and a political issue between domain retainers based in Toyama and those based in Edo. The situation peaked in 1857 when Maeda Nariyasu of Kaga Domain was forced to step in to resolve the conflict, which he did by largely firing the members of the Edo faction. Toshikata was also sidelined, allegedly for poor health in 1857 and his father ruled from behind-the-scenes for the next two years. In 1858, the domain suffered from the 1858 Hietsu earthquake, which severely damaged Toyama Castle and the surrounding caste town, and a landslide blocked the flow of the Jōganji River for two weeks, until the dam burst causing great damage and loss of life. Toshikata retired shortly afterwards and Toyama Domain came under the direct supervision of Kaga Domain. Toshikata's grave is at the temple of Emmei-in in Arakawa, Tokyo.

=== Maeda Toshiatsu ===
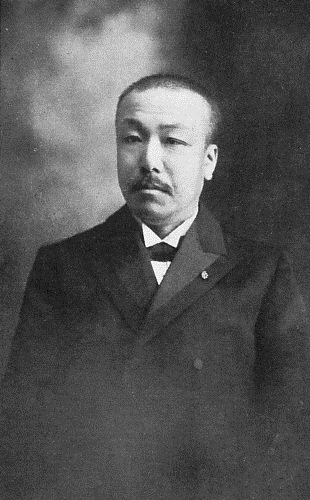
Count Maeda Toshiatsu

Count Maeda Toshiatsu (前田 利同; July 28, 1856 – December 23, 1921) was the thirteenth (and final) daimyō of Toyama Domain. Toshiatsu was born in Edo as the 11th son of Maeda Nariyasu of Kaga Domain in 1859. He was selected to be daimyō on the forced retirement of Maeda Toshikata. However, Toshiatsu was only three years old at the time, therefore Toyama came effectively under the direct control of Kaga Domain. From 1869 until the abolition of the han system he was appointed imperial governor of Toyama, and afterwards relocated to Tokyo. From October Meiji 4 to December Meiji 6 he studied in Paris, and visited London before returning to Japan. From April 1882 he served in the Foreign Ministry as secretary on French affairs and later served in the Imperial Household Ministry. In 1884, he was elevated to hakushaku (count) in the kazoku peerage system. He died of a cerebral hemorrhage in 1921 at his home in Shitaya, Tokyo at the age of 66. He was awarded 2nd Court Rank on his death. His wife was a daughter of Matsudaira Terutoshi of Takasaki Domain. His grave is at the temple of Gokoku-ji in Tokyo.

The title passed to his adopted son, Count Maeda Toshio (前田 利男; November 4, 1886 – December 29, 1966). He was born as the 5th son of Mizoguchi Naomasa, daimyō of Shibata Domain. A graduate of the Faculty of Agriculture of Tokyo Imperial University in 1913, he served as a secretary to the Prime Minister of Japan and adjutant to Prince Chichibu He became Count on his father's death in 1922 and served as a member of the House of Peers. He was succeeded by his son, Maeda Toshinobu (前田 利信), and grandson Maeda Akitoshi (前田章利).
