= Zuccarinia =

Scientific classification
- Kingdom: Plantae
- Clade: Tracheophytes
- Clade: Angiosperms
- Clade: Eudicots
- Clade: Asterids
- Order: Gentianales
- Family: Rubiaceae
- Genus: Zuccarinia; Blume
- Species: Z. macrophylla

Binomial name
- Zuccarinia macrophylla Blume

Genus of plants

Zuccarinia is a monotypic genus of flowering plants in the family of Rubiaceae. The genus contains only one species, i.e. Zuccarinia macrophylla, which is endemic to western Malesia, It is found in Jawa, Malaya and Sumatera.

The genus and species were circumscribed by Carl Ludwig Blume in Bijdr. Fl. Ned. Ind. on pages 1006-1007 in 1826.

The genus name of Zuccarinia is in honour of Joseph Gerhard Zuccarini (1797–1848), who was a German botanist, Professor of Botany at LMU Munich.

== Former species ==
- Zuccarinia cordata Ridl. = Zuccarinia macrophylla Blume
- Zuccarinia ornata (Wall.) Spreng. = Jackiopsis ornata (Wall.) Ridsdale
