= Maeda Tsunanori =

Japanese samurai and feudal lord

- 前田 綱紀
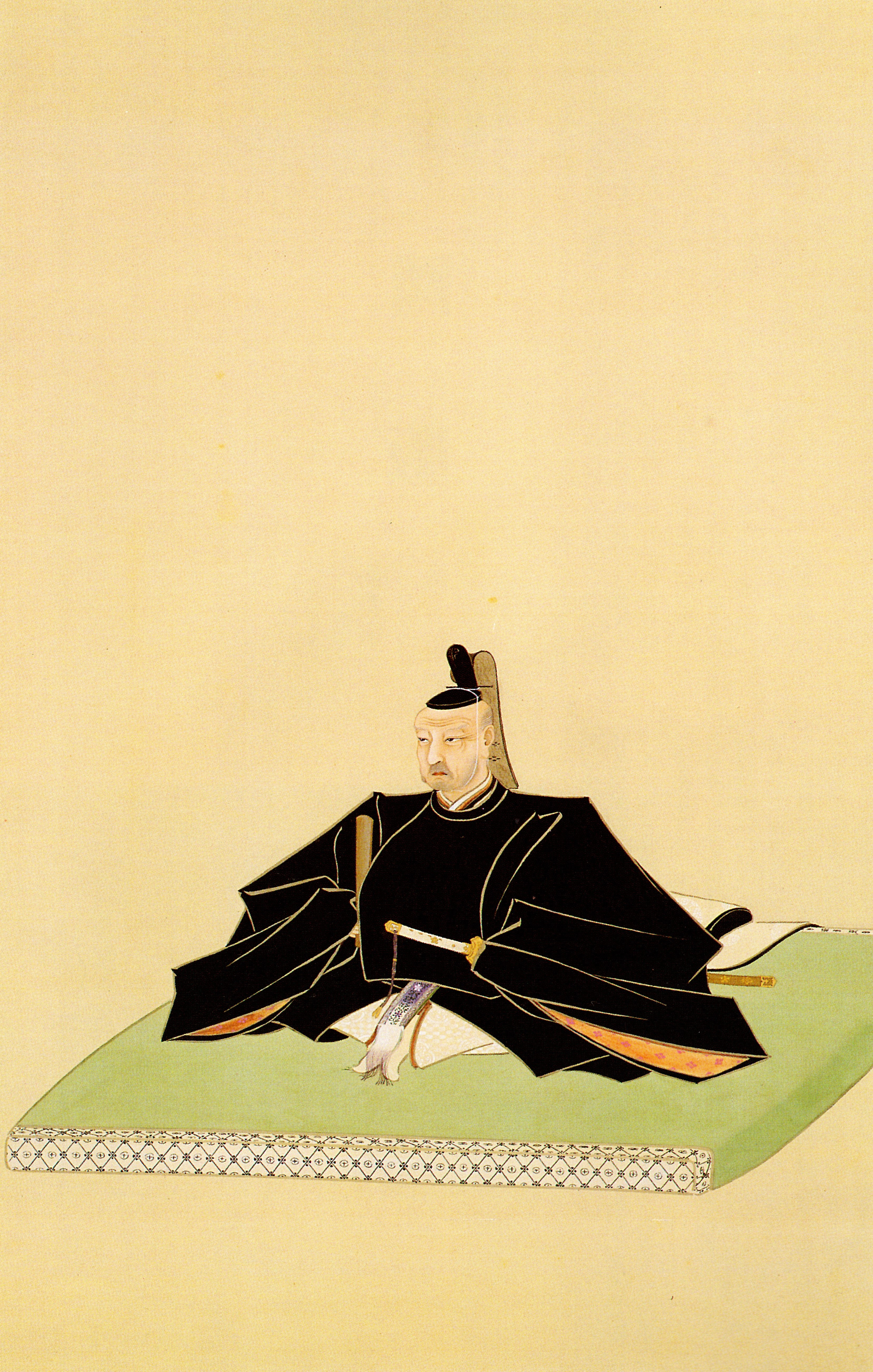

4th Daimyō of Kaga Domain
- In office 1645–1723
- Preceded by: Maeda Mitsutaka
- Succeeded by: Maeda Yoshinori

Personal details
- Born: December 26, 1643 Edo, Japan
- Died: June 29, 1724 (aged 80)
- Resting place: Nodayama Cemetery, Kanazawa, Japan
- Spouse: Daughter of Hoshina Masayuki
- Domestic partner: 7 concubines
- Children: 6 sons, 6 daughters, 3 adopted daughters
- Parent: Maeda Mitsutaka (father)

Maeda Tsunanori (前田 綱紀; December 26, 1643 – June 29, 1724) was an Edo period Japanese samurai, and the 4th daimyō of Kaga Domain in the Hokuriku region of Japan. He was the 5th hereditary chieftain of the Kanazawa Maeda clan. His childhood name was "Inuchiyo" (犬千代).

== Biography ==
Tsunanori was born at the Maeda clan residence in Edo as the eldest son of Maeda Mitsutaka. His mother was the daughter of Tokugawa Yorifusa of Mito Domain. Mitsutaka died in 1645 at the age of 29, leaving the domain in the hands of his 2-year-old son, and by order of the Tokugawa shogunate, Tsunanori's grandfather, Maeda Toshitsune was named regent.

Tsunanori was called Matsudaira Inuchiyo-maru in his youth, He underwent the genpuku ceremony (a coming-of-age ceremony) in 1654, with Shōgun Tokugawa Ietsuna presiding and was awarded Senior 4th Rank, lower grade and the courtesy title of Sakonoe-shosho and Kaga-no-kami at that time.

In 1658, he was wed to Suma-hime (also known as Matsu-hime), the daughter of Hoshina Masayuki of Aizu Domain. However, this was a political marriage; she was only 10 years old, and died in 1666 at the age of 18. Tsunanori never formally remarried.

Also in 1658, Toshitsune died, and Tsunanori was finally able to take full control of the domain at the age of 15. One of his first steps was to initiate a land reform program grouping villages into groups of ten in order to facilitate tax collection and opening of new rice lands. He also established a more systematic approach to famine relief and to medical care within the domain. He revised the domain laws which had been very severe since the time of Maeda Toshiie's suppression of the Ikkō-ikki. Tsunanori also settled a long-simmering border dispute with Fukui Domain over who "owned" the holy mountain of Hakusan on the border of the two provinces.

Tsunanori was also a noted patron of the arts, especially favoring the performance of Noh plays in the domain. He also amassed major collection of Japanese and Chinese literary works. However, he is perhaps best known for his development of the famous Kenroku-en gardens in Kanazawa.

In 1689, under Shōgun Tokugawa Tsunayoshi, the domain was accorded the same courtesy in audiences in Edo Castle as was extended to the Gosanke, and the kokudaka of the domain was reassessed at 1 million koku.

Tsunanori retired from public life in 1723 and died in 1724 at the age of 80.

== Family ==
- Father: Maeda Mitsutaka
- Mother: Tokugawa Ōhime (1627-1665), daughter of Tokugawa Yorinobu of Wakayama Domain
- Wife: Matsuhime (1648-1666)
- Concubines:
  - Omiyo no Kata
  - Juen’in
  - Chosho-in
  - Hojuin
  - Omachi no Kata
  - Horin’in
  - Okoshi no Kata
- Children:
  - Maeda Toshikiyo (1674-1675) by Omiyo no Kata
  - Senhime (1677-1681) by Juen’in
  - Ushihime (1680-1730) married Asano Yoshinaga by Juen’in
  - Reishoin (1677-1677) by Chosho-in
  - Toyohime (1687-1718) married Maeda Takasuke by Hojuin
  - Keihime (1689-1737) married Ikeda Yoshiyasu by Hojuin
  - Maeda Toshiakira (1691 – 1737) by Hojuin
  - Naohime (1693-1749) married Nijō Yoshitada by Hojuin
  - Yoshihime (1689-1693) by Omachi no Kata
  - Maeda Yoshinori by Omachi no Kata
  - Kumaru (1689-1689) by Horin’in
  - Masajuro (1698-1699) by Okoshi no Kata
- Adopted Daughters:
  - Kyohime married Cho Hisatsura
  - Seihime married Sanjonishi Ginfuku
  - Utsuhime married Sakai tadayori

== Honors ==
- 1654: Senior 4th Grade, lower rank and Sakonoe-shosho
- 1658: Sakonoe-chusho
- 1693: Sangi
- 1707: Senior Third Grade
- 1723: Hizen-no-kami
- 1909: Second Grade (posthumous)

Preceded by Maeda Mitsutaka	4th (Maeda) daimyō of Kaga; 1645–1723	Succeeded by Maeda Yoshinori
