= Maeda Nagatane =

Japanese samurai

Maeda Nagatane (前田 長種, 1550 – April 12, 1631) was a Japanese samurai of the Azuchi-Momoyama period through early Edo period. He served the Maeda clan of Kaga as one of its senior retainers. He married Ko, daughter of Maeda Toshiie.

His court title was Tsushima no kami.
