= Maeda Yoshiyasu =

Japanese samurai

- 前田 慶寧

Daimyō of Kaga Domain
- In office 1866–1871
- Preceded by: Maeda Nariyasu
- Succeeded by: None

Personal details
- Born: June 24, 1830 Edo, Japan
- Died: May 22, 1874 (aged 43) Atami, Shizuoka, Japan
- Spouse: Daughter of Arima Yorinori of Kurume Domain
- Domestic partner: Daughter of Takatsukasa Masamichi
- Parent: Maeda Nariyasu (father)

Maeda Yoshiyasu (前田 慶寧; June 24, 1830 – May 22, 1874) was a late-Edo period Japanese samurai, and the 13th (and final) daimyō of Kaga Domain in the Hokuriku region of Japan, and the 14th hereditary lord of the Maeda clan.

Yoshiyasu was born in Edo as Inuchiyo (犬千代), the first son of Maeda Nariyasu. His mother was Yō-hime, the daughter of Shōgun Tokugawa Ienari. In 1842, he was presented to the Shōgun Tokugawa Ieyoshi in formal audience, who a week later presided over his genpuku ceremony. At that time, his name was changed from Toshizumi (利住) to Yoshiyasu.

In May 1864 he was sent to Kyoto in Nariyasu's place as leader of the Kaga samurai assigned to guard the Imperial Palace, however due to his poor health he preferred to stay at a small Kaga exclave located in Omi Province, far from the danger. While there, he unsuccessfully attempted mediate between the Chōshū samurai and the forces of the Tokugawa shogunate at the time of the Kinmon incident. This opened Kaga Domain to a charge of collusion with enemies of the state, and an alarmed Nariyasu had Yohsiyasu sent back to Kanazawa under house arrest, which lasted until April 1865.

On April 4, 1866, on the retirement of his father, he became daimyō of Kaga Domain; however, he was only a figurehead as his father continued to control all power. Kaga Domain joined the imperial cause in the Boshin War, and Yoshiyasu was appointed Imperial Governor of Kanazawa in June 1869. His court rank was increased to Senior Third Rank a month later. After the abolition of the han system in July 1871, he relocated to Tokyo. Shortly afterwards, he developed tuberculosis, and died at Atami on May 22, 1874, at the age of 43. He was posthumously elevated to Senior Second Rank in 1893.

== Family ==
- Father: Maeda Nariyasu (1811–1884)
- Mother: Yō-hime, 12th daughter of Tokugawa Ienari (1813–1868)
- Wives:
  - Takahime, daughter of Arima Yorinori (1832-1856)
  - Nori-hime, adopted daughter of Takatsukasa Masamichi (1846-1864)
- Concubine:
  - Ofude no Kata
  - Orisa no Kata
  - Ouji no Kata
- Children:
  - Yasuko (1864-1923) married Prince Arisugawa Takehito by Ofude no Kata
  - Maeda Toshitsugu (1858-1900) by Ofude no Kata
  - Michiko (1854-1899) betrothed to Matsudaira Katamori later married Sakakibara Masataka by Ofude no Kata
  - Tomohime (1856-1857) by Ofude no Kata
  - Hiroko (1869-1891) married Konoe Atsumaro by Ofude no Kata
  - Utsuhime (1862-1873) by Orisa no Kata
  - Sadako (1871-1955) married Konoe Atsumaro by Ouji no Kata

== Ancestry ==
Ancestors of Maeda Yoshiyasu

16. Maeda Yoshinori
8. Maeda Shigemichi
17. Jitsujoin
4. Maeda Narinaga
9. Tenrin’in
2. Maeda Nariyasu
5. Oyae no Kata
1. Maeda Yoshiyasu
24. Tokugawa Munetada
12. Tokugawa Harusada (1751–1827)
25. Hosoda (Oyuka no Kata)
6. Tokugawa Ienari
26. Iwamoto Masatoshi
13. Otomi no Kata (d. 1817)
3. Tokugawa Yōhime (1813–1868)
28. Tokugawa Ieshige
14. Tokugawa Ieharu
29. Shinshin'in (d. 1748)
7. Omiyo no Kata (1797–1872)

Preceded by Maeda Nariyasu	13th (Maeda) daimyō of Kaga; 1866–1871	Succeeded by none
