= Maeda Toshitsune =

Japanese samurai of the Edo period

- 前田 利常
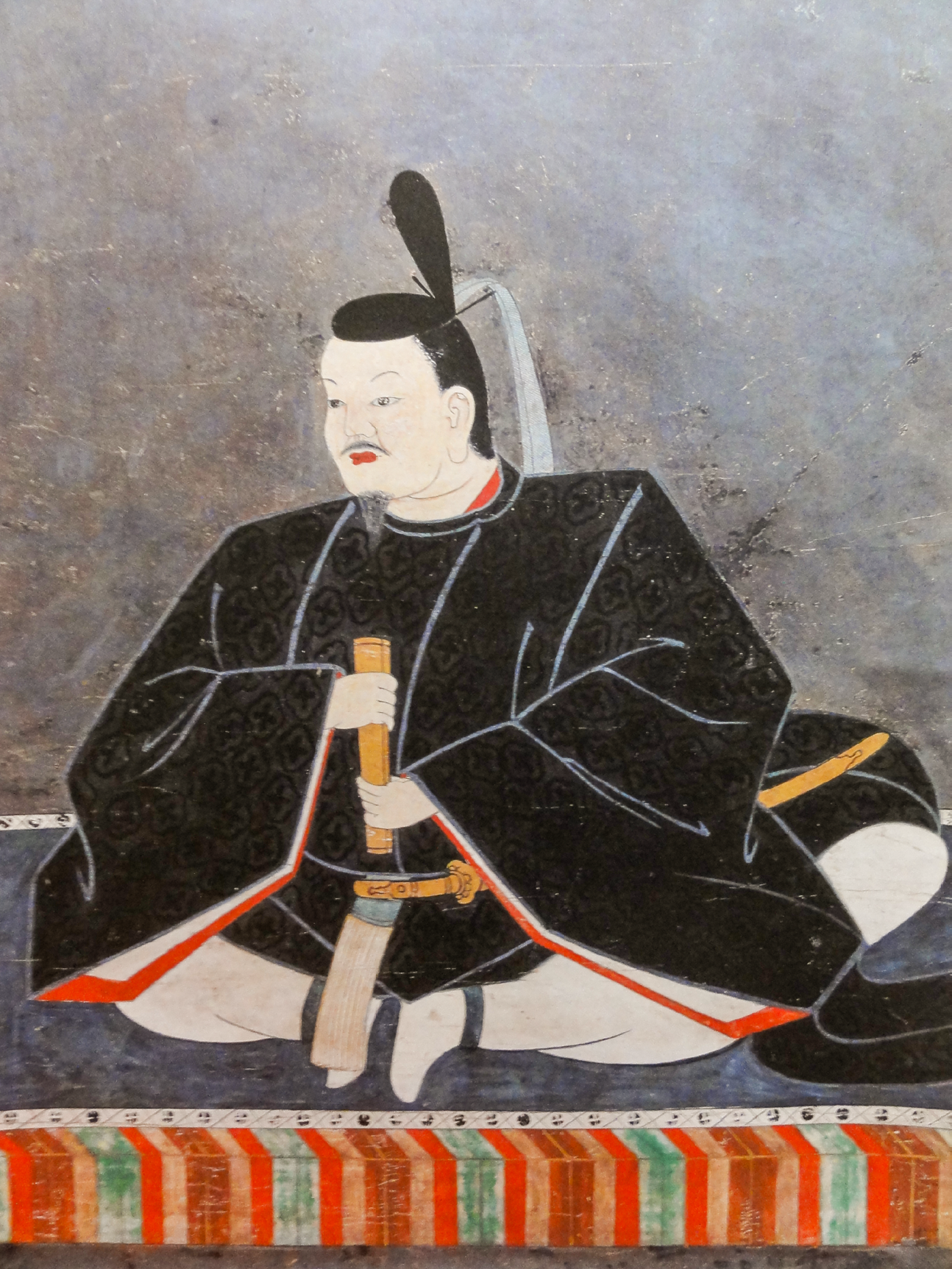

Lord of Kaga
- In office 1605–1639
- Preceded by: Maeda Toshinaga
- Succeeded by: Maeda Mitsutaka

Personal details
- Born: January 16, 1594
- Died: November 7, 1658 (aged 64)
- Children: Maeda Mitsutaka
- Parent: Maeda Toshiie (father)

Military service
- Allegiance: Tokugawa shogunate
- Unit: Maeda clan
- Battles/wars: Siege of Osaka

Maeda Toshitsune (前田 利常; January 16, 1594 – November 7, 1658) was an early-Edo period Japanese samurai, and the 2nd daimyō of Kaga Domain in the Hokuriku region of Japan, and the 3rd hereditary chieftain of the Maeda clan. Toshitsune was a brother of Maeda Toshinaga and a son of Maeda Toshiie. He was the wealthiest daimyō within the Tokugawa shogunate, and his domain encompassed Etchū, Kaga, and Noto provinces. His childhood name was Saruchiyo (猿千代) later "Inuchiyo" (犬千代).

Toshitsune was the fourth son of Maeda Toshiie, and was born to a concubine when Toshiie was aged 54 and was on campaign with Toyotomi Hideyoshi at Nagoya Castle during the Japanese invasion of Korea. He was largely raised by a retainer, Maeda Nagatane and was initially called Toshimitsu (利光).

In 1600 he married Tama-hime, a daughter of Tokugawa Hidetada in a political marriage intended to secure the position of the Maeda clan with the growing power of the Tokugawa. In 1605, his elder brother Maeda Toshinaga officially retired, and appointed Toshitsune as his heir and daimyō of Kaga Domain; however, Toshinaga continued to control the domain until his death.

In 1614 and 1615, Toshitsune led the Maeda army at the Siege of Osaka, forming one of the largest components of the Tokugawa forces. After the final defeat of the Toyotomi clan, Tokugawa Ieyasu offered the Maeda clan the four provinces of Shikoku island in exchange for their existing three provinces in the Hokuriku region, but Toshitsune declined.

In 1616, Toshitsune met with a diplomatic mission from Ayutthaya in Kanazawa, which due to the death of Tokugawa Ieyasu was not allowed to continue on to Edo.

He changed his name to Toshitsune in 1629. As Toshitsune, daimyō Toshitsune worked to allay fears by the Tokugawa shogunate of Kaga Domain's size and economic strength. He kept his son and heir Maeda Mitsutaka in Edo as a potential hostage, and arranged a political marriage of his son to a daughter of Tokugawa Yorinobu of Mito Domain. He retired in 1639, relocating to Komatsu and ordered that the domain be divided, with 100,000 koku going to his younger son Maeda Toshitsugu to form Toyama Domain, 70,000 koku going go his third son, Maeda Toshiharu to form Daishōji Domain, and 200,000 koku to support his own retirement. He died in 1658 at the age of 64, and his grave is at the Maeda cemetery at Nodayama in Kanazawa.

== Family ==
- Father: Maeda Toshiie (1539–1599)
- Mother: Kinsein
- Adoptive father: Maeda Toshinaga
- Wife: Tokugawa Tamahime (1599–1622), daughter of Tokugawa Hidetada and Azai Oeyo
  - First daughter: Kametsuruhime (1613–1630) married Mori Tadahiro
  - First son: Maeda Mitsutaka (1616–1645)
  - Second daughter: Kohime (1616–1617)
  - Second son: Maeda Toshitsugu (1617–1674)
  - Third son: Maeda Toshiharu (1618–1660)
  - Third daughter: Manhime (1620–1700) married Asano Mitsuakira
  - Fourth daughter: Fuhime (1621–1662) married Prince Hachijō Toshitada
  - Fifth daughter: Natsuhime (1622–1623)
- Concubine: Okowa no Kata
  - Sixth daughter: Haruhime (1631–1650) married Honda Masanaga
- Concubine: Okuri no Kata, Chō Tsuratatsu's daughter
  - Fifth son: Maeda Toshiaki (1638–1692)
- Concubine: Gojo-no-Tsubone
  - Seventh daughter: Matsuhime (1648–1666) married Matsudaira Sadashige
  - Eighth daughter: Ryuhime (1650–1654)
- Concubine: Kyogoku no kata
  - Seventh son: Ryumaru (1648–1651)
- Concubine: Fukusho-in
  - Ninth daughter: Kumahime (1652–1715) married Hoshina Masatsune

Preceded by Maeda Toshinaga	2nd (Maeda) daimyō of Kaga (Maeda); 1605–1639	Succeeded by Maeda Mitsutaka
