= Joseph Gerhard Zuccarini =

German botanist

- Born: 10 August 1797; Munich
- Died: 18 February 1848 (aged 50); Munich
- Known for: Flora Japonica (with Philipp Franz von Siebold), botanical descriptions of plants from Japan and Mexico
- Scientific career
- Fields: Botany
- Workplaces: Ludwig-Maximilians-Universität München
- Author abbrev. (botany): Zucc.

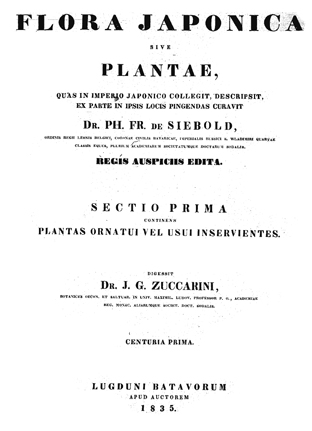
Title page of Flora Japonica by Philipp Franz von Siebold and Joseph Gerhard Zuccarini

Joseph Gerhard Zuccarini (10 August 1797 – 18 February 1848) was a German botanist, Professor of Botany at the Ludwig-Maximilians-Universität München. He worked extensively with Philipp Franz von Siebold (assisting in describing the latter's collections from Japan), and his own work that identified plants in other areas, including Mexico. Siebold wrote his Flora Japonica in collaboration with Zuccarini. Seibold's death interrupted completion of the work that first appeared in 1835, finished in 1870 by F. A. W. Miquel (1811–1871), director of the Rijksherbarium in Leiden.

Zuccarini is commemorated by the botanical genus Zuccarinia (Rubiaceae), identified by Carl Ludwig Blume in 1827.

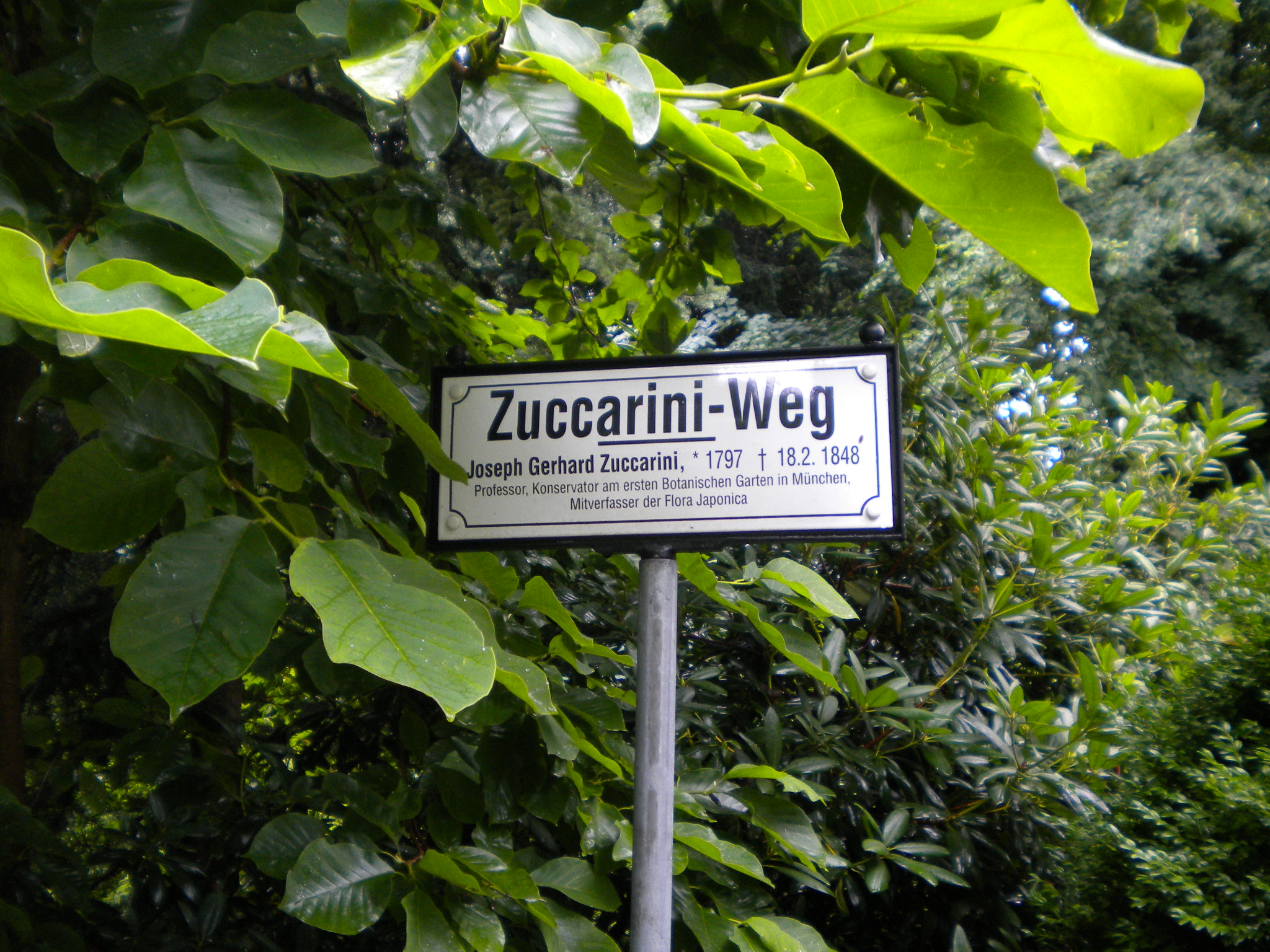
Joseph Gerhard Zuccarini signage in the botanical garden of Munich

The standard author abbreviation Zucc. is used to indicate this person as the author when citing a botanical name.
