= Maeda Mitsutaka =

Japanese daimyo of the Edo period (1616–1645)

- 前田 光高

3rd Daimyō of Kaga Domain
- In office 1639–1645
- Preceded by: Maeda Toshitsune
- Succeeded by: Maeda Tsunanori

Personal details
- Born: January 9, 1616
- Died: April 30, 1645 (aged 29) Edo, Japan
- Resting place: Kanazawa, Japan
- Spouse: Daughter of Tokugawa Yorinobu
- Children: Maeda Tsunanori
- Parents: Maeda Toshitsune (father); Daughter of Tokugawa Hidetada (mother)

Maeda Mitsutaka (前田 光高; January 9, 1616 – April 30, 1645) was an early-Edo period Japanese samurai, and the 3rd daimyō of Kaga Domain in the Hokuriku region of Japan. He was the 4th hereditary chieftain of the Kanazawa Maeda clan. His courtesy titles were Chikuzen-no-kami and Sakonoe-shosho. His childhood name was "Inuchiyo" (犬千代).

Mitsutaka was the eldest son of Maeda Toshitsune and his mother was Tamahime, the daughter of Shōgun Tokugawa Hidetada. His infant name was Inuchiyo and his childhood name was Toshitaka, In 1629, he underwent the genpuku ceremony presided over by his uncle, Tokugawa Iemitsu, and was allowed to adopt the Matsudaira patronym as an honorific and was given one kanji from Iemitsu's name, thus becoming "Mitsutaka". The Tokugawa clan and the Maeda clan attempted to maintain close relations though political intermarriage during this period, and Mitsutaka was married to Ōhime, the daughter of Tokugawa Yorinobu of Mito Domain.

In 1639, Toshitsune retired, dividing Kaga Domain between his three eldest sons. Mitsutaka's portion came to a kokudaka of 800,000 koku, which was the lowest in Kaga Domain's history, but still larger than any other domain within the Tokugawa shogunate. A well-known story is that Mitsutaka received word of the birth of his son, Tsunanori just as he was departing Kanazawa for the return journey to Edo for his sankin kōtai obligation and became so excited that the party rushed back to Edo in a record seven days from Kanazawa.

Mitsutaka was also accomplished in the martial arts, and was also known for his knowledge of both Japanese and Chinese literature. He was also regarded for his appearance, and became a favorite of Tokugawa Iemitsu. For a time, before Iemitsu had conceived an heir, Mitsutaka was considered a potential candidate to be adopted by Iemitsu to inherit the office of shōgun.

In 1645, at a tea ceremony hosted by the rōjū, Sakai Tadakatsu, he suddenly fell over dead at the age of 29. His grave is at the Nodayama Cemetery in Kanazawa.

== Family ==
- Father: Maeda Toshitsune
- Mother: Tokugawa Tamahime (1599–1622), daughter of Tokugawa Hidetada and Asai Oeyo
- Wife: Tokugawa Ōhime (1627–1665), daughter of Tokugawa Yorinobu of Wakayama Domain
- Children (all by Ohime)
  - Maeda Tsunanori
  - Mankikumaru (1645–1649)

Preceded by Maeda Toshitsune	3rd (Maeda) daimyō of Kaga; 1639–1645	Succeeded by Maeda Tsunanori
