= Maeda Toshitaka (Nanokaichi) =

Japanese daimyō

Maeda Toshitaka (前田 利孝) (1594 – July 25, 1637) was a Japanese daimyō of the early Edo period, who ruled the Nanokaichi Domain. He was the fifth son of Maeda Toshiie.

His court title was Yamato no kami.

== Family ==
- Father: Maeda Toshiie (1539–1599)
- Mother: Jufuku-in
- Siblings:
  - Maeda Toshinaga (1562–1614)
  - Maeda Toshimasa
  - Maeda Toshitsune (1594–1658)
  - Maeda Toshitoyo
  - Maeda Kō
  - Maeda Ma'a
  - Maeda Gō
  - Maeda Chise

Preceded by none	1st daimyō of Nanokaichi; 1616–1637	Succeeded by Maeda Toshimoto
