= Maeda Nariyasu =

Japanese noble and samurai (1811–1884)

- 前田 斉泰
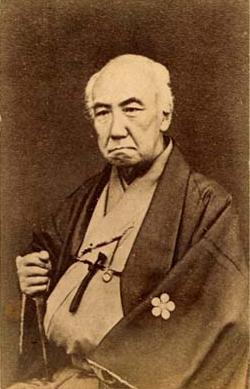

12th Daimyō of Kaga Domain
- In office 1822–1866
- Preceded by: Maeda Narinaga
- Succeeded by: Maeda Yoshiyasu

Personal details
- Born: August 28, 1811 Kanazawa, Japan
- Died: January 16, 1884 (aged 72)
- Spouse: Daughter of Tokugawa Ienari
- Parent: Maeda Shigemichi (father)

Maeda Nariyasu (前田 斉泰; August 28, 1811 – January 16, 1884) was an Edo period Japanese samurai, and the 12th daimyō of Kaga Domain in the Hokuriku region of Japan. He was the 13th hereditary lord of the Kanazawa Maeda clan.

== Biography ==
Nariyasu was born in Kanazawa in 1811, the 2nd son of the Kaga daimyō, Maeda Narinaga. His childhood name was Katsuchiyo (勝千代), later Katsumaru (勝丸) and Inuchiyo (犬千代). His father retired in 1822, passing family headship to Nariyasu (who first took the adult name of Toshiyasu (利康)); however, Narinaga retained control of domain affairs until his death in 1824. Rather notably, Nariyasu later became the first Kaga daimyō since Toshitsune to hold the high level court title of chūnagon. After his father's death, Nariyasu took personal control of Kaga's government, and implemented a policy of domainal reform. He was initially supportive of a conservative policy; however, after Commodore Perry's arrival at Uraga he was an active supporter of liberal policies and military modernization in Kaga Domain. As part of this policy, he founded the Nanao Shipyard (七尾軍艦所, Nanao gunkanjo).

Nariyasu was involved in much of the Kyoto-centered politics of the Bakumatsu period. He had entrusted a portion of the Kaga military to his son Maeda Yoshiyasu, who took part in the defense of the imperial palace during the Kinmon Incident of 1864. However, Yoshiyasu did not put up a committed fight, and in defeat, chose to flee Kyoto. Nariyasu, enraged, placed Yoshiyasu under solitary confinement, and ordered the seppuku of the two Kaga domain elders, Matsudaira Daini and Ōnoki Nakasaburō. Working with the castle warden Honda Masahito, he also confined the activities of the pro-sonnō jōi samurai in the Kanazawa.

Nariyasu officially retired in 1866, and was succeeded by his son Yoshiyasu; however, he retained personal control of the domain, very cautiously edging toward closer relations with Satsuma and Chōshū. Under Nariyasu's leadership, Kaga sided with the imperial side during the Boshin War, and took part in the imperial army's military action in the Echigo Campaign.

Nariyasu died in 1884, at age 72; he is buried in Ishikawa Prefecture.

== Family ==
- Father: Maeda Narinaga
- Mother: Oyae no Kata later Eiyou’in
- Wife: Tokugawa Yōhime (1813–1868), daughter of 11th shōgun Tokugawa Ienari
- Concubines:
  - Okisa no Kata
  - Omie no Kata later Shunsen’in
  - Otsu no Kata later Meikyoin
  - Ochisa no Kata
  - Oiku no Kata
- Children:
  - Son 1: Maeda Yoshiyasu (1830-1874) by Yōhime
  - Son 2: Senjiro (1832-1834) by Yōhime
  - Son 3: Maeda Toshinori (1833 – 1855) by Okisa no Kata
  - Son 4: Ikeda Yoshitaka (1834-1850) by Yo-hime
  - Son 5: Maeda Toshimichi (1835 – 1855) by Okisa no Kata
  - Son 6: Junrokuro (1836-1838) by Omie no Kata
  - Daughter 1: Manhime (1839-1839) by Okisa no Kata
  - Son 7: Maeda Toshika (1841 – 1920) by Otsu no Kata
  - Maeda Naoyori (1847-1856) by Otsu no Kata
  - Ryomaro (1848-1851) by Ochisa no Kata
  - Kannosuke (1849-1849) by Oiku no Kata
  - Maeda Toshiatsu (1856 – 1921) by Oiku no Kata
  - Hatsuko (1860-1929) by Oiku no Kata
  - Daughter: Hiroko (1863-1925) married Nijō Motohiro by Oiku no Kata
  - Maeda Toshitake (1865-1890) by Oiku no Kata
  - Daughter: Ikuko (1867-1943) married Asano Nagamichi later married Okabe Nagamoto by Oiku no Kata

== Published work ==
(published posthumously)

- Sarugaku menhai ron 申樂免廢論. Tokyo: Ishiguro Bunkichi 石黒文吉, 1934.

Preceded by Maeda Narinaga	12th (Maeda) daimyō of Kaga; 1822–1866	Succeeded by Maeda Yoshiyasu
