= Maeda Toshiyasu (Toyama) =

Japanese entomologist

Maeda Toshiyasu 前田 利保
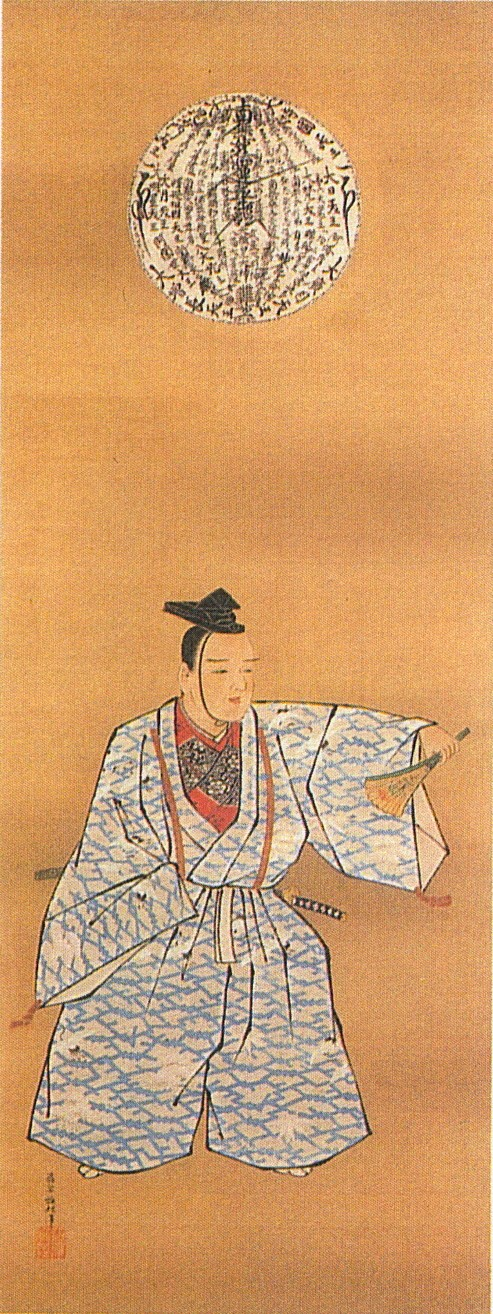
- Maeda Toshiyasu
- Born: March 23, 1800
- Died: September 14, 1859 (aged 59)
- Occupation: Daimyō of Toyama Domain (1835–1846)
- Father: Maeda Toshinori

Maeda Toshiyasu (前田 利保; March 23, 1800 – September 14, 1859) was the 10th daimyō of Toyama Domain in the Hokuriku region of Japan, and a noted Japanese naturalist and entomologist.

Toshiyasu was born in Edo as Keitaro (啓太郎), the second son of Maeda Toshinori, but was still underage on his father's death, so the domain was assigned to Maeda Toshitsuyo instead. In 1811, he was adopted by Toshitsuyo to restore the line of succession and became daimyō in 1835 when Toshitsuyo retired due to illness. On taking office, the domain was hit hard by a crop failure, which continued through 1838 as part of the Tenpō famine. The domain defaulted on all its debts, and was forced to take a 30,000 ryō loan from the shogunate in 1838, followed by an additional 25,000 ryō the following year. In 1841, the domain reported that it did not have the funds to make its required sankin kōtai to Edo. In 1846, citing ill heath, Toshiyasu went into retirement in favor of his sixth son, Maeda Toshitomo. His wife was a daughter of Asano Narikata of Hiroshima Domain.

Along with Kuroda Narikiyo of Fukuoka Domain, he was also a noted scientist, and organised a society of naturalists which met each month. An account was written of the subject discussed, for instance, in September 1840 they discussed the beetle family Scarabaeidae and wrote Kyōro-shakō-zusetsu in which twenty chafer species are scientifically drawn and described. As these studies were refined each member of the group became a specialist. Maede learned the Dutch language (the Japanese naturalists followed Philipp Franz von Siebold and also learned the French language Siebold's choice for Fauna Japonica and Flora Japonica) and translated the Dutch language Systema Naturae into Japanese. He is also noted for authoring the Honzō Tsūkan, an encyclopaedia of Chinese medicinal herbs, which remained uncompleted in 94 volumes at the time of his death.
