= Kaga Domain =

Domain of the Tokugawa Shogunate

Kaga Domain 加賀藩 Kaga-han
- Domain of Japan
- 1601–1871
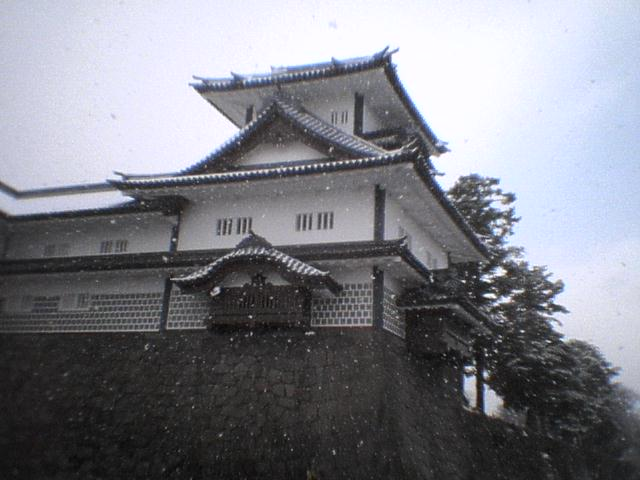
- Kanazawa Castle in Kanazawa

- Mon of the Kaga-Maeda

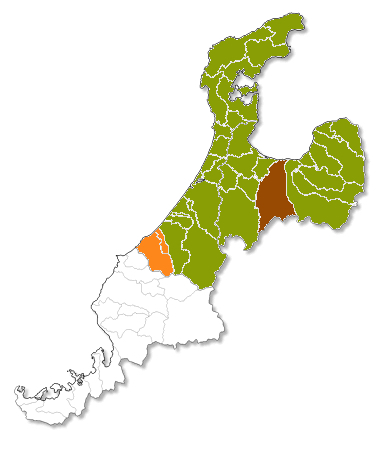
- Map of Kaga Domain (green), Daishōji Domain (orange) and Toyama Domain (brown) in late Edo period.
- Capital: Kanazawa Castle
- Area
  - Coordinates: 36°34′N 136°52′E
- Government
- Daimyō
  - 1601–1605: Maeda Toshinaga (first)
  - 1866–1871: Maeda Yoshiyasu (last)
- Historical era: Edo period
  - Established: 1601
  - Abolition of the han system: 1871
- Contained within
  - Province: Kaga, Etchū, Noto
- Today part of: Ishikawa Prefecture; Toyama Prefecture

The Kaga Domain (加賀藩, Kaga-han), also known as the Kanazawa Domain (金沢藩, Kanazawa-han), was a domain of the Tokugawa Shogunate of Japan during the Edo period from 1583 to 1871.

The Kaga Domain was based at Kanazawa Castle in Kaga Province, in the modern city of Kanazawa, located in the Chūbu region of the island of Honshu. The Kaga Domain was ruled for its existence by the tozama daimyō of the Maeda, and covered most of Kaga Province and Etchū Province and all of Noto Province in the Hokuriku region. The Kaga Domain had an assessed kokudaka of over one million koku, making it by far the largest domain of the Tokugawa shogunate. The Kaga Domain was dissolved in the abolition of the han system in 1871 by the Meiji government and its territory was absorbed into Ishikawa Prefecture and Toyama Prefecture.

== History ==
Maeda Toshiie was a distinguished military commander, a retainer of Oda Nobunaga and a close friend of Toyotomi Hideyoshi. A member of the Council of Five Elders who ruled Japan during the Sengoku period, he was granted the Kaga Domain in 1583. His eldest son, Maeda Toshinaga, supported Tokugawa Ieyasu in his rise to power and was rewarded by an increase in his lands to 1.25 million koku.

Toshinaga was succeeded by his brother Maeda Toshitsune, who created two cadet branches of the clan:

- Toyama Domain (100,000 koku), headed by descendants of Toshitsune's second son Toshitsugu (1617–1674)
- Daishōji Domain (100,000 koku), headed by descendants of Toshitsune's fourth son Toshiaki (1638–1692)

A third cadet line was founded by Toshitsune's brother Maeda Toshitaka for his services during the Siege of Osaka. This branch held the Nanokaichi Domain, rated at the minimum of 10,000 koku.

The Maeda clan ruled the Kaga Domain for the entirety of its existence until the abolition of the domains in 1871 after the Meiji Restoration and the overthrow of the Tokugawa Shogunate. The location of the main Edo residence of the Kaga Domain's daimyō is now the site of the Hongō campus of the University of Tokyo.

== Holdings ==
As with most domains in the han system, the Kaga Domain consisted of discontinuous territories calculated to provide the assigned kokudaka, based on periodic cadastral surveys and projected agricultural yields. At the end of the Tokugawa shogunate in 1868, the Kaga Domain consisted of the following holdings:

- Kaga Province
  - 177 villages in Kahoku District (all of district)
  - 235 villages in Ishikawa District (all of district)
  - 205 villages in Nomi District (all except 18 villages)
- Noto Province
  - 177 villages in Hakui District (all of district)
  - 128 villages in Kashima District (all of district)
  - 229 villages in Fugeshi District (all of district)
  - 75 villages in Suzu District (all except one village, which was shared)
- Etchū Province
  - 220 villages in Imizu District (all of district)
  - 490 villages in Tonami District (all of district)
  - 409 villages in Niikawa District (all of district)
- Ōmi Province
  - 3 villages in Takashima District

== List of daimyōs ==
#	Name	Tenure	Courtesy title	Court Rank	kokudaka
Maeda clan (tozama) 1583--.1871
0	Maeda Toshiie (前田利家)	1583–1599	Chikuzen-no-kami (筑前守)	Junior 2nd Rank (従二位); Dainagon (大納言)	830,000 koku
1	Maeda Toshinaga (前田利長)	1599–1605	Hizen-no-kami (肥前守)	Junior 3rd Rank (従三位); Chūnagon (中納言)	1,200,000 koku
2	Maeda Toshitsune (前田利常)	1605–1639	Hizen-no-kami (肥前守)	Junior 3rd Rank (従三位); Chūnagon (中納言)	1,200,000 koku
3	Maeda Mitsutaka (前田光高)	1639–1645	Chikuzen-no-kami (筑前守)	Senior 4th, Lower Grade (正四位下); Sakone-sho-sho (左近衛権少将)	1,200,000 koku
4	Maeda Tsunanori (前田綱紀)	1645–1723	Kaga-no-kami (加賀守)	Junior 3rd Rank (従三位); Sangi (参議)	1,030,000 koku
5	Maeda Yoshinori (前田吉徳)	1723–1745	Kaga-no-kami (加賀守)	Senior 4th, Lower Grade (正四位下); Sakone-chu-sho (左近衛権中将)	1,025,000 koku
6	Maeda Munetoki (前田宗辰)	1745–1746	Kaga-no-kami (加賀守)	Senior 4th, Lower Grade (正四位下); Sakone-chu-sho (左近衛権中将)	1,025,000 koku
7	Maeda Shigehiro (前田重熙)	1746–1753	Kaga-no-kami (加賀守)	Senior 4th, Lower Grade (正四位下); Sakone-chu-sho (左近衛権中将)	1,025,000 koku
8	Maeda Shigenobu (前田重靖)	1753	Kaga-no-kami (加賀守)	Senior 4th, Lower Grade (正四位下); Sakone-sho-sho (左近衛権少将)	1,025,000 koku
9	Maeda Shigemichi (前田重教)	1753–1771	Hizen-no-kami (肥前守)	Senior 4th, Lower Grade (正四位下); Sakone-chu-sho (左近衛権中将)	1,025,000 koku
10	Maeda Harunaga (前田治脩)	1771–1802	Kaga-no-kami (加賀守)	Senior 4th, Lower Grade (正四位下); Sakone-chu-sho (左近衛権中将)	1,025,000 koku
11	Maeda Narinaga (前田斉広)	1802–1822	Hizen-no-kami (肥前守)	Senior 4th, Lower Grade (正四位下); Sakone-chu-sho (左近衛権中将)	1,025,000 koku
12	Maeda Nariyasu (前田斉泰)	1822–1866	Kaga-no-kami (加賀守)	Senior 2nd Rank (正二位); Gon-Chūnagon (権中納言)	1,025,000 koku
13	Maeda Yoshiyasu (前田慶寧)	1866–1871	Kaga-no-kami (加賀守)	Junior 3rd Rank (従三位); Sangi (参議)	1,030,000 koku

=== Genealogy ===
The clan records were preserved over the course of centuries.

- I. Toshiie, 1st daimyō of Kaga (cr. 1583) (1539–1599; r. 1583–1599)
  - II. Toshinaga, 2nd daimyō of Kaga (1562–1614; r. 1599–1605)
  - III. Toshitsune, 3rd daimyō of Kaga (1594–1658; r. 1605–1639)
    - IV. Mitsutaka, 4th daimyō of Kaga (1616–1645; r. 1639–1645)
      - V. Tsunanori, 5th daimyō of Kaga (1643–1724; r. 1645–1723)
        - VI. Yoshinori, 6th daimyō of Kaga (1690–1745; r. 1723–1745)
          - VII. Munetoki, 7th daimyō of Kaga (1725–1747; r. 1745–1747)
          - VIII. Shigehiro, 8th daimyō of Kaga (1729–1753; r. 1747–1753)
          - IX. Shigenobu, 9th daimyō of Kaga (1735–1753; r. 1753)
          - X. Shigemichi, 10th daimyō of Kaga (1741–1786; r. 1754–1771)
            - XII. Narinaga, 12th daimyō of Kaga (1782–1824; r. 1802–1822)
              - XIII. Nariyasu, 13th daimyō of Kaga (1811–1884; r. 1822–1866)
                - XIV. Yoshiyasu, 14th daimyō of Kaga, 14th family head (1830–1874; r. 1866–1869; Governor: 1869–1871; family head: 1869–1874)
                  - Yoshitsugu, 15th family head, 1st Marquess (1858–1900; 15th family head 1874–1900, Marquess: 1884).
          - XI. Harunaga, 11th daimyō of Kaga (1745–1810; r. 1771–1802).
        - Toshiaki, 4th daimyō of Kaga-Daishōji (1691–1737)
          - Toshimichi, 5th daimyō of Kaga-Daishōji (1733–1781)
            - Toshitoyo, 9th daimyō of Etchū-Toyama (1771–1836)
              - Toshihiro, 11th daimyō of Ueno-Nanokaichi (1823–1877)
                - Toshiaki, Governor of Nanokaichi, 1st Viscount (1850–1896; Governor of Nanokaichi 1869–1871, created 1st Viscount 1884)
                  - Toshinari, 16th family head, 2nd Marquess (1885–1942; 16th family head and 2nd Marquess 1900–1942)
                    - Toshitatsu, 17th family head, 3rd Marquess (1908–1989; 17th family head 1942–1989, 3rd Marquess 1942–1947)
                      - Toshihiro, 18th family head (1935– ; 18th family head 1989–2022)
                        - Toshitaka (1963–) : 19th family head 2022 -
                          - Toshikyo (1993–)

== See also ==
- Abolition of the han system
- List of Han
