= Flora Japonica (1835 book) =

Publication by Philipp Franz von Siebold

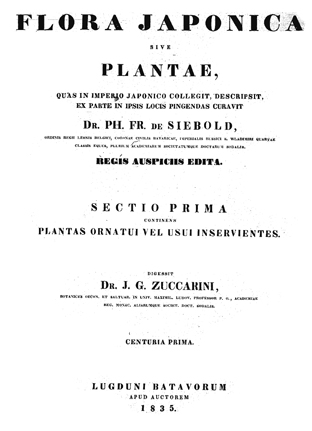
Title page of Flora Japonica by Siebold and Zuccarini

Flora Japonica is a Flora written in Leyden by Bavarian botanist and traveler Philipp Franz von Siebold in collaboration with fellow Bavarian Joseph Gerhard Zuccarini. The work, written in Latin, carries the full title of Flora Japonica; sive, Plantae Quas in Imperio Japonico Collegit, Descripsit, ex Parte in Ipsis Locis Pingendas Curavit..

Begun in 1835 by Siebold and Zuccarini, work continued until 1842. After Zuccarini's death in 1848, Siebold discontinued his involvement with the work, and the materials accrued to Rijksherbarium in Leyden. After Siebold's death in 1866, F. A. W. Miquel, director of the Rijksherbarium, completed the work.

Siebold was already widely known in Japan for various endeavors, and this work cemented his scientific fame in Europe.

== Background ==
In service of the Dutch East India Company, Siebold was stationed on Dejima, the artificial island next to Nagasaki, which served as then-isolated Japan's gateway to the West. He arrived in 1823, serving as both a physician and botanist, remaining in Japan until 1830. During his stay in the Orient, he started a small botanical garden behind his home and amassed over 1,000 native plants. In a specially built glasshouse he cultivated the Japanese plants to endure the Dutch climate and he sent many herbarium specimens to Europe. Following his return to Europe, he settled in Leyden and began work with Zuccarini on the Flora.

== Work ==
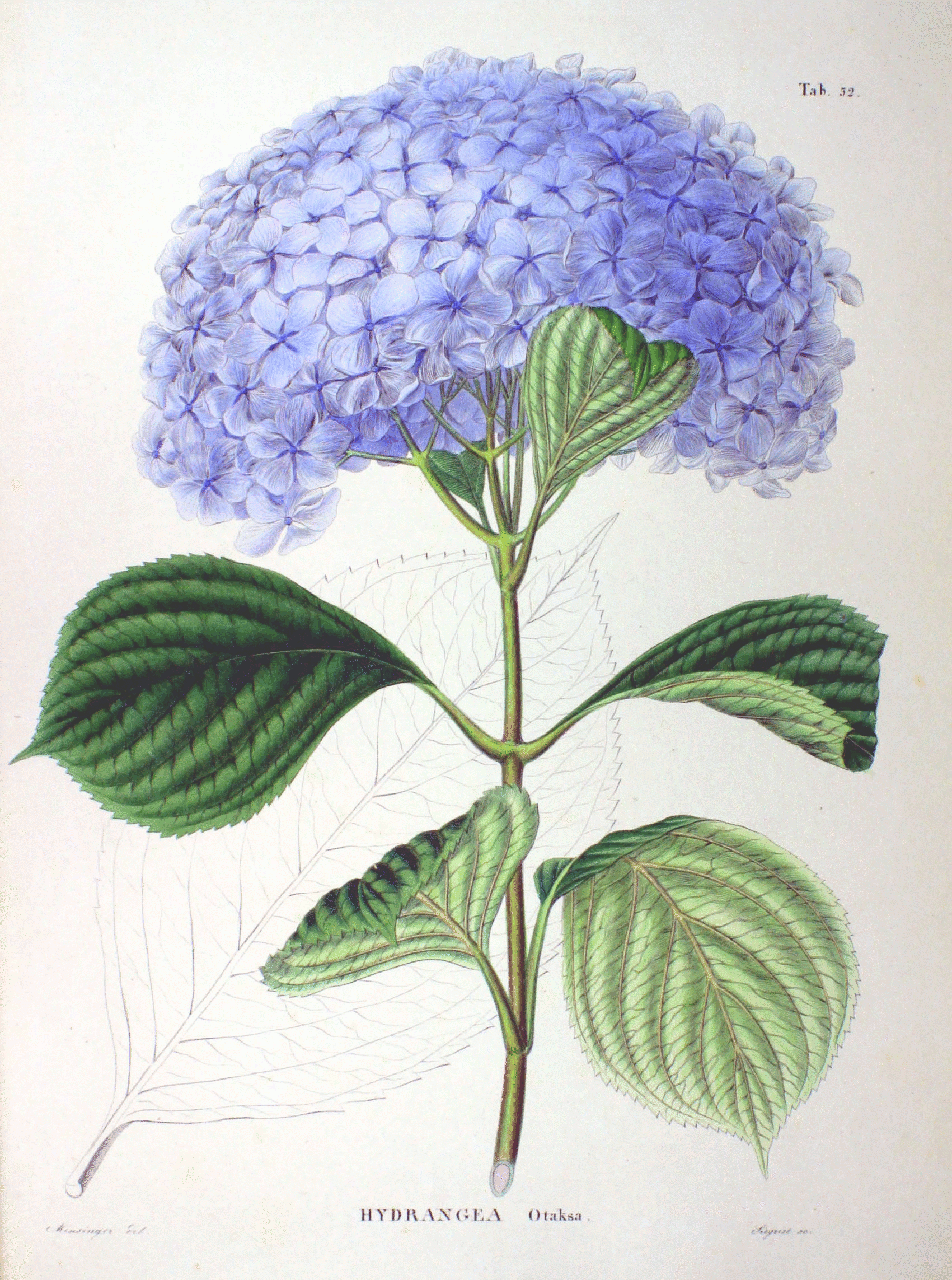
A color plate of Hydrangea macrophylla as "Hydrangea otaksa" in Flora Japonica; Siebold named it for his wife, Kusumoto Taki (楠本滝)

The work was published as 2 volumes in 30 parts, with first part of volume I published in December 1835. Volume I was completed in June 1841. Parts 1-5 of the second volume were issued between 1842 and 1844, after which work by Siebold stopped. The final 5 parts of the second volume were issued by Miquel in 1870. Copies of the original work are rare, and one fetched US$27,500 at auction in 2013 ($38,009 today).
