= Tozama daimyō =

Class of daimyō (warlords) considered outsiders by the rulers of feudal Japan

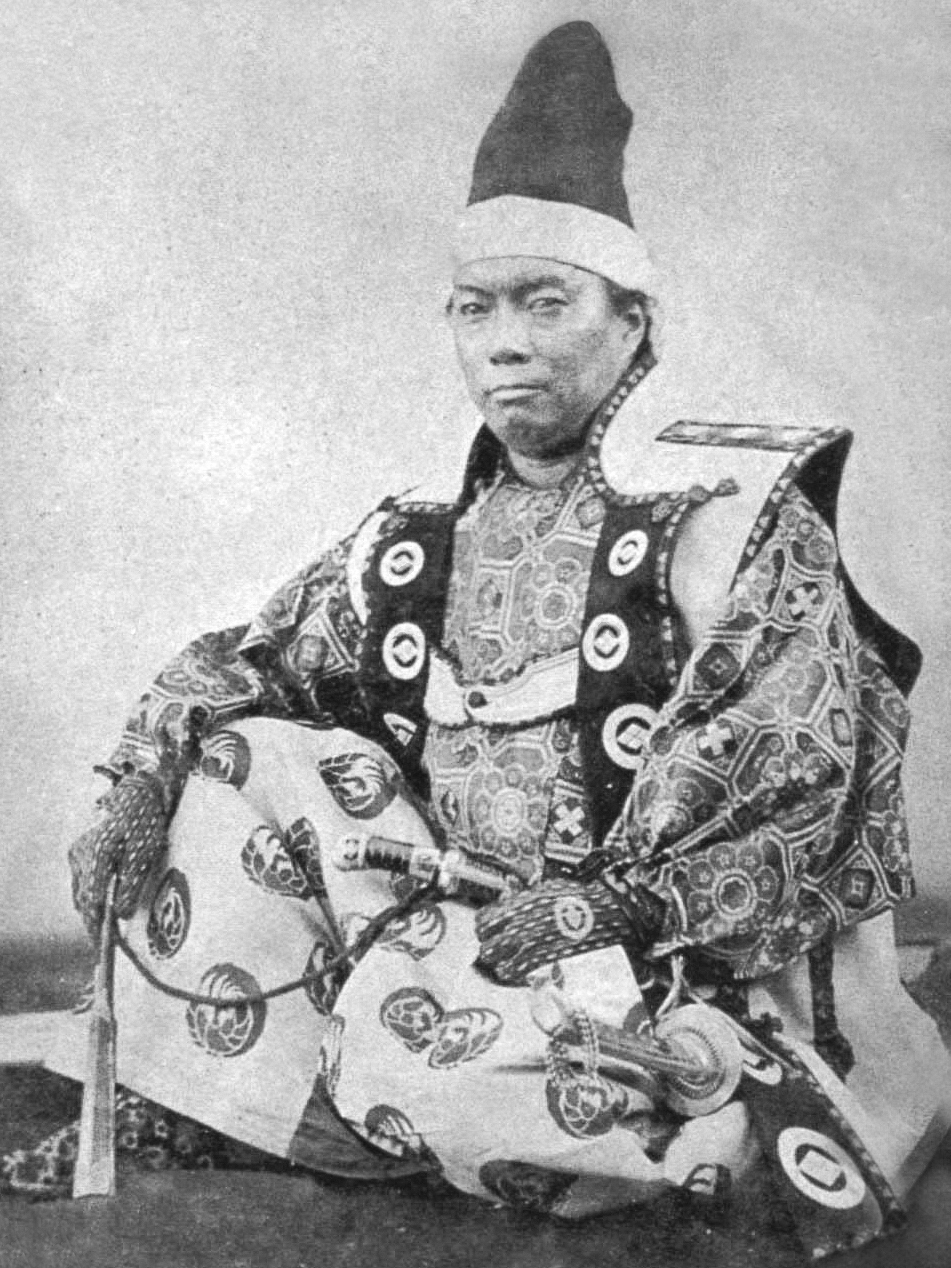
Matsumae Takahiro, the only tozama daimyō to become an Elder or rōjū (老中) during the Edo period (江戸時代)

Tozama daimyō (外様大名, "outside daimyō") was a class of powerful magnates or daimyō (大名) considered to be outsiders by the ruler of Japan during the Edo period (江戸時代). Tozama daimyō were classified in the Tokugawa shogunate (江戸幕府) as daimyō who became hereditary vassals of the Tokugawa after the Battle of Sekigahara (関ヶ原の戦い). Tozama daimyō were discriminated against by the Tokugawa and opposed to the fudai daimyō, who were allies or vassals of Tokugawa before Sekigahara.

== Origins ==
Originally, the concept of tozama daimyō emerged in Japan along with the daimyō after the rise of the Kamakura shogunate (鎌倉幕府) in the 12th century. Tozama applied to a daimyō who was considered an "outsider" by successive Shōguns, Emperors, and shikkens (執権) that ruled over Japan at any given time. Typically, a tozama had a loose or indirect relationship with the current ruler, and this definition remained intact during the subsequent Ashikaga shogunate (足利幕府, 1336–1573, also known as the Muromachi (室町幕府)), and the Sengoku period (戦国時代, 1467–1615, "Age of Warring States").

== Edo period ==
The establishment of the Tokugawa shogunate in 1600 redefined tozama daimyō as the daimyō who submitted as vassals to the Tokugawa only after the decisive Battle of Sekigahara, including those who fought for the Tokugawa at the battle but were not official vassals. Tokugawa Ieyasu had treated the great tozama amicably, but his grandson Tokugawa Iemitsu was less tolerant of them during his rule between 1623 and 1626. Tozama and their descendants were distrusted and the Tokugawa shogunate discriminated against them in favor of the fudai daimyō. Tozama were largely excluded from the shogunate government, the Bakufu, and their numbers were limited compared to the fudai who filled the administration's ranks. Many of the largest and wealthiest han—the personal feudal domains of the daimyō—were ruled by tozama, including the Maeda clan of the Kaga Domain with a value of 1,000,000 koku under the Kokudaka system. However, this was a deliberate Tokugawa plan to keep the tozama in check, as fudai daimyō were stationed in smaller domains in strategic locations, including along major roads and near important cities. Many notable tozama families, including the Shimazu, the Mori, the Date, the Hachisuka, and the Uesugi, were based in western and northern Honshu and Kyushu in contrast to the Tokugawa based in the eastern city of Edo. Most, but not all, of these families had been living in roughly the same regions for centuries before the Tokugawa shogunate. Tozama daimyō heavily profited from trade in the 17th century, particularly in western Japan where most of the country's important ports were located. The shogunate responded in Sakoku policies of isolationism, preventing the ports of western Honshu and Kyūshū from trading with foreigners and sending Japanese vessels abroad.

The Tozama daimyō had higher levels of independent power and local autonomy, and conducted their judicial, administrative and military affairs in the name of the local daimyos like sovereigns. The Tozama domains' relationship to the Shogun was one of paying tribute, military levy and guard duty obligations.

The decline of the Tokugawa shogunate during the Bakumatsu period from 1853 led to lessening discrimination against tozama daimyō. In November 1864, Matsumae Takahiro, the tozama daimyō of the Matsumae clan, was appointed as rōjū, one of the highest-ranking government posts in the Tokugawa government. Tozama formed the nucleus of the growing anti-Tokugawa movement, with the Satsuma and Chōshū (Shimazu and Mori clans respectively) primarily responsible for the fall of the Tokugawa shogunate in the Meiji Restoration. Rallying other tozama and even fudai to their cause in support of the Imperial Court, they fought against the shogunate, Aizu Domain, and the Ōuetsu Reppan Dōmei during the Boshin War of 1868 to 1869. Many people from Satsuma and Chōshū dominated politics of the Empire of Japan in the ensuing decades, and well into the 20th century, as part of the Meiji oligarchy. The distinction between tozama and fudai became obsolete when the daimyō were morphed into the new kazoku aristocracy.

== Sources ==
- Ooms, Herman (1975). Charismatic Bureaucrat. Chicago: University of Chicago Press.
