= Maeda clan =

Japanese samurai clan

Maeda clan 前田氏
- Maeda clan emblem
- Home province: Owari Province
- Parent house: Sugawara clan
- Titles: Various
- Founder: unknown
- Founding year: Muromachi period
- Dissolution: still extant
- Ruled until: 1873 (Abolition of the han system)

The Maeda clan (前田氏, Maeda-shi) was a Japanese samurai clan who occupied most of the Hokuriku region of central Honshū from the end of the Sengoku period through the Meiji Restoration of 1868. The Maeda claimed descent from the Sugawara clan through Sugawara no Kiyotomo and Sugawara no Michizane in the eighth and ninth centuries; however, the line of descent is uncertain. The Maeda rose to prominence as daimyō of Kaga Domain under the Edo period Tokugawa shogunate, which was second only to the Tokugawa clan in kokudaka (land value).

== Origins ==
"Maeda" is a place name in Kaitō District of western Owari Province, and was the seat of the senior branch of the Maeda clan in the Azuchi-Momoyama period. Maeda Nagatane (1550-1631) entered into the service of Maeda Toshiie, and his descendants became hereditary retainers of the Maeda clan of Kaga Domain. This branch received the kazoku peerage title of danshaku (baron) after the Meiji restoration.

A cadet branch of the Owari Maeda were given the castle of Arako in what is now part of Nakagawa-ku, Nagoya. Maeda Toshimasa (d.1560) entered the service of Oda Nobuhide, who nominally ruled Owari Province from his seat at Kiyosu Castle. His son, Maeda Toshihisa (d.1587) also served the Oda clan, and was ordered to retire in favour of his brother, Maeda Toshiie.

Another notable member of the family was Maeda Toshimasu, commonly known as Maeda Keiji. Though he was biologically the son of Takigawa Kazumasu, he was adopted by Maeda Toshihisa, the older brother of Maeda Toshiie. He was recognized as a renowned warrior. According to legend, he broke the front line of the Mogami clan leading a group of just eight riders during a battle in which he fought for the Uesugi clan.

== Sengoku and Edo period ==
Maeda Toshiie was one of the leading generals under Oda Nobunaga. He began his career as a page, rising through the ranks a member of the akahoro-shū (赤母衣衆), under Nobunaga's personal command and later became an infantry captain (ashigaru taishō 足軽大将). From his youth, he was a close confidant of Nobunaga and a friend of Toyotomi Hideyoshi. After defeating the Asakura clan, he fought under Shibata Katsuie in the Hokuriku region in the suppression of the Ikkō-ikki, and participated in the 1570 Battle of Anegawa and the 1577 Battle of Tedorigawa. He was eventually granted the fief of Fuchu in Etchū Province (30,000 koku), and in 1581 was given Noto Province (230,000 koku), to which he added his other territories in Kaga Province to form Kaga Domain. After Nobunaga's death, he pledged fealty to Toyotomi Hideyoshi, and his territories were expanded to cover all of the three provinces of Noto, Kaga and Etchū, with a kokudaka of well over a million koku. Toshiie divided his fief among his sons. His eldest son Maeda Toshinaga participated in the Battle of Sekigahara and built Kanazawa Castle; he also was recognised as daimyō of Kaga Domain under the Tokugawa shogunate.

The Maeda clan attempted to maintain good relations with the Tokugawa clan through marriage ties, and, although a tozama clan, were permitted to use the "Matsudaira" name as an honorific patronym.

The Maeda clan continued to rule Kaga Domain from their headquarters in Kanazawa from 1583 until the Meiji restoration in 1868. Maeda Toshitsune established two cadet branches of the clan at Toyama and Daishōji. Another cadet branch of the clan was established by Maeda Toshitaka, the fifth son of Maeda Toshiie, at Nanokaichi Domain in Kōzuke Province. All of these cadet branches also continued to be ruled by the Maeda clan until the Meiji restoration. However, the Maeda clan was often beset by O-Ie Sōdō incidents, and many of the clan heads died young, or without heir. The clan did not play a prominent role in the Meiji restoration. After the start of the Meiji period, the former heads of the various branches of the Maeda clan were made peers under the kazoku peerage system.

== Head Family ==
=== Owari-Arako ===
1. Maeda Toshitaka
2. Maeda Toshimasa
3. Maeda Toshihisa (d.1587)
4. Maeda Toshiie
5. Maeda Hidetsugu (d. 1586)

=== Mino ===
Mino-Maeda family crest

1. Maeda Nagatane (1550-1631)
2. Maeda Naotomo (1586-1630)
3. Maeda Naomasa (1605-1631)
4. Maeda Takasada (1628-1707)
5. Maeda Takayuki (1663-1721)
6. Maeda Takasuke (1683-1753)
7. Maeda Takamasa (1723-1777)
8. Maeda Takatomo (1759-1832)
9. Maeda Takamoto (1808-1856)
10. Maeda Takanaka (1840-1857)
11. Maeda Takanori (1847-1888)
12. Maeda Ko
13. Maeda Takayuki
14. Maeda Takaya

=== Kaga ===
Kaga-Maeda family crest

1. Maeda Toshitaka
2. Maeda Toshimasa
3. Maeda Toshiie
4. Maeda Toshinaga
5. Maeda Toshitsune
6. Maeda Mitsutaka
7. Maeda Tsunanori
8. Maeda Yoshinori
9. Maeda Munetoki
10. Maeda Shigehiro
11. Maeda Shigenobu
12. Maeda Shigemichi
13. Maeda Harunaga
14. Maeda Narinaga
15. Maeda Nariyasu
16. Maeda Yoshiyasu
17. Maeda Toshitsugu (1858-1900)
18. Toshinari Maeda (1885-1942)
19. Toshitatsu Maeda (1908-1989)
20. Toshiyasu Maeda (b.1935)
21. Toshinori Maeda (b.1963, Heir)
22. Toshiyuki Maeda (2nd generation heir)
23. Toshiyoshi Maeda (President-elect, President and CEO of Inoda Coffee)

=== Toyama ===
1. Maeda Toshitsugu (1617 – 1674)
2. Maeda Masatoshi (1649 – 1706)
3. Maeda Toshioki (1678 – 1733)
4. Maeda Toshitaka (1690 – 1745)
5. Maeda Toshiyuki (1730 – 1762)
6. Maeda Toshitomo (1737 – 1794)
7. Maeda Toshihisa (1762 – 1787)
8. Maeda Toshinori (1768 – 1801)
9. Maeda Toshitsuyo (1772 – 1836)
10. Maeda Toshiyasu (1800-1859)
11. Maeda Toshitomo (1834 – 1854)
12. Maeda Toshikata (1835 – 1904)
13. Maeda Toshiatsu (1856 – 1921)
14. Maeda Toshio (1886 – 1966)
15. Maeda Toshinobu
16. Maeda Akitoshi

=== Daishoji ===
1. Maeda Toshiharu (1618 – 1660)
2. Maeda Toshiaki I (1638 – 1692)
3. Maeda Toshinao (1672 – 1711)
4. Maeda Toshiakira (1691 – 1737)
5. Maeda Toshimichi I (1733 – 1781)
6. Maeda Toshiaki II (1758 – 1791)
7. Maeda Toshitane (1760 – 1788)
8. Maeda Toshiyasu (1779 – 1806)
9. Maeda Toshikore (1785 – 1837)
10. Maeda Toshinaka (1812 – 1838)
11. Maeda Toshihira (1824 – 1849)
12. Maeda Toshinori (1833 – 1855)
13. Maeda Toshimichi II (1835 – 1855)
14. Maeda Toshika (1841 – 1920)
15. Maeda Toshimitsu (1905-?)
16. Maeda Toshihiro (b.1929)

=== Daishōjishinden ===
1. Maeda Toshimasa (Toshiharu) (1684-1709)

=== Nanokaichi ===
1. Maeda Toshitaka
2. Maeda Toshimoto (1625-1685)
3. Maeda Toshihiro (1645-1693)
4. Maeda Toshiyoshi (1670-1695)
5. Maeda Toshifuda (1689-1708)
6. Maeda Toshitada (1699-1756)
7. Maeda Toshihisa (1762 – 1787)
8. Maeda Toshiakira (1691 – 1737)
9. Maeda Toshimochi (1768-1828)
10. Maeda Toshiyoshi (1791-1839)
11. Maeda Toshiakira (1823-1877)
12. Maeda Toshikaki (1850-1896)
13. Maeda Toshisada
14. Maeda Toshitami
15. Maeda Fumisada

== Other notable figures ==
- Gōhime
- Maeda Chiyo
- Maeda Matsu
- Maeda Riku
- Maeda Toshimasa (1578)

== See also ==
- Daishōji Domain
- Kaga Domain
- Nanokaichi Domain
- Toyama Domain
