= List of samurai from the Sengoku period =

A list of samurai from the Sengoku Period (c.1467−c.1603), a sub-period of the Muromachi Period in feudal Japan.

== Samurai ==
A

- Akai Naomasa
- Akai Teruko
- Akao Kiyotsuna
- Akashi Takenori
- Akechi Hidemitsu
- Akechi Mitsuharu
- Akechi Mitsutada
- Akechi Mitsutsuna
- Akechi Mitsuyoshi
- Akiyama Nobutomo
- Amakasu Kagemochi
- Anayama Nobukimi
- Anayama Nobutomo
- Andō Morinari
- Asakura Kageaki
- Azai Hisamasa
- Azai Sukemasa

B

- Baba Nobuharu
- Ban Naoyuki

C

- Chaya Shirōjirō
- Chōsokabe Nobuchika

D

- Date Shigezane

E

- Endo Naotsune

G

- Gotō Matabei

H

- Hara Masatane
- Hashiba Hidekatsu
- Hattori Masanari
- Hayashi Narinaga
- Honda Narishige
- Honda Shigetsugu
- Honjō Shigenaga
- Hōjō Tsunashige
- Hōjō Ujikuni
- Hōjō Ujinori
- Hōjō Ujiteru
- Hoshina Masatoshi

I

- Ichinomiya Munekore
- Ii Naochika
- Ii Naomori
- Ii Naotora
- Imafuku Masakazu
- Inaba Yoshimichi
- Iriki-In Shigetomo
- Ishikawa Kazumasa
- Iio Noritsura
- Iio Tsuratatsu
- Isono Kazumasa
- Iwanari Tomomichi

K

- Kaihime
- Kakizaki Kageie
- Kani Saizō
- Karasawa Genba
- Katakura Shigenaga
- Katsurayama Ujimoto
- Kimura Shigenari
- Kobayakawa Hidekane
- Kojima Yatarō
- Kōsaka Masanobu
- Kuki Yoshitaka
- Kuki Moritaka
- Kumabe Chikanaga

M

- Maeda Nagatane
- Maeda Keiji
- Maeda Toshimasa
- Makara Naotaka
- Matsuda Masachika
- Matsudaira Nobuyasu
- Matsunaga Danjo Hisahide
- Mori Nagayoshi
- Mori Ranmaru
- Mori Yoshinari
- Mōri Katsunaga
- Mōri Motokiyo
- Mōri Yoshikatsu
- Murai Nagayori
- Murakami Yoshikiyo

N

- Nagano Narimasa
- Nagao Fujikage
- Nagao Masakage
- Nagao Tamekage
- Naitō Masatoyo
- Nakagawa Hidemasa
- Naoe Kagetsuna
- Naoe Kanetsugu
- Natsume Yoshinobu
- Niiro Tadamoto
- Nomi Munekatsu

O

- Obata Masamori
- Obata Toramori
- Obu Toramasa
- Oda Hidenobu
- Oda Hidetaka
- Oda Katsunaga
- Oda Nobuharu
- Oda Nobuhiro
- Oda Nobukane
- Oda Nobutada
- Oda Nobutoki
- Oda Nobuyuki
- Oniniwa Tsunamoto
- Oyamada Nobushige

S

- Saji Kazunari
- Saitō Toshimitsu
- Sakai Masahisa
- Sakuma Morimasa
- Sakuma Nobumori
- Sanada Nobutsuna
- Sanada Nobuyuki
- Sanada Yukimura
- Shibata Naganori
- Shima Sakon
- Shimazu Iehisa
- Shimazu Toshihisa
- Shimazu Toyohisa
- Sogō Kazumasa
- Sue Harukata

T

- Tachibana Ginchiyo
- Tachibana Muneshige
- Takeda Nobukado
- Takeda Nobushige
- Takenaka Hanbei
- Takenaka Shigekado
- Torii Suneemon
- Toyotomi Hidenaga
- Toyotomi Hideyori
- Tsutsui Sadatsugu

U

- Uesugi Kagetora
- Uesugi Tomosada
- Ujiie Naotomo
- Ujiie Yukihiro
- Usami Sadamitsu

Y

- Yamagata Masakage
- Yamamoto Kansuke
- Yamanaka Shikanosuke
- Yasuke

== See also ==
- Sengoku Period topics
- People of the Muromachi period
