= Nobunaga Concerto =

Japanese manga series

- First tankōbon volume cover

信長協奏曲(コンツェルト) (Nobunaga Kontseruto)
- Genre: Historical
- Manga
- Written by: Ayumi Ishii
- Published by: Shogakukan
- Imprint: Monthly Shōnen Sunday Comics
- Magazine: Monthly Shōnen Sunday
- Original run: May 12, 2009 – September 11, 2026
- Volumes: 24
- Anime television series
- Directed by: Yūsuke Fujikawa
- Produced by: Noriko Ozaki
- Written by: Natsuko Takahashi
- Music by: Masaru Yokoyama
- Original network: Fuji TV
- Original run: July 12, 2014 – September 20, 2014
- Episodes: 10
- Television drama
- Produced by: Ken Murase; Kenichi Hatori
- Written by: Masafumi Ishida
- Music by: Taku Takahashi
- Original network: Fuji TV
- Original run: October 13, 2014 – December 22, 2014
- Episodes: 11
- Related
- Live-action film (2016)
- icon

Nobunaga Concerto (Japanese: 信長協奏曲(コンツェルト), Hepburn: Nobunaga Kontseruto) is a Japanese manga series written and illustrated by Ayumi Ishii. It was serialized in Shogakukan's Monthly Shōnen Sunday from May 2009 to September 2026, with its chapters collected in 24 tankōbon volumes.

A ten-episode anime television series adaptation was broadcast on Fuji TV from July to September 2014. An eleven-episode television drama adaptation was also broadcast on Fuji TV from October to December 2014. A live-action film premiered in Japan in January 2016.

As of February 2016, the Nobunaga Concerto manga had over 3.5 million copies in circulation. In 2012, the manga won the 57th Shogakukan Manga Award for the shōnen category.

== Plot ==
The story centers on Saburō, a high school student who travels back in time to Japan's Sengoku era. There, he must become Oda Nobunaga, the famed warlord who helped unite Japan.

== Characters ==
=== Main characters ===
Saburō (サブロー)
Voiced by: Mamoru Miyano
Played by: Shun Oguri
Saburo is a high school boy who finds himself traveling back in time to Japan's Sengoku Era. He meets Oda Nobunaga, who asks Saburo to impersonate him because they look like identical. He occasionally uses his textbook regarding Nobunaga's life to guide him through the events he needs to create.
Oda Nobunaga (織田信長)
Voiced by: Yuki Kaji
Played by: Shun Oguri
The real Oda Nobunaga. Unable to withstand the political pressure as Nobunaga, he has Saburo take his place while he travels around the country. He eventually ends up taking over the Akechi Clan after the previous leader had no heir, and now works under Saburō (fake Nobunaga) as Akechi Mitsuhide.
Kichō (帰蝶)
Voiced by: Nana Mizuki
Played by: Kou Shibasaki
Kichō is Nobunaga's wife
Kinoshita Tōkichirō (木下藤吉郎)
Voiced by: Yuichi Nakamura
Played by: Takayuki Yamada
Tokichiro was originally a spy from the Imagawa, sent to ruin the Oda. Tokichiro initially attempted to incite rebellion through Nobuyuki as well as acting as a stable boy for the Oda army in the Imagawa's advance. Both areas failed as Nobuyuki was betrayed by Katsuie and, due to a miscommunication, he sends incorrect info to Yoshimito, leading to his death at Okehazama. With no place to go, he bides his time under Nobunaga, waiting for the perfect opportunity to kill him.
Oichi (お市)
Voiced by: Aoi Yūki
Played by: Kiko Mizuhara
Oichi is Nobunaga's younger sister.

=== Other characters ===
Ikeda Tsuneoki (池田恒興)
Voiced by: Kazuyuki Okitsu
Played by: Osamu Mukai
Shibata Katsuie (柴田勝家)
Voiced by: Rikiya Koyama
Played by: Masahiro Takashima
Originally a retainer of Nobuyuki, Katsuie was initially unable to understand Nobunaga's behaviour, and attempted to kill Matsudaira Motoyasu in order to show Nobunaga's incompetence. Years later, he soon realizes that Nobunaga not only has the support of the people, but also has the ambition to rule the land. Siding with Nobunaga instead, he is still often baffled by his lord's decision making.
Maeda Toshiie (前田利家)
Voiced by: Shintarō Asanuma
Played by: Taisuke Fujigaya
A violent man, he was found by Nobunaga fighting in the streets. As punishment for his rowdy behaviour, he was not allowed to serve in the army until after Nobunaga's first few battles.
Sassa Narimasa (佐々成政)
Voiced by: Kenta Miyake
Played by: Shinnosuke Abe
Like Toshiie, Narimasa was a violent person and was fighting Toshiie when they were both scouted by Nobunaga. Later on, he becomes a full-fledged officer of the Oda.
Niwa Nagahide (丹羽長秀)
Voiced by: Shinya Takahashi
Played by: Masanobu Sakata
Takugen (沢彦)
Voiced by: Kenichi Ogata
Played by: Denden
Matsudaira Motoyasu (徳川家康)
Voiced by: Jun Fukuyama, Nozomi Masu (young)
Played by: Gaku Hamada
Initially a young hostage for the Oda, Motoyasu becomes indebted to Nobunaga after he rescues the young child's life from Katsuie's assassination attempt. Being given Saburo ("Nobunaga")'s modern day pornographic magazine, he eventually forms an alliance with the Oda after the collapse of the Imagawa forces at Okehazama to repay his debt to Nobunaga.
Takenaka Hanbei (竹中半兵衛)
Voiced by: Takahiro Sakurai
Played by: Naohito Fujiki
A strategist that initially served Saito Tatsuoki, he became dissatisfied with his lord's complacency over Inabayama Castle's victories against Nobunaga, and proceeds to take the castle for himself. Interested in Nobunaga's vision of the world, he eventually turns against the Saito, and joins the Oda forces.
Azai Nagamasa (浅井長政)
Voiced by: Ryōhei Kimura
Played by: Issei Takahashi
Azai Hisamasa (浅井久政)
Voiced by: Akio Nojima
Played by: Kunio Murai
Endo Naotsune (遠藤直経)
Voiced by: Takaya Hashi
Isono Kazumasa (磯野員昌)
Voiced by: Jun Hazumi
Mori Yoshinari (森可成)
Voiced by: Ryō Sugisaki
Played by: Yoshiyuki Morishita
Mori Nagayoshi (森長可)
Voiced by: Hiroyuki Yoshino
Played by: Takumi Kitamura
Mori Ranmaru (森蘭丸)
Voiced by: Ayumu Murase
Mori Bōmaru (森坊丸)
Voiced by: Marie Miyake
Mori Rikimaru (森力丸)
Voiced by: Nichika Ōmori
Ashikaga Yoshiaki (足利義昭)
Voiced by: Tomokazu Sugita
Played by: Keisuke Horibe
Matsunaga Hisahide (松永久秀)
Voiced by: Takaya Kuroda
Played by: Arata Furuta
Originally a Yakuza member before being transported to the past, Hisahide relishes the chaos of the Sengoku period, believing it to be a battle where only the strongest win. Meeting Nobunaga after his rejection of the Shogun's letter to attack the Oda, Hisahide offers his loose loyalty to Nobunaga until the time he can rebel.
Oda Nobuyuki (織田信行)
Voiced by: Kōki Uchiyama
Played by: Yūya Yagira
Nobunaga's younger brother, whom he spites to the core. Nobuyuki, while afraid of Nobunaga, was also tired of his brother's erratic behaviour. In his brother's youth, Nobuyuki had Nohime kidnapped, which was exposed by Nobunaga in front of their father. Years later, he is incited into rebellion by Kinoshita, falsely believing that the Imagawa would support him as the lord of Owari. Failing in his rebellion, he attempts to kill Nobunaga once more when he is sick, only to be betrayed by Katsuie. After his third failure, he commits suicide, but encourages Nobunaga to take the world without the permission of others.
Hirate Masahide (平手政秀)
Voiced by: Motomu Kiyokawa
An elderly man who is the tutor of Nobunaga, he is befuddled by Nobunaga's lax behaviour and constantly remonstrates his lord for his laziness. While reviewing conscripts, he notices that Kinoshita is a spy for another warlord and rejects him. Eventually, he is murdered by Kinoshita and another Imagawa spy, and dies telling Nobunaga to not let the world think him a fool. Kinoshita would later kill his associate in order to be able to infiltrate the Oda Army.
Saitō Dōsan (斎藤道三)
Voiced by: Yōsuke Akimoto
Played by: Toshiyuki Nishida
The Lord of Mino and the father of Nohime, he was originally a policeman named Nagai Shinichi, who had a family with a daughter. Travelling to the past mysteriously like Saburo, he stays at the Sengoku Period for 30 years. Upon seeing Saburo's school uniform, he gives the younger man his uniform, and later his pistol and a letter to his original daughter and another to Nohime. Like in history, he is killed by his sons in the conflict at Mino.
Hori Hidemasa (堀秀政)
Voiced by: Akira Ishida
Hachisuka Koroku (蜂須賀小六)
Voiced by: Takashi Matsuyama
Played by: Katsuya
Yasuke (弥助)
Voiced by: Kōichi Yamadera
Originally a batter for an unknown professional baseball team, Yasuke was transported to the Sengoku period, where he is found by Nobunaga. While taken in as an officer, he is bewildered by the savage culture of the time period as well as his baseball bat being mistaken as a weapon.
Saitō Yoshitatsu (斉藤義竜)
Voiced by: Kenji Hamada
Played by: Hirofumi Arai
Asakura Kagetake (朝倉景健)
Voiced by: Hiroshi Naka

== Media ==
=== Manga ===
Written and illustrated by Ayumi Ishii, Nobunaga Concerto debuted in the first issue of Shogakukan's Monthly Shōnen Sunday, released on May 12, 2009. The series finished after 17 years on September 11, 2026. Shogakukan has collected its chapters into individual tankōbon volumes. 24 volumes were released from November 12, 2009, to October 9, 2026.

==== Volumes ====
No.	Japanese release date	Japanese ISBN
1	November 12, 2009	978-4-09-122100-1
2	March 12, 2010	978-4-09-122225-1
3	August 12, 2010	978-4-09-122547-4
4	February 10, 2011	978-4-09-122737-9
5	August 12, 2011	978-4-09-123128-4
6	February 10, 2012	978-4-09-123478-0
7	August 10, 2012	978-4-09-123756-9
8	February 12, 2013	978-4-09-124117-7
9	August 12, 2013	978-4-09-124394-2
10	May 12, 2014	978-4-09-124594-6
11	September 12, 2014; September 10, 2014 (SE)	978-4-09-125189-3; 978-4-09-941840-3 (SE)
12	April 10, 2015	978-4-09-126028-4
13	January 12, 2016	978-4-09-127004-7
14	September 12, 2016	978-4-09-127388-8
15	April 12, 2017	978-4-09-127596-7
16	November 10, 2017	978-4-09-128012-1
17	June 12, 2018	978-4-09-128308-5; 978-4-09-943018-4 (SE)
18	February 12, 2019	978-4-09-128859-2
19	December 12, 2019	978-4-09-129463-0
20	September 11, 2020	978-4-09-129525-5
21	May 12, 2021	978-4-09-850566-1
22	February 10, 2022	978-4-09-851003-0
23	August 10, 2026	978-4-09-854761-6
24	October 9, 2026	978-4-09-854867-5

=== Anime ===
A 10-episode anime television series adaptation was announced in May 2014. The series is directed by Yūsuke Fujikawa, scripted by Natsuko Takahashi, with music composed by Masaru Yokoyama. The series aired on Fuji TV from July 12 to September 20, 2014. (Note: The series was broadcast on Fuji TV on Friday at 25:50, which is effectively Saturday at 1:50 a.m. JST.)

The series was streamed worldwide outside of Asia on Crunchyroll.

==== Episodes ====
No.	Title	Original release date
1	"Saburou Nobunaga" "Saburou Nobunaga" (サブロー信長)	July 12, 2014
2	"preparing to die in an effort to dissuade one's lord" "Kanshi" (諫死)	July 19, 2014
3	"Viper of Mino" "Mino no Mamushi" (美濃のマムシ)	July 26, 2014
4	"Battle of Okehazama" "Okehazama no Tatakai" (桶狭間の戦い)	August 2, 2014
5	"Love Letter" "Raburetaa" (らぶれたあ)	August 9, 2014
Saburou tries to take Mino by force and fails because of Inabayama castle. He's rejoined by Matsudaira Takechiyo the womanizer. Saburou is in need of a stratagem to scare Mino's people: Tokichirou comes up with the idea of building a fortress in one night. Saburou has also been sending letters to Mino's main retainers who then take Inabayama and side with Owari. Matsudaira changes his name to Tokugawa Ieyasu.
6	"Mitsuhide Akechi" "Akechi Mitsuhide" (明智光秀)	August 16, 2014
The original Nobunaga contacts Saburou and enters his service under the name of Akechi Mitsuhide while keeping his face hidden. Through his connections, they enter Kyoto to petition Ashikaga Yoshiaki to be the new shougun, and succeed, Mitsu taking care of the court formalities in place of Saburou. He also convinces Oichi to accept Saburou's proposal of marrying Azai to strengthen the Oda clan.
7	"Kill Nobunaga" "Nobunaga wo ute!" (信長を討て！)	August 23, 2014
Oichi, now married to Azai Nagamasa, has a daughter Chacha. Saburou names four generals: Shibata Katsuie, Niwa Nagahide, Mitsuhide and Tokichirou, who changes his name to Hashiba Hideyoshi for the occasion. Saburou orders Hideyoshi against the Asakura clan. Saburou meets Matsunaga Hisahide, also a time traveler. The shougun asks various daimyou to destroy Nobunaga: the Azai clan answers the call.
8	"An Unthinkable Betrayal" "Masaka no Uragiri" (まさかの裏切り)	August 30, 2014
After conquering Kanegasaki during the Asakura campaign, the Oda forces are facing a pincer manoeuvre due to the treacherous Azai who attacks from Oumi. Saburou quickly decides to retreat to Kyoto: Hideyoshi volunteers to lead the rear-guard so he can finally exact revenge on the Oda. But Mitsuhide and Takenaka Hanbei from Mino accompany Hideyoshi, which leaves him no choice but to fight valiantly.
9	"A Thorny Road" "Ibara no Michi" (イバラの道)	September 13, 2014
The Oda move out against Azai HQ, Odani Castle, but it's too well fortified so they target Yokoyama instead. Azai receives reinforcement led by Asakura Kagitake and sorties. Ieyasu's army comes to support Oda and defeats Asakura. Hideyoshi and Takenaka Hanbei win and occupy Yokoyama. Saburou goes to Settsu to subjugate the Miyoshi 3: he leaves the rear position of Usayama Castle in Mori Yoshinari's hands. Usayama is attacked by Asakura/Azai on their way to Kyoto. Mitsuhide is sent to Kyoto to strengthen their defense; Shibata handles the rear-guard of Settsu while the rest of Oda return to Usayama. Mori Yoshinari buys them time with his sacrifice. The Asakura/Azai army retreats to Enryaku Temple on Mount Hiei.
10	"Two Nobunagas" "Futari no Nobunaga" (二人の信長)	September 20, 2014
The younger sons of Mori Yoshinari become Saburou's pages (including Ranmaru), the eldest son Nagayoshi becoming a general. Saburou meets another time traveler who becomes his bodyguard Yasuke. Several targets are available for the campaign: Azai's Odani Castle, Ishiyama Hongan Temple (Osaka), the Takeda, Mount Hiei (Kyoto). On the counsel of Mitsuhide, Saburou picks the Enryaku Temple of Mount Hiei.

=== Drama ===
An 11-episode Japanese television drama was announced in May 2014. It stars Shun Oguri as Saburo and Nobunaga. It was broadcast on Fuji TV from October 13 to December 22, 2014.

=== Live-action film ===
A live-action film adaptation was announced in May 2014. It features the same cast from the television drama and premiered in Japan on January 23, 2016.

== Reception ==
As of February 2016, the manga had over 3.5 million copies in circulation. The series placed 10th on Kono Manga ga Sugoi!'s 2012 list of Top 10 Manga for Male Readers. In 2012, Nobunaga Concerto won the 57th Shogakukan Manga Award for the shōnen category. It was nominated for the 5th Manga Taishō Award in 2012, and ranked 3rd with 57 points.
