= Miyabe Keijun =

Japanese samurai

- 宮部継潤
- Born: 1528; Ōmi Province
- Died: April 20, 1599 (aged 70–71); Inaba Province
- Children: Miyabe Nagafusa
- Military career
- Allegiance: Azai clan Oda clan Toyotomi clan
- Rank: Sōhei
- Commands: Miyabe Castle; Tottori Castle
- Conflicts: Battle of Norada (1560); Siege of Kanegasaki (1570); Battle of Anegawa (1570); Siege of Odani Castle (1573); Kyushu Campaign (1587)

Miyabe Keijun (宮部継潤; 1528 – April 20, 1599) He was a Tendai monk from Mount Hiei in western Japan and Azai clan retainer. He was the father of Miyabe Nagafusa and became a reputable administrator under Toyotomi Hideyoshi during the latter half of the Sengoku period of feudal Japan. His name could also be read as Miyabe Tsugimasu.

Keijun received Miyabe Castle from Azai Nagamasa when he gave his support to the Azai clan. Fighting against the Oda clan during the Battle of Anegawa in 1570, Nagamasa and his counterpart Asakura Yoshikage were defeated, prompting Keijun to distrust his lord's ability, but not to the point in which he was willing to defect.

In 1573, Oda Nobunaga laid siege to the Azai clan's Sawayama Castle, which was held by Isono Kazumasa. The castle fell after a siege that lasted over three months. In response, Nagamasa took Kazumasa's elderly mother, who he held hostage in Odani Castle, to the execution grounds for death. Keijun became enraged at the backstabbing qualities of Nagamasa, he and Kazumasa defected to Nobunaga and assisted him in the downfall of the Azai.

As both Nagamasa and the Azai were entirely put into extinction after his defection, Keijun served under Nobunaga until the latter's death in 1582, at which time he then came to serve Toyotomi Hideyoshi, largely assisting him by means of administration and agricultural production. He supporting Hideyoshi by additionally taking part in the Kyūshū Campaign of 1587, Keijun fought in the majority of the battles and observed other conflicts—such as the Toyotomi attack upon Hyūga Province's Taka Castle.

Continuing his prowess in both Toyotomi agriculture and administration, throughout the years that passed, Hideyoshi rewarded Keijun with Tottori Castle of Inaba Province, which he passed on to his son in 1596, and retired from service as a Toyotomi administrator.
