= Miyabe =

Miyabe (written: 宮部) is a Japanese surname. Notable people with the surname include:

- Airi Miyabe (宮部 藍梨, born 1998), Japanese volleyball player
- Kingo Miyabe Japanese botanist
- Miyabe Keijun (宮部 継潤, 1528–1599), Japanese Tendai monk
- Miyuki Miyabe (宮部 みゆき, born 1960), Japanese writer
- Miyabe Nagafusa (宮部 長房, 1581–1634), Japanese samurai
- Shizue Miyabe (宮部 シズエ, born 1938), Japanese swimmer
- Yasunori Miyabe (宮部 保範, born 1966), Japanese speed skater
- Yukinori Miyabe (宮部 行範, 1968–2017), Japanese speed skater
