= Kaihō Tsunachika =

Japanese samurai

- 海北 綱親
- Born: 1535; Ōmi Province
- Died: 1573 (aged 37–38); Odani Castle
- Children: Kaihō Yūshō
- Military career
- Allegiance: Azai clan
- Rank: Azai-sanshō
- Nickname: "Zenemon"
- Conflicts: Battle of Norada (1560); Siege of Kanegasaki (1570); Battle of Anegawa (1570); Siege of Odani (1573)

Kaihō Tsunachika (海北 綱親; 1535 – 1573) was a Japanese samurai and commander of the Sengoku period who served Azai clan as a senior retainer. His son Kaihō Yūshō was a representative painter of the Azuchi–Momoyama period in Japan.

Tsunachika served as a senior retainer and military commissioner for three generations of the Azai clan. Together with Akao Kiyotsuna and Amenomori Kiyosada, Tsunachika was known as one of the "Three Generals of the Azai" (浅井三将, Azai-sanshō).

In 1573, Tsunachika is considered to have been killed in action when Oda Nobunaga attacked and toppled Odani Castle.
