= Odani =

Odani may refer to:

- Misako Odani (born 1976), Japanese singer, songwriter, and pianist
- Odani Castle, a castle in Kohoku in Shiga Prefecture, Japan

== See also ==
- Siege of Odani Castle, the last stand of the Azai clan in 1573
