= Masakazu =

Masakazu is a masculine Japanese given name. Notable people with the name include:

- Imafuku Masakazu (died 1582), Japanese samurai of the Sengoku period who served the Takeda clan
- Kobori Masakazu (1579–1647), artist and aristocrat in the reign of Tokugawa Ieyasu
- Masakazu Fujiwara (born 1981), Japanese long-distance runner who specializes in the marathon
- Masakazu Fukuda (1972–2000), Japanese professional wrestler
- Masakazu Imanari (born 1976), Japanese mixed martial arts fighter best known for his leglocks
- Masakazu Ishiguro (born 1977), Japanese manga artist
- Masakazu Ito (伊藤 雅和, born 1988), Japanese cyclist
- Masakazu Kagiyama (born 1971), Japanese figure skater who is now a coach
- Masakazu Katsura (born 1962), Japanese manga artist
- Masakazu Kawabe (1886–1965), general in the Imperial Japanese Army
- Masakazu Koda (born 1969), former Japanese football player
- Masakazu Kondō, Japanese shogi player
- Masakazu Konishi (1933–2020), Japanese biologist
- Masakazu Morita (born 1972), Japanese voice actor and actor
- Masakazu Nakai (1900–1952), Japanese aesthetician, film theorist, librarian, and social activist
- Masakazu Obara (小原 正和), Japanese anime director
- Masakazu Sekiguchi (born 1953), Japanese politician of the Liberal Democratic Party
- Shinagawa Masakazu (1544–1565), Japanese samurai of the Sengoku period who served the Mōri clan
- Masakazu Suzuki, retired Japanese football player and manager
- Masakazu Tamura (born 1943), Japanese film and theatre actor
- Masakazu Tashiro (born 1988), Japanese football player
- Masakazu Yoshizawa (1950–2007), Japanese American flautist and musician, known for his mastery of the shakuhachi
- Masakazu Watanabe, Japanese shogi player
- Masakazu Yamaguchi (山口 譲司), Japanese manga artist
- Masakazu Yamazaki (山崎 正和, 1934–2020), Japanese writer, literary critic and philosopher
