= Kuranosuke =

- Pronunciation: [kɯ.ɾa.no.sɯ̥.ke]
- Gender: Male

Origin
- Origin: Japanese
- Meaning: Deputy (次官, Suke) of the Kuraryō (内蔵寮), a historical financial agency within the Ministry of the Center (Note: The other high-ranking positions included the chief (内蔵頭, Kura no Kami), the third-in-command (内蔵允, Kura no Jō) and the fourth-in-command (内蔵属, Kura no Sakan). -nosuke ("deputy") and -nojō ("third-in-command") have become generic male name suffixes.)

Kuranosuke (written: 内蔵助, 倉之助, 庫之助 or 蔵之介) is a masculine Japanese given name. Notable people with the name include:

- Dodo Kuranosuke (百々 内蔵助; died 1560), Japanese daimyō
- Ōishi Yoshio (大石良雄; 1659–1703), Japanese chamberlain of the Ako Domain of the Harima Province in Edo Period alias Ōishi Kuranosuke (大石内蔵助)
- Jinbo Kuranosuke (神保 内蔵助; 1816–1868), Japanese samurai
- Kuranosuke Fujisawa (藤沢 庫之助; 1919–1993), Japanese Go player
- Nakamuta Kuranosuke (中牟田 倉之助; 1837–1916), Imperial Japanese Navy admiral
- Kuranosuke Sasaki (佐々木 蔵之介; born 1968), Japanese actor
