= Jun Hazumi =

Japanese voice actor (born 1934)

- Born: Shigetoshi Takahashi; July 14, 1934 (age 92); Tokyo, Japan
- Occupation: Voice actor
- Years active: 1960–present

Shigetoshi Takahashi (高橋茂敏, Takahashi Shigetoshi; born July 14, 1934), better known as his stage name Jun Hazumi (筈見純, Hazumi Jun), is a Japanese voice actor from Tokyo attached to Arts Vision. He was formerly attached to Production Baobab. His voice has been compared to those of Shinji Nakae and Gorō Naya.

== Filmography ==
=== Television animation ===
1960s

- Astro Boy (1963) – Captain
- Kimba the White Lion (1965) – Hurley
- Princess Knight (1967) – King Charcoalland
- Kamui the Ninja (1969) – Miwata

1970s

- New Star of Giants (1977) – Tatsuro Hirooka
- Lupin The Third Part II (1979) – Robert
- Monarch: The Big Bear of Tallac (1977) – Keryan
- Uchū Majin Daikengō (1978) – Dareth

1980s

- The Flying House (1982) – Jesus Christ
- Galactic Whirlwind Sasuraiger (1983) – John Anrock
- Special Armored Battalion Dorvack (1983) – Gordon
- Panzer World Galient (1984) – Dartath

1990s

- Future GPX Cyber Formula (1991) – Gavane
- Trapp Family Story (1991) – Kurt Schuschnigg
- H2 (1995) – Kantoku Shiroyama
- Jura Tripper (1995) – King Ariharis
- Eat-Man (1997) – Sadler

2000s

- Star Ocean: The Second Story (2001) – Harvest
- Kino's Journey (2003) – Kino's father
- Zatch Bell! (2003) – Li-en's father
- Mushishi (2005) – Ayako's father

2010s

- Nobunaga Concerto (2014) – Isono Kazumasa

=== OVA ===
- Patlabor (1988) – Kiyoteru Kai
- Mobile Suit Gundam 0080: War in the Pocket (1989) – Ems Izuruha
- Legend of the Galactic Heroes (1991) – Oskar von Reuenthal's father
- Mobile Suit Gundam 0083: Stardust Memory (1991) – Dick Allen (second episode)
- DNA² (1995) – Mori
- The Silent Service (1995) – Terrence B. Carver
- Ninja Resurrection (1998) – Toda Godayu

=== Theatrical animation ===
- Final Yamato (1983) – EDF Officer
- Doraemon: Nobita's Dorabian Nights (1991) – Harun al-Rashid
- Crayon Shin-chan: Pursuit of the Balls of Darkness (1997) – Hexon
- Sword of the Stranger (2007) – Zekkai
- Death Billiards (2013) – Elderly Man

=== Video games ===
- Tales of Rebirth (2004) – Randgriz

=== Dubbing roles ===
==== Live-action ====
- 48 Hrs. (1990 NTV edition) – Captain Haden (Frank McRae)
- Air America – Senator Davenport (Lane Smith)
- Batman – Harvey Dent (Billy Dee Williams)
- Battle of the Commandos (1975 NTV edition) – Pvt. Raymond Stone (Robert Hundar)
- Bill & Ted's Excellent Adventure – Sigmund Freud (Rod Loomis)
- Bulletproof – Capt. Will Jensen (James Farentino)
- Capricorn One (1981 TV Asahi edition) – Lt. Col. Peter Willis (Sam Waterston)
- Clear and Present Danger – Jim Greer (James Earl Jones)
- Dawn of the Dead (1980 TV Tokyo edition) – Sidney Berman (David Early)
- Die Hard (Broadcasting Inflight edition) – Hans Gruber (Alan Rickman)
- Extreme Justice – Captain Shafer (Ed Lauter)
- The French Connection – Laserdisc edition) – Pierre Nicoli (Marcel Bozzuffi)
- Hellraiser (1990 TV Tokyo edition) – Pinhead (Doug Bradley)
- Houston Knights – Mikey (Richard Bright)
- JFK – Guy Banister (Ed Asner)
- Mac and Me – Wickett (Martin West)
- No Way Out – David Brice (Gene Hackman)
- North to Alaska – Frankie Canon (Ernie Kovacs)
- The Running Man (1990 TV Asahi edition) – Fireball (Jim Brown)
- Scarface (1991 TV Tokyo edition) – Mel Bernstein (Harris Yulin)
- Star Trek V: The Final Frontier – Captain James T. Kirk (William Shatner)
- Star Trek VI: The Undiscovered Country – General Chang (Christopher Plummer)
- Star Wars Episode V: The Empire Strikes Back (1980 Movie theater edition) – General Veers (Julian Glover)
- Star Wars Episode V: The Empire Strikes Back (1986 NTV edition) – Admiral Piett (Kenneth Colley)
- They Live (1990 TV Asahi edition) – Gilbert (Peter Jason)
- Tomorrow Never Dies – Admiral Roebuck (Geoffrey Palmer)
- The Unseen – Tony Ross (Douglas Barr)
- V (1988 NTV edition) – Martin Philip (Frank Ashmore)
- Wall Street (1992 TV Asahi edition) – Trader (Oliver Stone)
- The Way of the Dragon – Jimmy (Unicorn Chan)

==== Animation ====
- Batman: The Animated Series – Roland Daggett
- Darkwing Duck – Negaduck
- Howard the Duck (1990 Fuji TV edition) – Doctor Jenning/The Dark Overlord
- Yogi Bear – Ranger Smith
