= Kaihō Yūshō =

Japanese painter (1533–1615)

Kaihō, Yūshō Shōeki
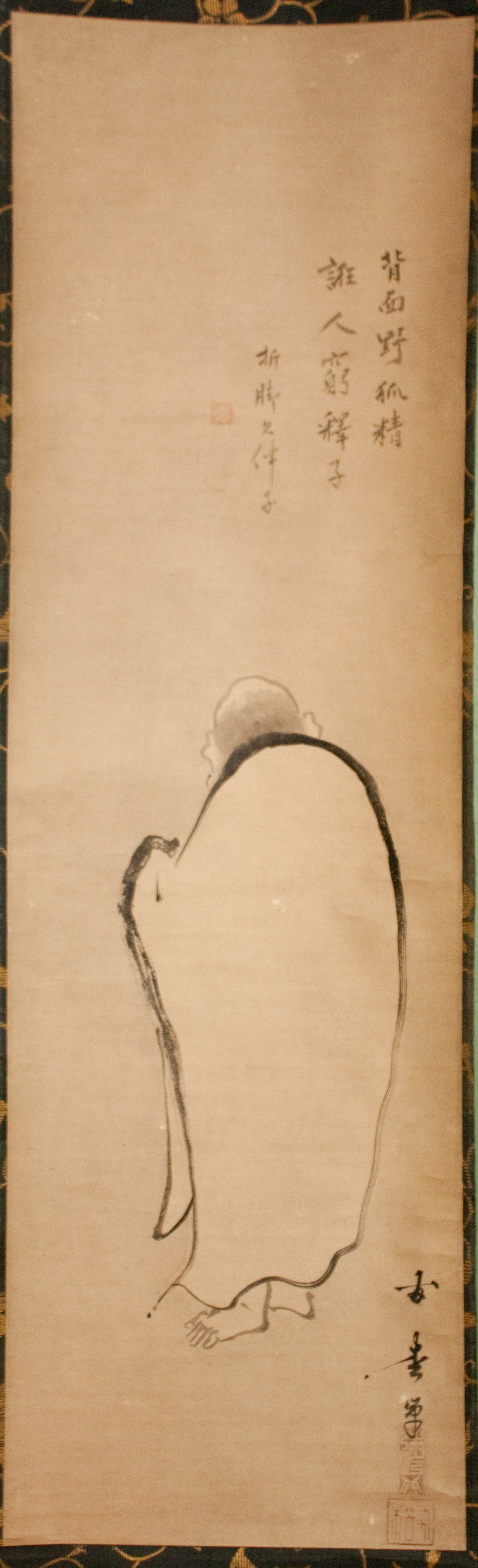
- Painting of Daruma by Kaihō Yūshō
- Born: 1533
- Died: 1615 (aged 81–82)
- Patrons: Toyotomi Hideyoshi, Emperor Go-Yōzei

Kaihō Yūshō (海北 友松; 1533–1615); real name: Kaiho Shōeki, "brush name": Yusho (alternative names: Josetsusai, Yūkeisai, Yūtoku), was a Japanese painter of the Azuchi–Momoyama period. He was born in Ōmi province, the fifth son of Kaihō Tsunachika, a vassal of Azai Nagamasa.

== Biography ==
Born into a military family, he became a page at the Tōfuku-ji (temple) when he moved to Kyōto and, later a lay priest. He served there under the abbot and associated with the leading Zen priests of Kyōto. In his forties, Yūshō turned to painting and became a pupil in the Kanō School, either under the famous Kanō Motonobu or his grandson Kanō Eitoku. Then, he worked at Jurakudai, under the patronage of Toyotomi Hideyoshi and the Emperor Go-Yōzei.

At first, he patterned his work after Song painter Liang Kai, doing only monochrome ink paintings, using a "reduced brush stroke" (gempitsu), relying more on ink washes than sharp hard strokes. Later, he worked in fashionable rich colors and gold leaf. Artistically on a level with Hasegawa Tōhaku and Kanō Eitoku, he gave his name Kaihō to the style of painting he and his followers practiced.

He acquired fame during his lifetime and his patrons included Toyotomi Hideyoshi and the emperor Go-Yōzei.

As of the Metropolitan Museum of Art exhibition of 1975, most of the artist's extant works were ink paintings produced during his late sixties for the Zen temple Kennin-ji in Kyoto.

== Important Cultural Property status ==
Several of Yūshō's works have been designated as Registered Important Cultural Property. Among these are the following:

- Landscape, 1599. Two hanging scrolls, ink on paper. Located in Kennin-ji, Kyoto, Japan
- Plum and pine, around 1599. Four sliding doors, ink on paper. Located in Zenkyō-an (Kennin-ji), Kyoto, Japan (See detail in "Oiseaux sur une branche de pin" in gallery below.)
- The four accomplishments, late 16th century. Pair of six-fold screens, ink and light color on paper. Located in Reitō-in (Kennin-ji), Kyoto, Japan

== Gallery ==
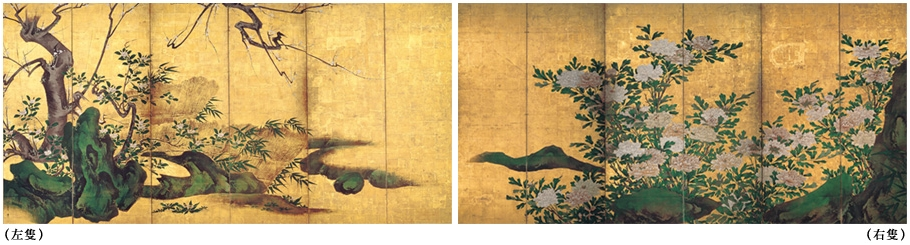
Flowers by Kaiho Yusho

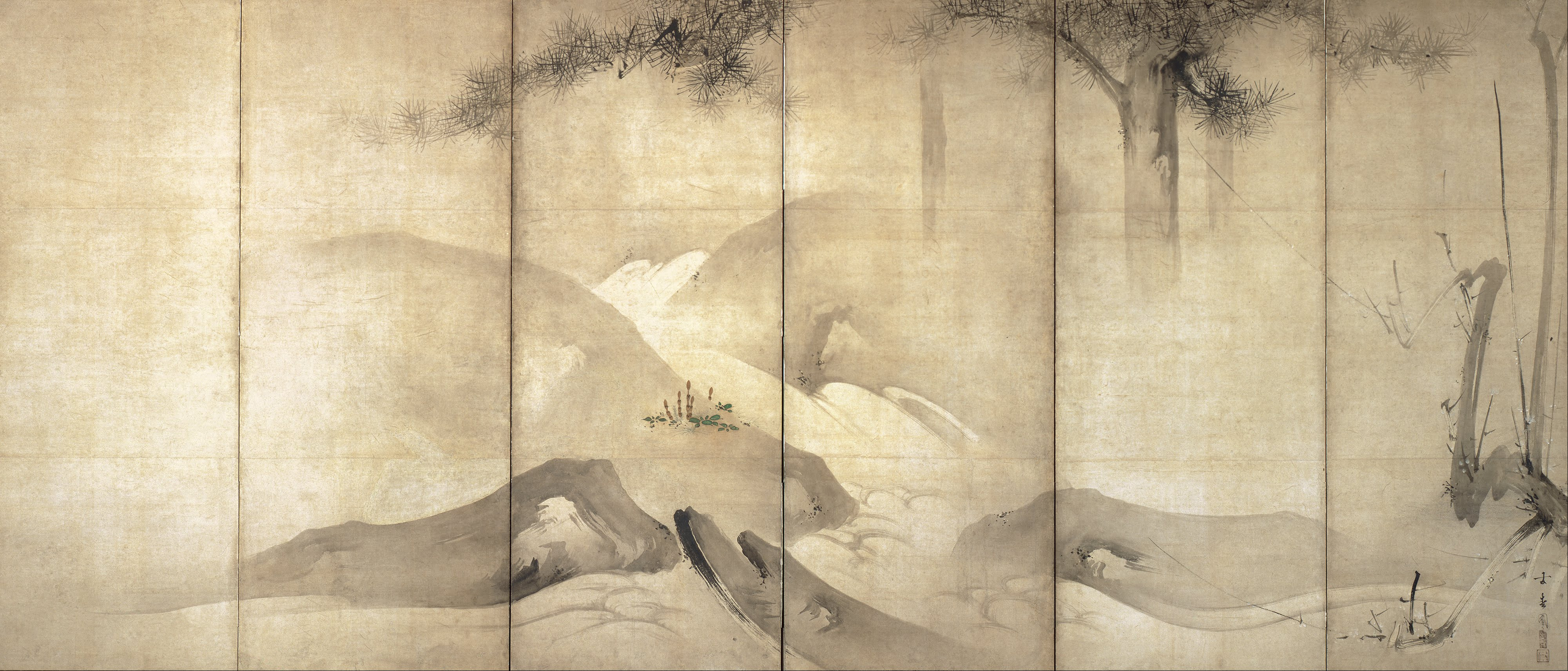
Kaihô Yûshô - Pine and Plum by Moonlight - Google Art Project

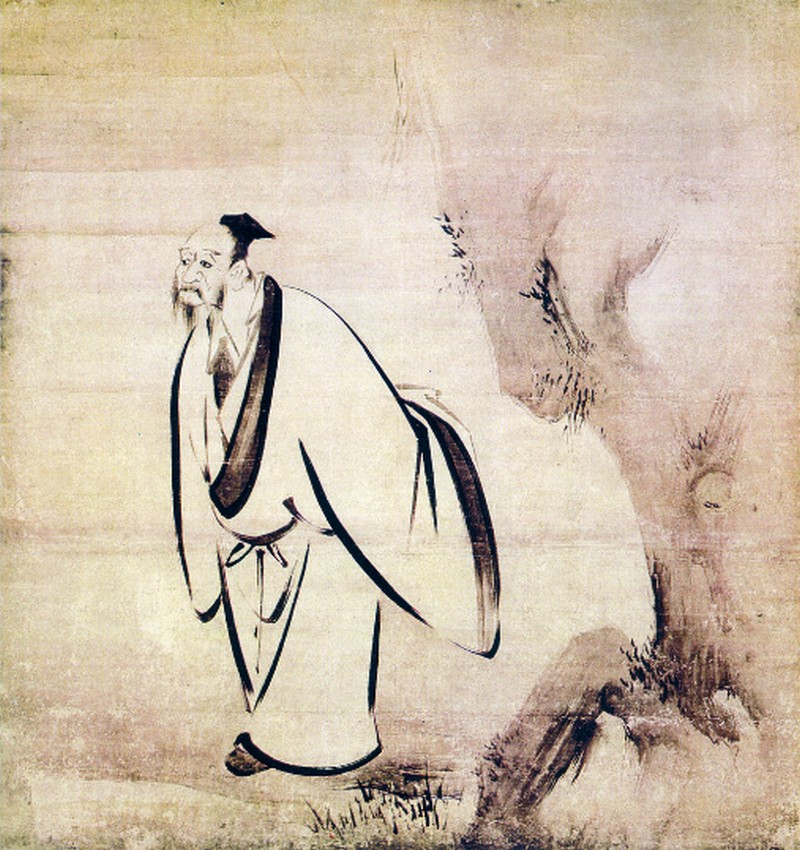
L'un des sept sages (1533-1615) par le peintre japonais Kaihō Yūshō

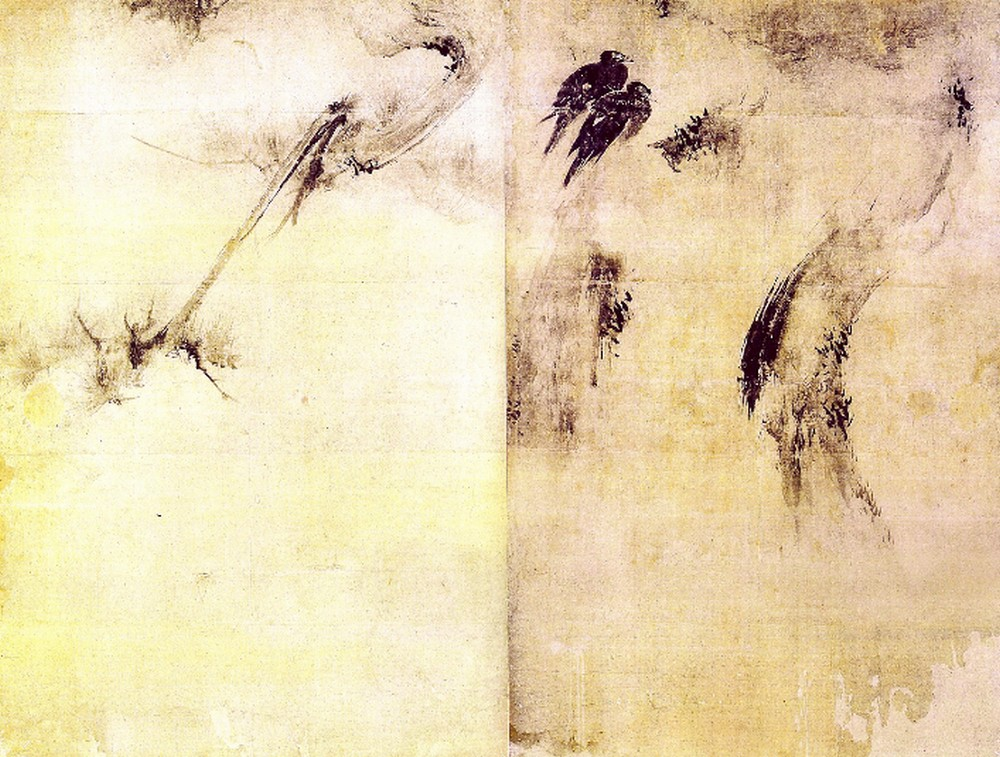
Oiseaux sur une branche de pin (1533-1615) par le peintre japonais Kaihō Yūshō

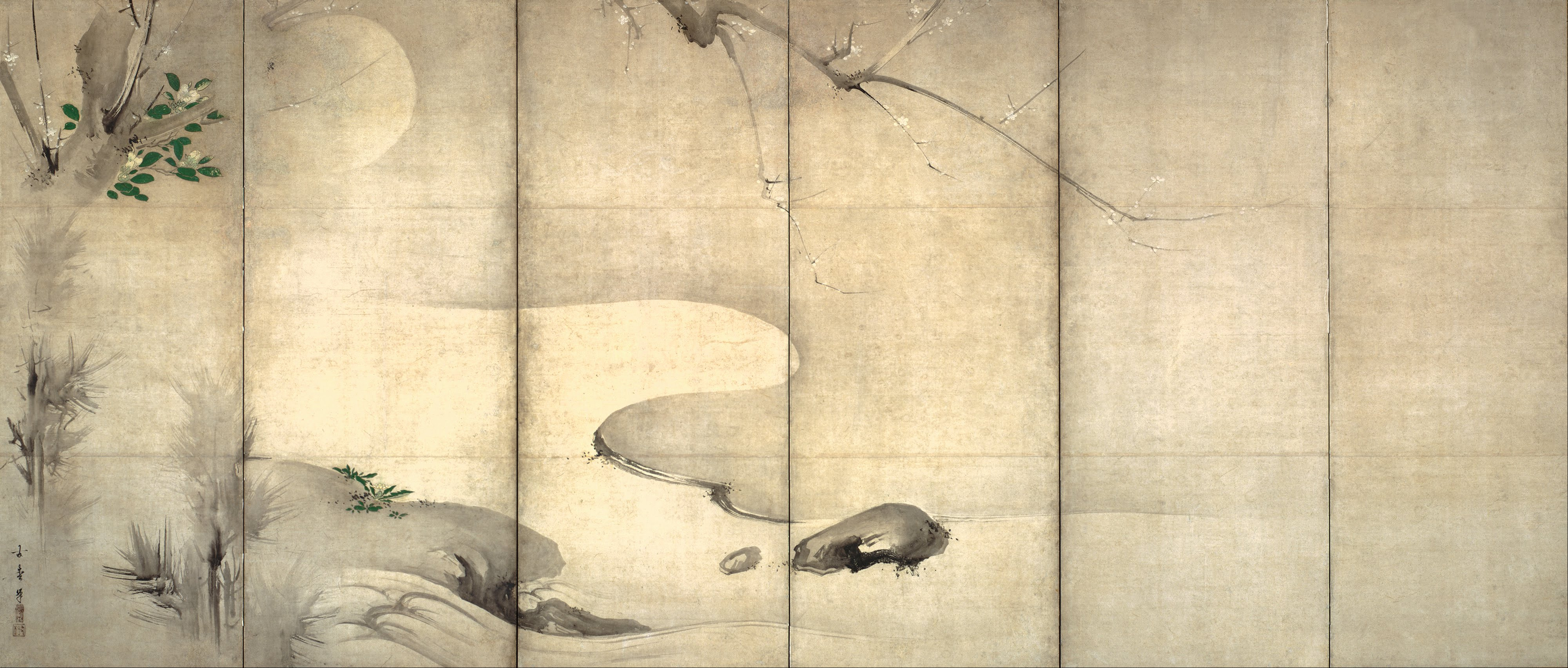
Kaihô Yûshô - Pine and Plum by Moonlight - Google Art Project (399082)
