= Akio Nojima =

Japanese voice actor (born 1945)

- 野島 昭生
- Born: April 6, 1945 (age 81); Nishitokyo, Tokyo, Japan
- Occupations: Actor; voice actor; narrator
- Years active: 1963–present
- Agent: Sigma Seven
- Height: 168 cm (5 ft 6 in)
- Children: Hirofumi Nojima; Kenji Nojima; Satoshi Nojima

Akio Nojima (野島 昭生, Nojima Akio; born April 6, 1945) is a Japanese actor, voice actor and narrator from Nishitokyo. His sons, Hirofumi Nojima and Kenji Nojima, are voice actors and his other son Satoshi is a nature writer. He was formerly affiliated with Tokyo Actor's Consumer's Cooperative Society and is attached to Sigma Seven as of 2016. He is most known for the roles of Saga in Saint Seiya and the Japanese voice of KITT in Knight Rider.

== Filmography ==
=== Television animation ===
- Akakichi no Eleven (1970) – Saizou Yashima
- Andersen Stories (1971) – Prince (The Little Mermaid)
- Sarutobi Ecchan (1971) – Taihei Tenka
- Mechander Robo (1977) – Ryousuke Shikishima
- Invincible Super Man Zambot 3 (1977) – Ichitarō Jin
- Rascal the Raccoon (1977) – Carl
- Shin Kyojin no Hoshi (1977) – Koichi Tabuchi
- Kagaku Bōkentai Tansar 5 (1979) – Daichi Akai
- The Rose of Versailles (1979) – Bernard Châtelet
- Dogtanian and the Three Muskehounds (1981) – Aramis; Athos
- Queen Millennia (1981) - Colonel Geran; Genjirou Amamori; Man in Trench Coat
- God Mars (1981) – Gasshu
- Ochamegami Monogatari Korokoro Poron (1982) – Apollon
- Akū Daisakusen Srungle (1983) – Captain Jance
- Armored Trooper Votoms (1983) – Aaron Schmittel
- Iga no Kabamaru (1983) – Maijima
- Fushigi na Koala Blinky (1984) – Erimaki-Tokage
- Katri, Girl of the Meadows (1984) – Teemu Räikkölä
- Magical Fairy Persia (1984) – Hideki Hayami
- Saint Seiya (1986) – Gemini Saga (good side)
- Rurouni Kenshin (1996) – Han'nya
- Turn A Gundam (1999) – Sid Munzer
- Mao-chan (2002) – Rikushirō Onigawara
- Angel Heart (2005) – Makimura's father
- Emma: A Victorian Romance (2005) – Richard Jones
- Le Chevalier D'Eon (2006) – D'Eon Elder
- Darker than Black (2007) – Decade
- Shigofumi: Letters from the Departed (2008) – Tatsumi Nojima
- Time of Eve (2008) – Atsurou Masaki (ONA and film)
- Shakugan no Shana III Final (2011) – Samuel Demantius
- Eureka Seven AO (2012) – Alexander Boyd
- Yuyushiki (2013) – God (Snowflake) (ep. 6)
- Kill la Kill (2013) – Mitsuzō Soroi
- Nobunaga Concerto (2014) – Azai Hisamasa
- Invaders of the Rokujouma!? (2014) – Yūichirō Satomi
- Ajin: Demi-Human (2016) – Hashiguchi
- Tomica Bond Combination Earth Granner (2021) – White Eagle
- Blade Runner: Black Lotus (2021) – Doctor M

=== OVA ===
- Legend of the Galactic Heroes Gaiden (2000) – Herxheimer

=== Theatrical animation ===
- Detective Conan: The Private Eyes' Requiem (2006) – Souichiro Miyama

=== Tokusatsu ===
- Inazuman Flash (????) – Magnet Desper
- Akumaizer 3 (????) – Kasadoler, Komainurn
- Himitsu Sentai Gorenger (1975) – Diamond Masked、Bird (ep. 43), Talon Masked (ep. 47)
- Tensou Sentai Goseiger (2010) – Zuteramedorop Alien Abauta of the Research (ep. 7)

=== Games ===
- Final Fantasy XII (2006) – Marquis Halim Ondore IV
- Wild Arms: The 4th Detonator (2005) – Augst
- Final Fantasy XIV:Shadowbringers (2019) – Ran'Jit

=== Drama CDs ===
- Aisaresugite Kodoku series 2: Itoshisugita Shifuku (????) – Masaaki Izu
- Answer Series 1: Answer (????) – Kamata-buchou

=== Dubbing ===
==== Live-action ====
- Robert De Niro
  - The Intern – Ben Whittaker
  - Joy – Rudy Mangano
  - Dirty Grandpa – Richard Kelly
  - Joker – Murray Franklin
- The Admiral: Roaring Currents – Takatora Tōdō (Kim Myung-gon)
- Airplane! (1983 TBS edition) – Ted Striker (Robert Hays)
- The Alamo – Davy Crockett (Billy Bob Thornton)
- America's Sweethearts – Lee Phillips (Billy Crystal)
- American Graffiti (1984 TBS edition) – Curt Henderson (Richard Dreyfuss)
- A Better Tomorrow – Ken (Kenneth Tsang)
- Beverly Hills Cop (1988 TV Asahi edition) – Billy Rosewood (Judge Reinhold)
- The Big Brawl – Robert
- Blood & Treasure – Jay Reece (John Larroquette)
- The Bodyguard – Old Man #3 (Tsui Hark)
- Chain Reaction (1999 TV Asahi edition) – FBI Agent Doyle (Kevin Dunn)
- Chariots of Fire (1985 TBS edition) – Harold Abrahams (Ben Cross)
- Cliffhanger (1997 NTV edition) – Hal Tucker (Michael Rooker)
- CSI: Crime Scene Investigation – Gil Grissom (William Petersen)
- The Curse of La Llorona – Father Perez (Tony Amendola)
- Dying Young – Gordon (Vincent D'Onofrio)
- Emma – Mr. Woodhouse (Bill Nighy)
- Eternal Sunshine of the Spotless Mind – Howard Mierzwiak (Tom Wilkinson)
- Fast Times at Ridgemont High – Brad Hamilton (Judge Reinhold)
- Final Destination – Agent Weine (Daniel Roebuck)
- Ghostbusters – Ed Mulgrave (Ed Begley Jr.)
- Ghostbusters II (1998 TV Asahi edition) – Peter Venkman (Bill Murray)
- Glengarry Glen Ross – John Williamson (Kevin Spacey)
- The Great Escape II: The Untold Story – Lieutenant Mike Corey (Anthony Denison)
- Home Alone (1998 TV Asahi edition) – Peter (John Heard)
- Home Alone: The Holiday Heist – Sinclair (Malcolm McDowell)
- Iron Sky: The Coming Race – Wolfgang Kortzfleisch / Vril Adolf Hitler (Udo Kier)
- Jappeloup (2021 BS TV Tokyo edition) – Serge Durand (Daniel Auteuil)
- Jason Bourne (2022 BS Tokyo edition) – Richard Webb (Gregg Henry)
- King's War – Liu Bang (Chen Daoming)
- Knight Rider – KITT
- Last Vegas – Sam Harris (Kevin Kline)
- The Long Kiss Goodnight – Luke Daedalus (David Morse)
- Lost Girl – Fitzpatrick "Trick" McCorrigan (Rick Howland)
- Master with Cracked Fingers – Lung's Father (Tien Feng)
- The Mermaid – Uncle Rich (Tsui Hark)
- Morgan – Dr. Alan Shapiro (Paul Giamatti)
- Next Stop, Greenwich Village – Robert (Christopher Walken)
- The Platform – Trimagasi (Zorion Eguileor)
- Pleasantville – Big Bob (J. T. Walsh)
- Project A – Inspector Hong Tin-Tzu (Yuen Biao)
- Rear Window (2012 Blu-Ray edition) – Tom J. Doyle (Wendell Corey)
- The Recruit – Dennis Slayne (Karl Pruner)
- Red Heat (1990 TV Asahi edition) – Lieutenant Charlie Stobbs (Larry Fishburne)
- RRR – Governor Scott Buxton (Ray Stevenson)
- Rush Hour 2 – Ricky Tan (John Lone)
- Safe House (2018 BS Japan edition) – Harlan Whitford (Sam Shepard)
- Serpico (1977 TV Asahi edition) – Bob Blair (Tony Roberts)
- Seven Golden Men Strike Again (1975 TV Asahi edition) – Aldo (Gabriele Tinti)
- Spy Game – Chuck Harker (Stephen Dillane)
- Stand by Me – Gordie Lachance (adult) (Richard Dreyfuss)
- Taboo – Brace (David Hayman)
- Taxi Driver (1981 TBS edition) – Tom (Albert Brooks)
- The Thing – Nauls (T. K. Carter)
- Top Gun (2005 DVD edition) – CDR Mike "Viper" Metcalf (Tom Skerritt)
- True Memoirs of an International Assassin (Netflix edition) – Amos (Ron Rifkin)
- U.S. Marshals (2001 TV Asahi/2004 TV Tokyo editions) – Cosmo Renfro (Joe Pantoliano)
- Valdez Is Coming – R.L. Davis (Richard Jordan)
- West Side Story (1979 TBS edition) – A-Rab (David Winters)
- What Dreams May Come – Dr. Christopher James Nielsen (Robin Williams)
- Wheels on Meals – Henry Matt (Herb Edelman)
- Wild Card – Baby (Stanley Tucci)
- X-Men (2003 TV Asahi edition) – Senator Robert Kelly (Bruce Davison)
- X2 (2006 TV Asahi edition) – Senator Robert Kelly (Bruce Davison)
- X-Men Origins: Wolverine – William Stryker (Danny Huston)
- The Young Master – Master Tien (Tien Feng)
- Youth – Mick Boyle (Harvey Keitel)
- Zhong Kui: Snow Girl and the Dark Crystal – Zhang Diaoxian (Winston Chao)

==== Animation ====
- Luca – Tommaso
- Robots – Crank Casey
- A Turtle's Tale: Sammy's Adventures – Grandpa Sammy
