= Isono Kazumasa =

Japanese Samurai

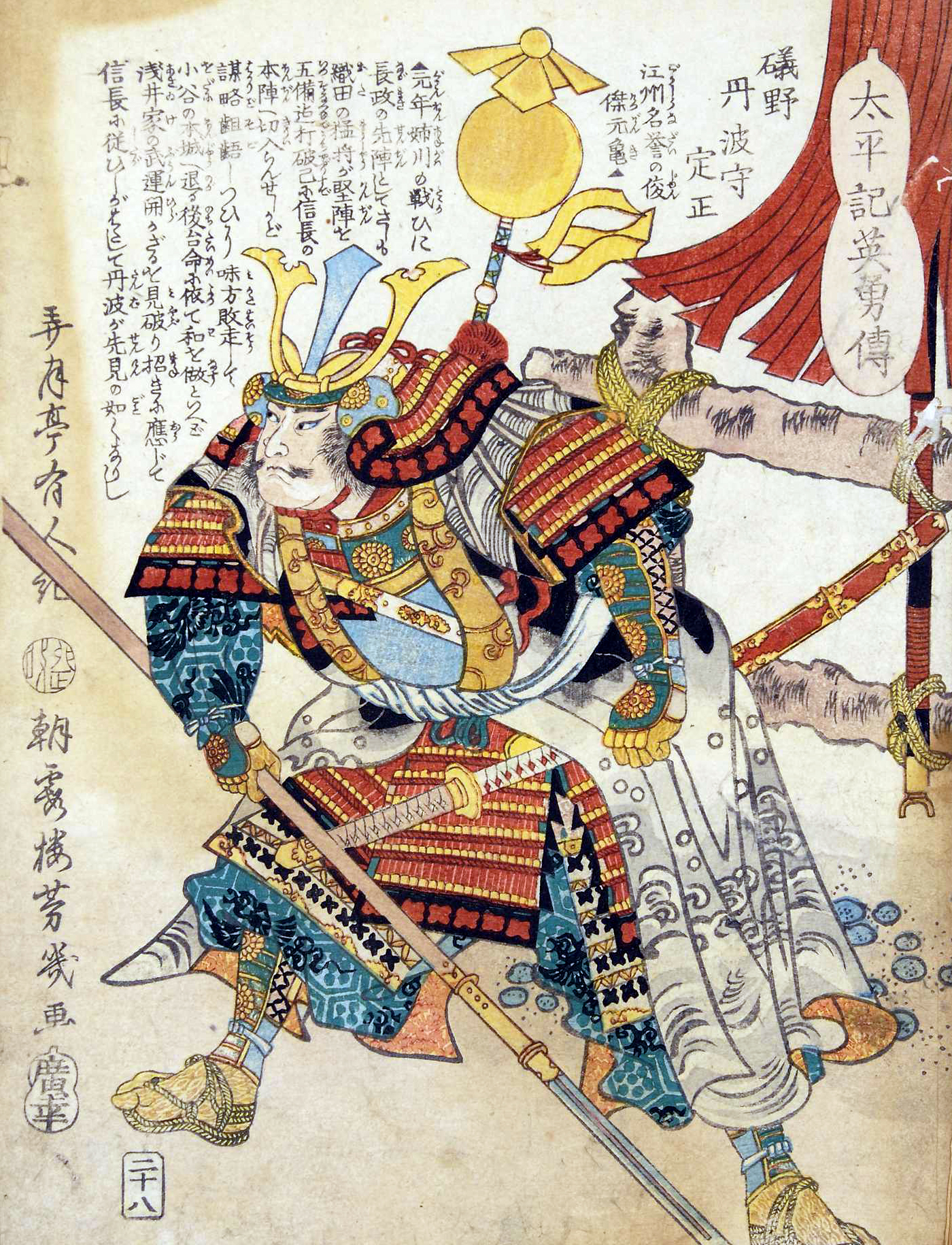
- Portrait of Isono Kazumasa from Utagawa Yoshiiku's Heroes of the Taiheiki
- Native name: 磯野 員昌
- Born: 1534
- Died: 1583
- Allegiance: Azai clan Oda clan
- Rank: commander
- Commands: Sawayama castle
- Battles / wars: Battle of Norada (1560); Siege of Kanegasaki (1570); Battle of Anegawa (1570); Siege of Sawayama Castle (1573); Siege of Odani Castle (1573)

Isono Kazumasa (磯野 員昌, 1534–1583) was a senior retainer of the Azai clan, later Oda clan and the castle lord in command of Sawayama castle.

In 1570, at the Battle of Anegawa, he fought against Oda forces who led by Sakai Masahisa and kill Masahisa son, Sakai Kyuzo.

In 1573, Oda Nobunaga laid siege to the Azai clan's Sawayama Castle, which was held by Kazumasa. The castle fell. In response, Azai Nagamasa took Kazumasa's elderly mother, who he held hostage in Odani Castle, to the execution grounds for death. Kazumasa became enraged to Nagamasa, then he defected to Nobunaga and became a vassal of the Oda clan, but later he became a priest in Mount Kōya.
