= Dodo Kuranosuke =

Dodo Kuranosuke (百々内蔵助, died 1560) was a Japanese samurai, and was a retainer of the Rokkaku clan until 1558, when he launched a rebellion against Rokkaku clan.

After he betrayed Rokkaku Yoshikata, and then fled to the safety of Sawayama Castle in present-day Shiga Prefecture, Honshu. Kuranosuke was besieged there, but held off every enemy attack until a force of ninja under Tateoka Doshun infiltrated and burnt the castle.

In 1560 his forces aided the Azai clan at the Battle of Norada against the Rokkaku. He fought his archenemy until the end, when he died in battle with them.
