= Battle of Norada =

1560 battle in Japan

- Part of the Sengoku period
Date	1560
Location	Hikone in Ōmi Province
Result	Azai victory

Belligerents
Azai clan	Rokkaku clan

Commanders and leaders
Azai Nagamasa; Akao Kiyotsuna; Endō Naotsune; Kaihō Tsunachika; Dodo Kuranosuke †; Kyōgoku Takayoshi	Rokkaku Yoshikata

Strength
11,000	25,000

The Battle of Norada (野良田の戦い) took place during Japan's Sengoku period between forces under Azai Nagamasa and Rokkaku Yoshikata in the year 1560.

Azai Nagamasa had previously been a retainer under the Rokkaku clan, and sought independence from the Rokkaku; Rokkaku Yoshikata meanwhile sought to consolidate his power through subjugation of the Azai.

== Battle ==
Rokkaku Yoshikata's force numbered 25,000 and outnumbered Azai Nagamasa's force by over two to one as it counted only 11,000. Both sides arrived on the battlefield unimpeded and even before engaging, Rokkaku troops defeated the army of Dodo Kuranosuke. After that easy skirmish, they believed they had already won the battle. Highly motivated under Nagamasa, his troops charged unintimidated and in the chaos of the battle, the Rokkaku force collapsed and retreated under heavy losses.

== Aftermath ==
The Azai clan ousted their defunct leader Azai Hisamasa, replacing him with Nagamasa. The Rokkaku clan fell into disarray with retainers questioning Yoshikata's rule; his strength weakened never to recover to its height.
