= Sakai Masahisa =

- 坂井 政尚
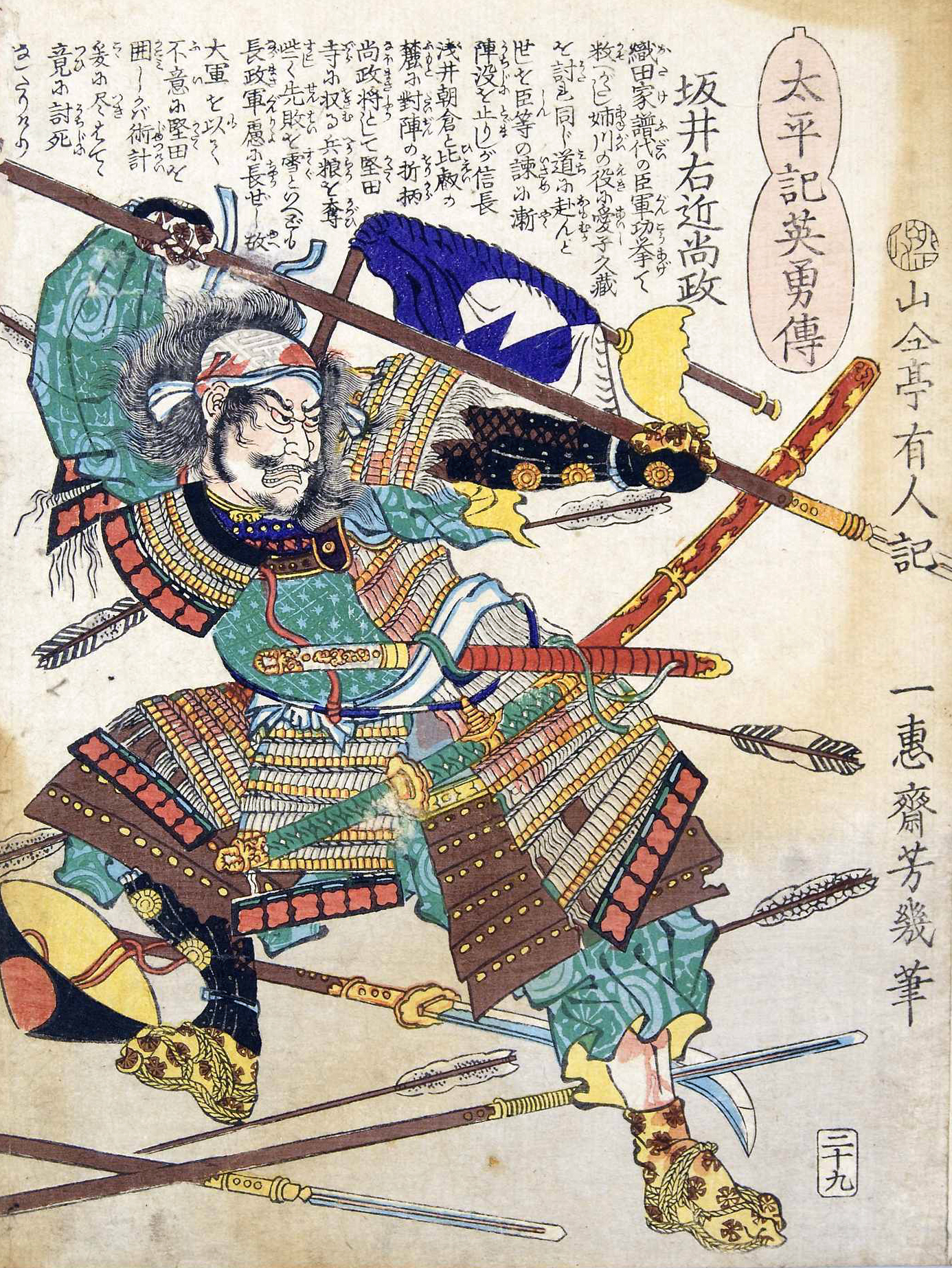
- Born: Mino province
- Died: November 26, 1573
- Children: Sakai Kyūzō
- Military career
- Allegiance: Saito clan Oda clan Toyotomi clan
- Conflicts: Siege of Inabayama; Siege of Shōryūji Castle; Battle of Anegawa; Siege of Odani Castle; Battle of Katada

Sakai Masahisa (坂井 政尚; died November 26, 1573) was a Japanese samurai of the Sengoku Period, who most notably served the Oda clan.

== Biography ==
Sakai was born in Mino Province, and first served the Saitō clan. After the fall of the Saitō, he was taken on as a retainer by Oda Nobunaga.

He was particularly active during the time of Oda Nobunaga's entry into Kyoto. In late 1568, Masahisa joined Shibata Katsuie, Hosokawa Fujitaka, Hachiya Yoritaka, and Mori Yoshinari in attacking Iwanari Tomomichi's Shōryūji Castle.

Later in 1570, at Battle of Anegawa while under attack from Asai forces under Isono Kazumasa, he lost his son Sakai Kyūzō.

Masahisa was also present at the Siege of Odani 1573. Masahisa died soon after, at the Battle of Katada. Family headship was thus inherited by his second son, Sakai Etchū no kami.
