= Miyabe Nagafusa =

Miyabe Nagafusa (宮部長房, 1581 - 1634) was the son of Miyabe Tsugimasu, succeeding to headship over the clan of Miyabe during the latter Sengoku period of feudal Japan. After his death he was given the name Miyabe Nagahiro (宮部長煕).
