= Endō Naotsune =

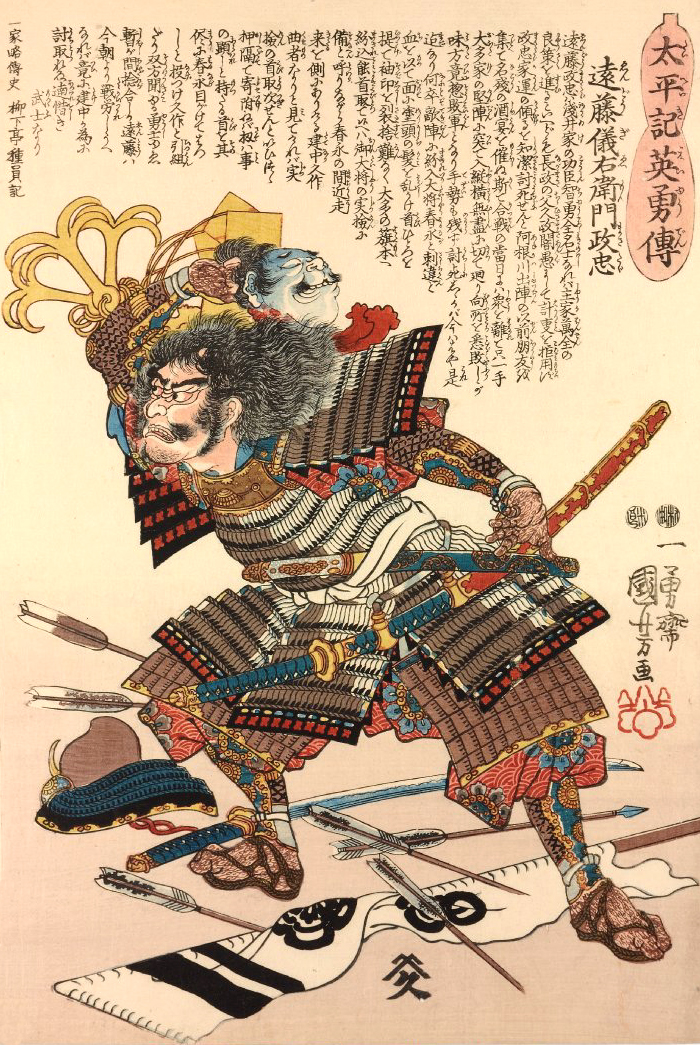
Portrait of Endō Naotsune from Utagawa Kuniyoshi's Heroes of the Taiheiki

Endō Naotsune (遠藤 直経; 1531 – August 9, 1570) was an officer under the Azai clan who was known as a fierce warrior during the Sengoku period of the 16th century of Japan.

Naotsune was opposed to the political marriage between his lord Azai Nagamasa and Oda Nobunaga's sister Oichi. During the Battle of Anegawa, Naotsune camouflaged his own men to resemble those of Nobunaga's, to infiltrate Nobunaga's army. Nobunaga became aware of Naotsune's intentions, and killed by Takenaka Kyusaku, younger brother of Takenaka Hanbei.

In 1569 he donated an illustrated poem to the Taga-taisha shrine, which still survives.
