= Siege of Odani Castle =

1573 siege in Japan

Siege of Odani
- Part of the Sengoku period
Date	October, 1573
Location	Odani Castle, Ōmi Province
Result	Oda clan victory: Azai clan destroyed

Belligerents
forces of Oda Nobunaga	forces of Azai Nagamasa

Commanders and leaders
Oda Nobunaga; Oda Nobutada; Gamō Ujisato; Isono Kazumasa; Miyabe Keijun	Azai Nagamasa †; Akao Kiyotsuna (executed); Kaihō Tsunachika †; Amenomori Kiyosada; Atsuji Sadayuki

The 1573 siege of Odani Castle (小谷城の戦い, Odani-jō no Tatakai) was the last stand of the Azai clan, one of Oda Nobunaga's chief opponents. and the first battle of Oda Nobutada.

== Prelude ==
In September, 1573, Oda Nobunaga defeated the Asakura clan at the siege of Ichijodani Castle. Later, the Oda forces returned to northern Ōmi, he defeated Isono Kazumasa, took Sawayama Castle and on October, 1573, Nobunaga began attacking Odani Castle, devastating the Azai clan.

== Siege ==
Nobunaga took Odani Castle from Azai Nagamasa, who, left with no other option, committed seppuku along with his father. Azai knew from the beginning that he would lose the battle, so he gave his wife Oichi (Nobunaga's sister), and their three daughters back to Nobunaga, saving them from death. Two of Nagamasa's daughters would later marry into powerful families. Their escape from the besieged castle became a fairly common sentimental scene in traditional Japanese art.

== Aftermath ==
Nagamasa suffered much the same fate as his comrade-in-arms Asakura Yoshikage, whose castle at Oda Nobunaga's siege of Ichijodani Castle was set aflame and destroyed.

== In popular culture ==
The siege of the castle and the late surrender is shown in the movie Sword for Hire, directed by Hiroshi Inagaki in 1952.

The battle has been featured in the game Samurai Warriors 2. In the game, however, both the Azai and Asakura clans are destroyed during the Odani siege. Historically, the Asakura clan was destroyed before the Azai at the Battle of Ichijodani.

== See also ==
- Battle of Anegawa
