= Battle of Anegawa =

1570 battle in Japan

- Part of Sengoku period
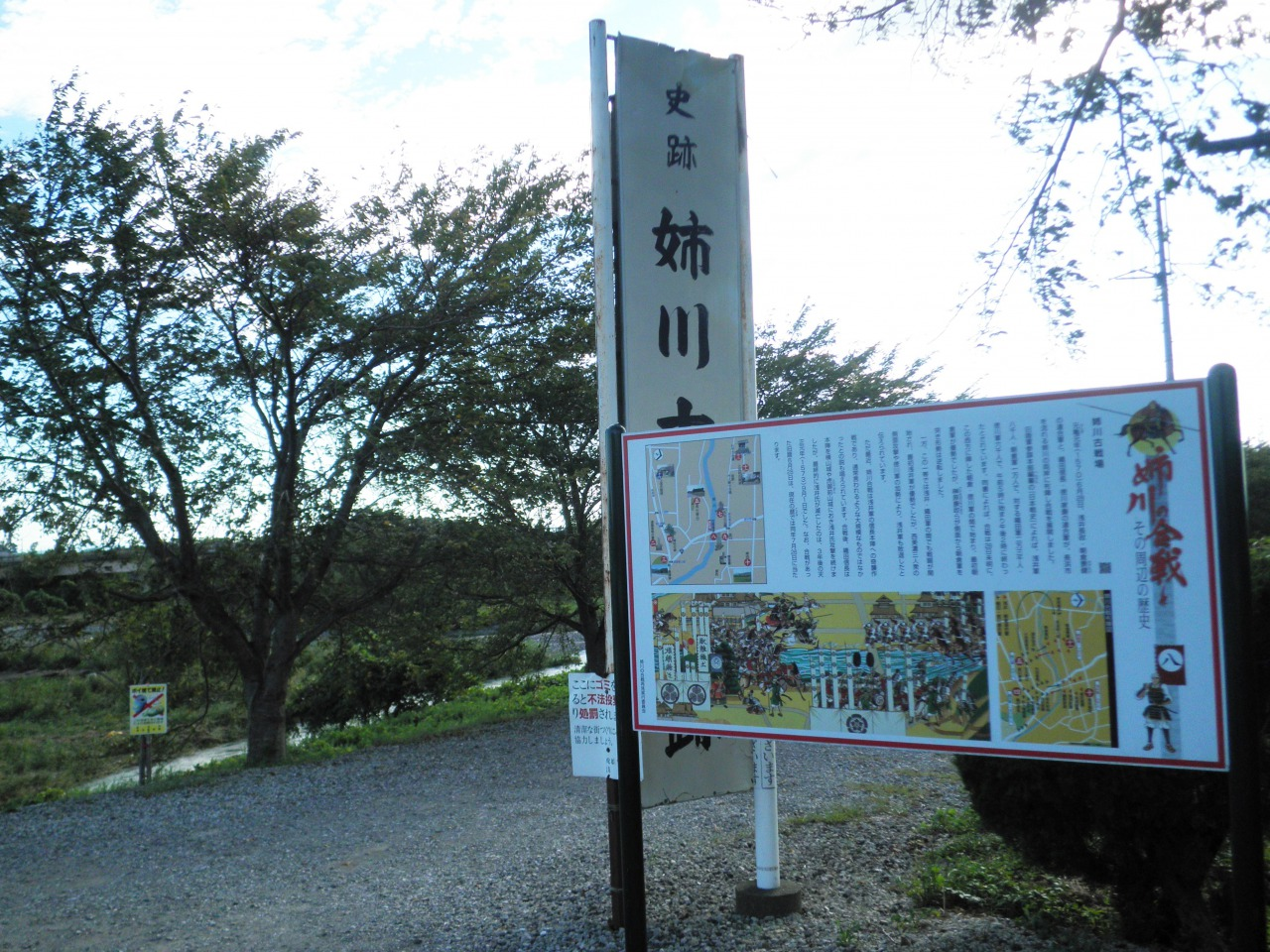
- Anegawa battle's site
Date	30 July 1570
Location	Ane River near Lake Biwa, Nagahama, Ōmi Province 35°24′58″N 136°19′20″E
Result	Oda–Tokugawa victory.

Belligerents
Oda clan Tokugawa clan	Azai clan Asakura clan

Commanders and leaders
Oda Nobunaga; Hashiba Hideyoshi; Sassa Narimasa; Inaba Yoshimichi Tokugawa Ieyasu; Ishikawa Kazumasa; Sakai Tadatsugu; Honda Tadakatsu; Sakakibara Yasumasa	Azai Nagamasa; Isono Kazumasa; Kaihō Tsunachika; Miyabe Keijun; Akao Kiyotsuna Asakura Yoshikage; Asakura Kagetake

Strength
28,000 total (23,000 Oda troops, plus 5,000 from Tokugawa Ieyasu)	18,000

Casualties and losses
800 killed	1,700 killed
- Location within Shiga Prefecture Battle of Anegawa (Japan)

The Sengoku period Battle of Anegawa (姉川の戦い, Anegawa no Tatakai) (30 July 1570) occurred near Lake Biwa in Ōmi Province, Japan, between the allied forces of Oda Nobunaga and Tokugawa Ieyasu, against the combined forces of the Azai and Asakura clans. It is notable as the first battle that involved the alliance between Nobunaga and Ieyasu, and it saw Nobunaga's prodigious use of firearms.

== Background ==
The battle came as an Azai and Asakura reaction to Oda Nobunaga's sieges of the castles of Odani and Yokoyama, which belonged to the Azai and Asakura clans. It was also referred to as the Battle of Nomura (野村合戦 Nomura Kassen) by the Oda and Azai clans and the Battle of Mitamura (三田村合戦 Mitamura Kassen) by the Asakura clan.

The Oda-Tokugawa allies marched on Odani castle, prompting Nagamasa to send for help from Echizen. Asakura Yoshikage sent an army to support him, and the combined Azai-Asakura force marched out to confront Nobunaga in the field. Nobunaga reacted by placing a screen around an Azai fort he had been reducing from Yokoyama castle and advancing to the southern bank of the Anegawa.

== Battle ==
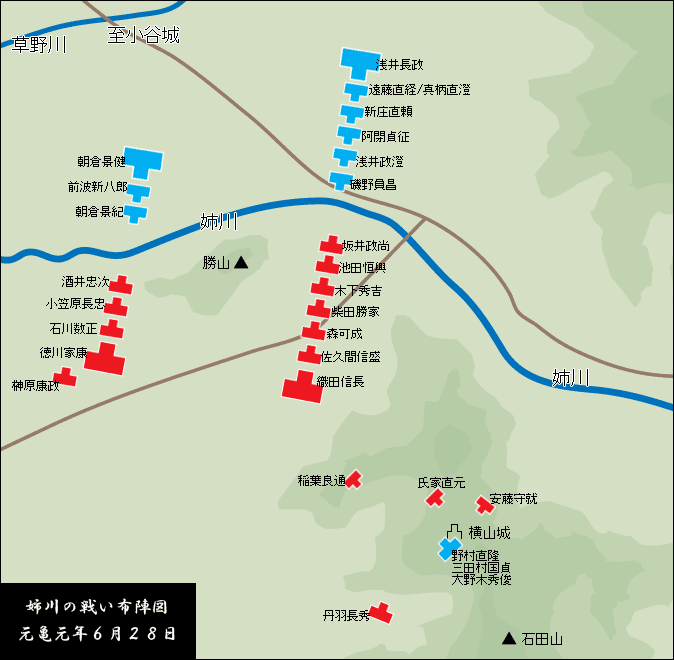
Blue: Azai (east) and Asakura (west). Red: Oda (east), Tokugawa (west), and Inaba (southeast)

The following morning on July 30, 1570 the battle began with the Oda and Azai clashing on the right while Tokugawa and Asakura grappled to the left. The battle turned into a melee fought in the middle of the shallow Ane River. For a time, Nobunaga's forces fought the Azai upstream, while the Tokugawa warriors fought the Asakura downstream.

Nobunaga assigned Hashiba Hideyoshi to lead troops into open battle for the first time, Sassa Narimasa led the rear guard, also with support from Hachisuka Masakatsu, Ikoma Ienaga, Kawajiri Hidetaka and Yamauchi Kazutoyo.

The Tokugawa forces formed the left wing of the Oda and Tokugawa alliance forces facing the Asakura forces, with formation as following:

- Ishikawa Kazumasa and Sakai Tadatsugu leading the vanguard units.
- Honda Tadakatsu and Sakakibara Yasumasa leading the rearguard units.

In this battle, Stephen Turnbull regarded Kazumasa, Tadatsugu, Yasumasa, and Tadakatsu, as Four Tokugawa Guardians. Ieyasu unleashed his second division under Tadakatsu and Yasumasa onto Asakura's left flank, surrounding Asakura Kagetake. It was recorded that at the beginning of this battle, as the Tokugawa army was being steadily pushed back by the Asakura army, Tadakatsu suddenly rode his horse and charged alone against the approaching 10,000-strong Asakura army. Seeing this, the panicked Ieyasu immediately led his forces to counter the advance of Asakura and to save Tadakatsu. In the end, they manage to defeat the Asakura army. Tadakatsu survived the battle despite the grave danger he faced.

There is also a report of single combat between Honda Tadakatsu against a giant Asakura warrior named Magara Naotaka, also known as Magara Jurozaemon. However, The duel was cut short when the Asakura army started to retreat. (Note: Daimon Watanabe, professor of Bukkyo University, and director of Japan institute of arts and culture stated this duel between Tadakatsu and Naotaka were much unconfirmed due to very few historical primary sources of the story.) Naotaka and his eldest son Magara Jurosaburo (Naomoto) covered the retreat of the Asakura army to the northern bank. Both were eventually killed when confronted by four Mikawa samurai, Kosaka Shikibu, Kosaka Gorojiro, Kosaka Rokurogoro, and Yamada Muneroku, and a fifth samurai named Aoki Jozaemon.

In another notable engagement, an Azai samurai named Endō Naotsune attempted to take Nobunaga's head but was stopped short by Takenaka Kyusaku, younger brother of Takenaka Hanbei. Another Oda samurai, Sakai Masahisa, was under attack from Azai forces under Isono Kazumasa, when he lost his son Sakai Kyūzō.

After the Tokugawa forces finished off the Asakura, they turned around and attacked the Azai's right flank by sending Tadakatsu and Yasumasa's units. The troops of Mino Triumvirate, who were under Inaba Ittetsu, were held in reserve, advancing to hit the Azai's left flank. They left the task of besieging Yokoyama castle to aid in the battle. The Azai and Asakura's forces were immediately defeated.

There is a battlefield memorial marker in Nomura-cho, Nagahama city, in Shiga Prefecture.

== Historical accounts ==
No reliable source exists to reconstruct the battle. The Battle of Anegawa is vividly presented in the books compiled in the middle or the end of the Edo period. Many of the stories are pure fiction. The only valuable source is the Shinchōkō-ki, describing it very briefly without any notes concerning tactics or details of the battle. The exact number of the casualties in this battle is unknown. However, the Shinchōkō-ki mentions 1,100 samurai from the Asakura clan being killed in battle. Yamashina Tokitsugu, who blindly believed in Nobunaga's propaganda, recorded clearly absurd numbers in his diary, stating "Azai 9,600, Asakura 5,000."

The 1901 publication "Japanese Military History: The Battle of Anegawa" estimates that the casualties on the Azai and Asakura side were around 1,700, while those on the Oda and Tokugawa side were around 800. According to A.L. Sadler in The Life of Shogun Tokugawa Ieyasu there were 3,170 heads collected by the Oda camp. A good portion were taken by Mikawa men, the Tokugawa force. The Mikawa Fudoki gives a very real picture of the battle: the retainers fighting in groups and the decapitation of soldiers in the confused mingling of armies among the clouds of smoke and dust. It is often noted that Nobunaga used 500 arquebusiers in this battle. He was famous for his tactical use of firearms but would find himself on the opposite end of skilled arquebus tactics in his Siege of Ishiyama Hongan-ji that year.

== Aftermath ==
Later in October 1570, the Asai and Asakura forces led by Asakura Kagetake, launch a counterattack in the Battle of Shimosakamoto, and retaliated by defeating an Oda army at the Usayama castle, near Otsu, in Ōmi Province. Kagetake's troops killed over 750 soldiers in the Oda army including Mori Yoshinari and Oda Nobuharu, one of Nobunaga's younger brothers.

== In popular culture ==
The battle has been featured in all games of the Samurai Warriors series. However, because Azai Nagamasa was made playable in Samurai Warriors 2, as opposed to the first game where he was a unique non-playable character, the battle had a larger significance. The battle has also fictionally appeared in revamped form in the Warriors Orochi series, in particular Warriors Orochi 3 where its most famous revamp takes place. It also a playable battle in the video game Kessen III. The battle is also featured in the game Nioh 2 as one of the pivotal events of the main story, which centers on the protagonist's role in the conquests of Oda Nobunaga and the Oda clan. The Battle of Anegawa is also featured in Total War: Shogun 2 as a historical battle, in which the player controls Tokugawa Ieyasu.

== Appendix ==
=== Bibliography ===
- The Battle of Anegawa on Samurai-archives.com
- De Lange, William. Samurai Battles: The Long Road to Unification. Toyp Press (2020) ISBN 978-949-2722-232
- Sadler, A.L. (1937). The Life of Shogun Tokugawa Ieyasu. Rutland: Charles E. Tuttle Co.
