= Sakai Kyuzo =

Sakai Kyūzō (坂井久蔵, 1555–1570) was a retainer of Oda Nobunaga and son of Sakai Masahisa. He fought his first battle at age thirteen, and then fought another battle at the Battle of Anegawa (1570).

In that battle, he was killed by gunfire. He is one of the samurai depicted in "Tales of Heroes of the Chronicles of the Great Peace", a series of woodblock prints by Utagawa Kuniyoshi. He is also depicted in Tsukioka Yoshitoshi's series "One Hundred Warriors".
