= Akao Kiyotsuna =

Japanese samurai

- 赤尾 清綱
- Born: 1514; Ōmi Province
- Died: September 1, 1573 (aged 58–59); Odani Castle
- Children: Akao Kiyofuyu
- Military career
- Allegiance: Azai clan
- Rank: Azai-sanshō
- Conflicts: Battle of Norada (1560); Siege of Kanegasaki (1570); Battle of Anegawa (1570); Siege of Odani (1573)

Akao Kiyotsuna (赤尾 清綱; 1514 – September 1, 1573) or Akao Mimisaka no Kami Kiyotsuna In 1573, Kiyotsuna was imprisoned after the fall of Odani Castle, and beheaded by Nobunaga. However, Nobunaga spared the life of Kiyotsuna's son, Akao Kiyofuyu.
