= Azai Sukemasa =

Daimyo of the Sengoku period

- Daimyo
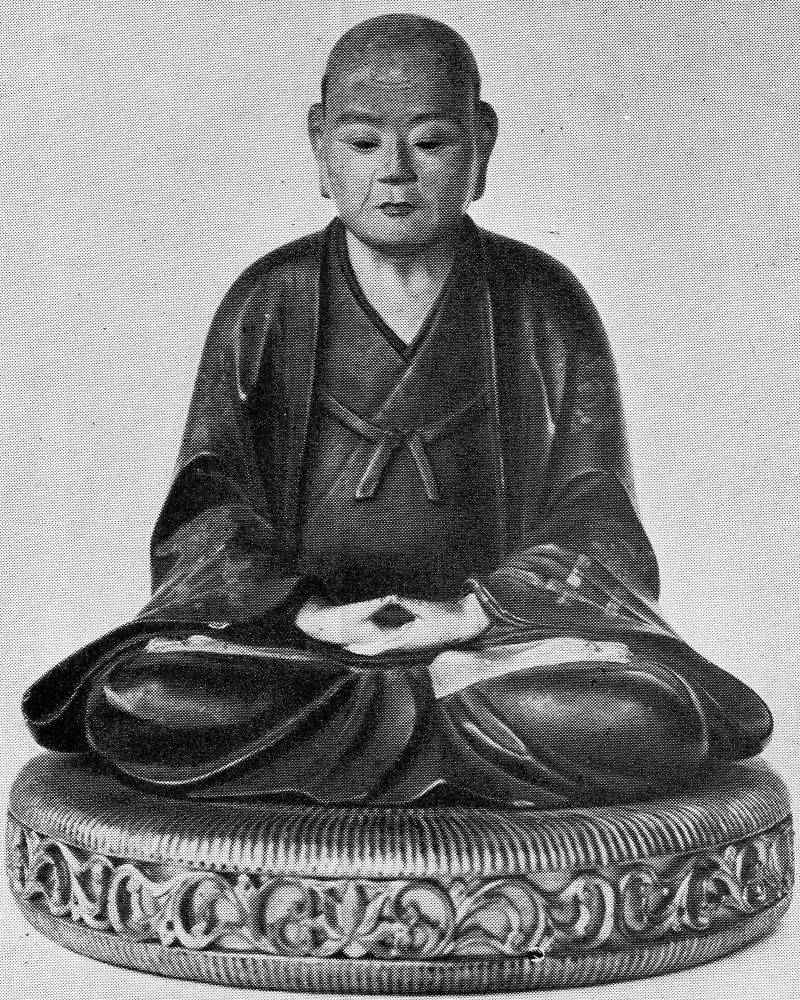
- Sculpture image of Azai Sukemasa
- Native name: 浅井 亮政
- Born: 1491
- Died: January 21, 1542 (aged 50–51)
- Family: Kyōgoku; Azai

Azai Sukemasa (浅井 亮政; 1491 – January 21, 1542) was the Sengoku era head of the Azai clan. Sukemasa was a retainer of the Kyōgoku clan but when the Kyōgoku clan declined for conflicts over the succession, the Azai clan came to power with Sukemasa as its daimyō.

After Sukemasa died, his son Azai Hisamasa became the head of the clan in 1542, but unlike his father, he was never a strong leader. Losing domains against Rokkaku clan, he instead became a Rokkaku retainer.
