= Imafuku Masakazu =

Imafuku Masakazu (今福 昌和; died 1582) was a Japanese samurai of the Sengoku period who served the Takeda clan. He was also known as Imafuku Ichizaemon-no-jō (今福市左衛門尉) and held the court title of Chikuzen no kami. Masakazu was the son of Imafuku Jōkansai (今福浄閑斎), the Takeda retainer who had built Kunōzan Castle and served as its warden. Masakazu's landholding, starting in 1563, was in the Suwa District of Shinano province. He was active under both Takeda Shingen and Shingen's son Katsuyori as a commander of infantry samurai-taishō (侍大将). He also served for a time as the warden of Takashima Castle. Masakazu was killed in 1582 while leading a counterattack against Kiso Yoshimasa, a former Takeda vassal who had turned traitor during the Tokugawa/Oda attacks on Shinano and Kai.
