= Azai Hisamasa =

Daimyo of the Sengoku period

Azai Hisamasa (浅井 久政, Azai Hisamasa, 1526 – September 23, 1573) was a son of Azai Sukemasa and the second head of the Azai clan.

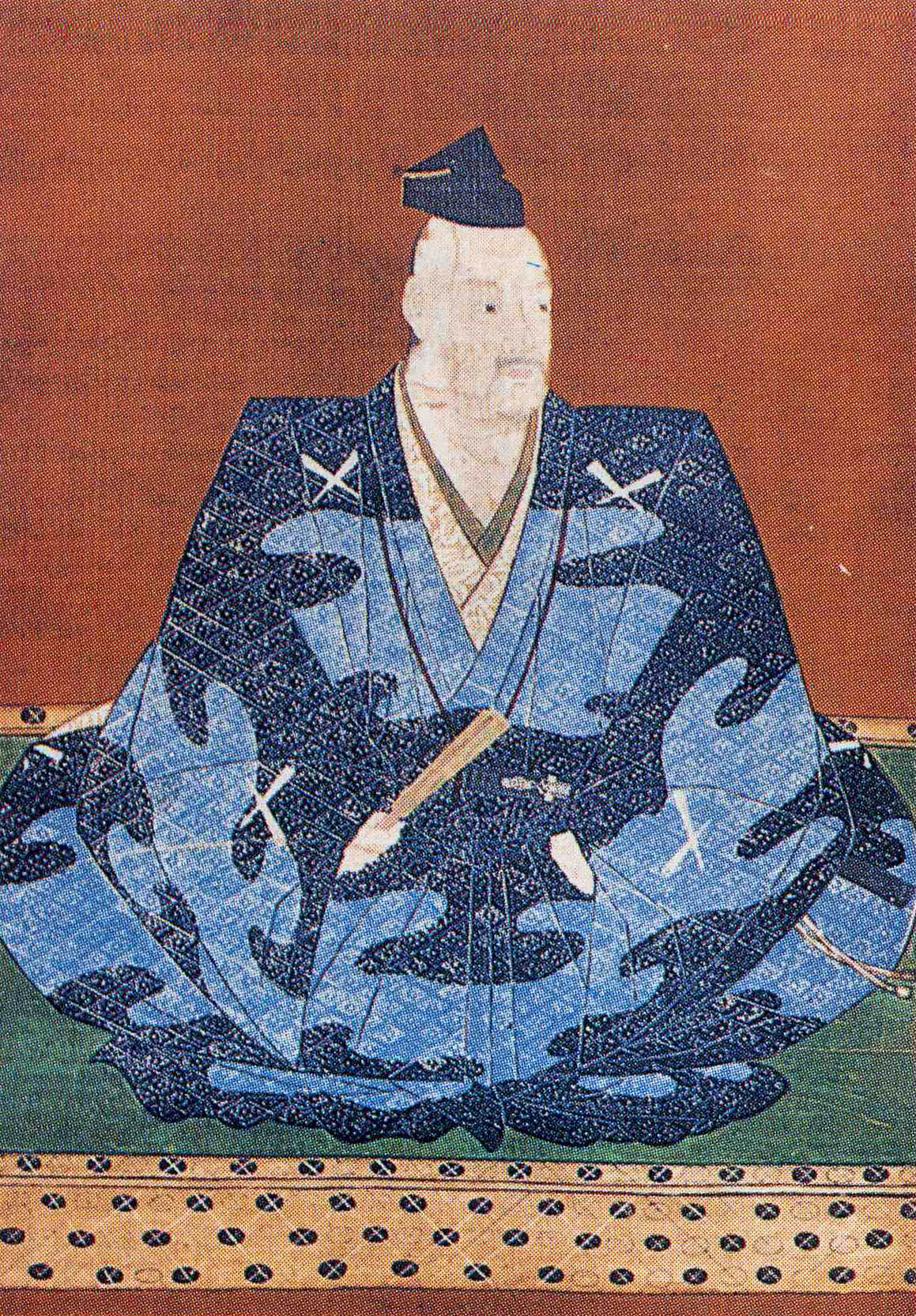
Azai Hisamasa

Hisamasa became the head of the clan in 1542 after his father died, but unlike his father, he was never a strong leader. Losing domains against Rokkaku clan, he instead became a Rokkaku retainer. Hisamasa's retainers had enough and, after his son Azai Nagamasa won the Battle of Norada against a force at least twice the size of his led by Rokkaku Yoshikata to win back independence, they forced Hisamasa into retirement.

Yet, this retirement was not complete and Hisamasa managed to hold some sway of the clan. This surfaced in 1570 after Oda Nobunaga - who was allied with Hisamasa's son, Azai Nagamasa - attacked Asakura Yoshikage, who had supported Hisamasa against enemies like the Rokkaku clan. Hating Nobunaga for his personality, Hisamasa demanded that the Azai clan pay back the support of the Asakura clan and forced a war by breaking the alliance. It is thought that Nagamasa opposed him and believed that the alliance could somehow be mended over time since he refused to divorce his wife, Oichi, but he failed to gain enough support to overturn Hisamasa.

In 1573, Odani Castle was besieged by Nobunaga's forces. Facing a loss, Hisamasa committed seppuku.

== Family ==
- Father: Azai Sukemasa (1491-1542)
- Son: Azai Nagamasa (1545-1573)
- Daughter: Kyōgoku Maria (1543-1618)
