= Azai Nagamasa =

Japanese daimyō of the Sengoku period (1545–1573)

- 浅井 長政
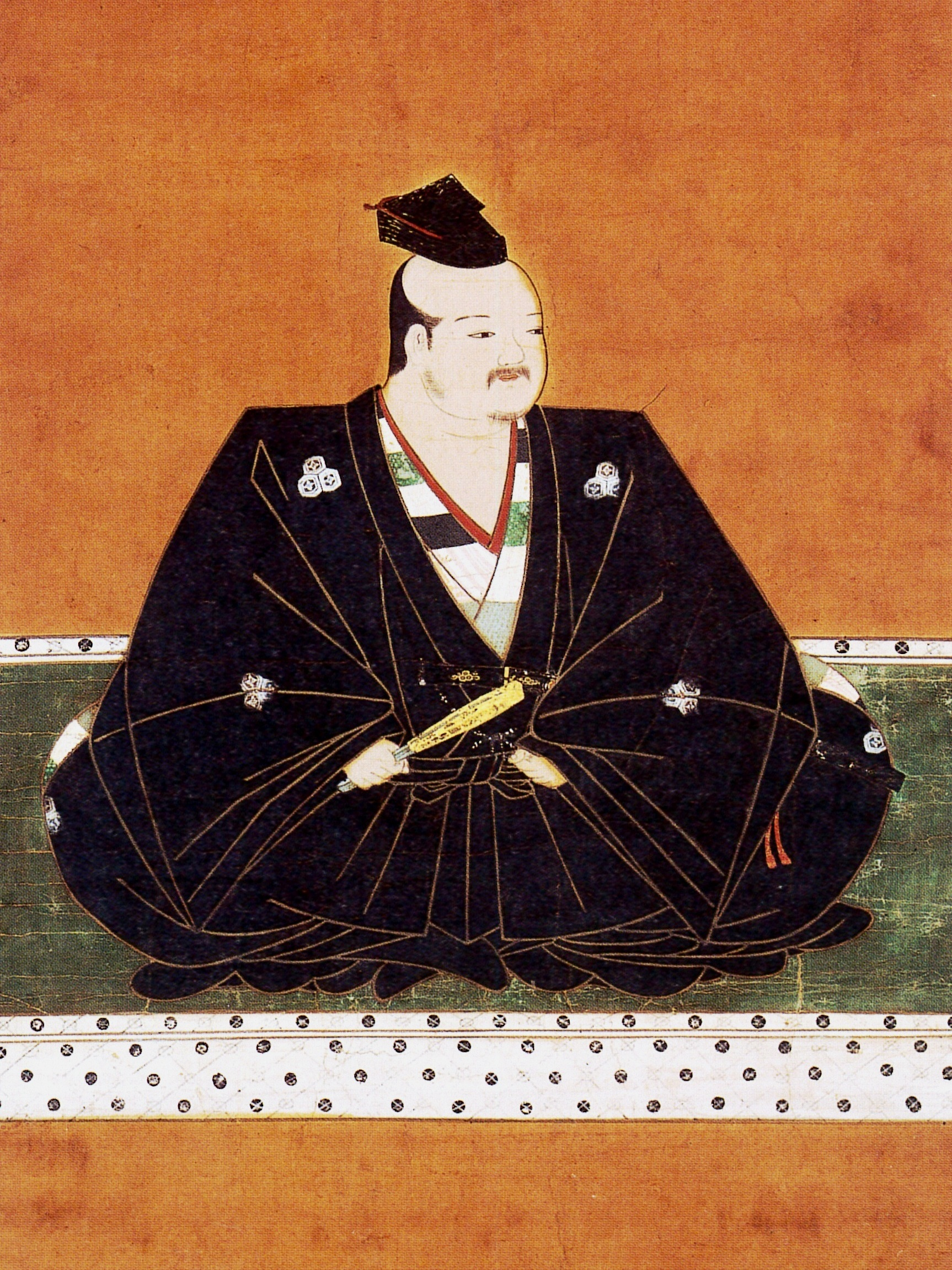

Head of Azai clan
- In office 1560–1573
- Preceded by: Azai Hisamasa

Personal details
- Born: 1545 Omi Province
- Died: September 26, 1573 (aged 27–28) Odani Castle
- Spouse: Oichi (Oda Nobunaga sister)
- Children: Yodo-dono (daughter); Ohatsu (daughter); Oeyo (daughter); Manpukumaru (son)
- Parent: Azai Hisamasa (father)

Military service
- Allegiance: Asakura clan
- Unit: Azai clan
- Battles/wars: Battle of Norada (1560); Attack on Saitō clan (1565); Siege of Kanegasaki (1570); Battle of Anegawa (1570); Siege of Odani Castle (1573)

Azai Nagamasa (浅井 長政; 1545 – 26 September 1573) was a Japanese daimyō of the Sengoku period known as the brother-in-law and enemy of Oda Nobunaga. Nagamasa was head of the Azai clan seated at Odani Castle in northern Ōmi Province and married Nobunaga's sister Oichi in 1564, fathering her three daughters – Yodo-dono, Ohatsu, and Oeyo – who became prominent figures in their own right.

Nagamasa became one of Nobunaga's enemies in 1570 due to the Azai alliance with the Asakura clan, and fought against Nobunaga at major battles including the Battle of Anegawa. Nagamasa and his clan were destroyed by Nobunaga in August 1573, and he committed seppuku during the siege of Odani Castle.

== Early life ==
Azai Nagamasa was the son of Azai Hisamasa, from whom he inherited clan leadership in 1560. Hisamasa had been compelled to step down by many of his retainers in favor of his son, Nagamasa. Hisamasa retired, and would later commit suicide along with his son in August 1573. Nagamasa successfully battled both Rokkaku Yoshikata and Saitō Tatsuoki between 1560 and 1565. He is remembered as being a capable commander of troops on the battlefield.

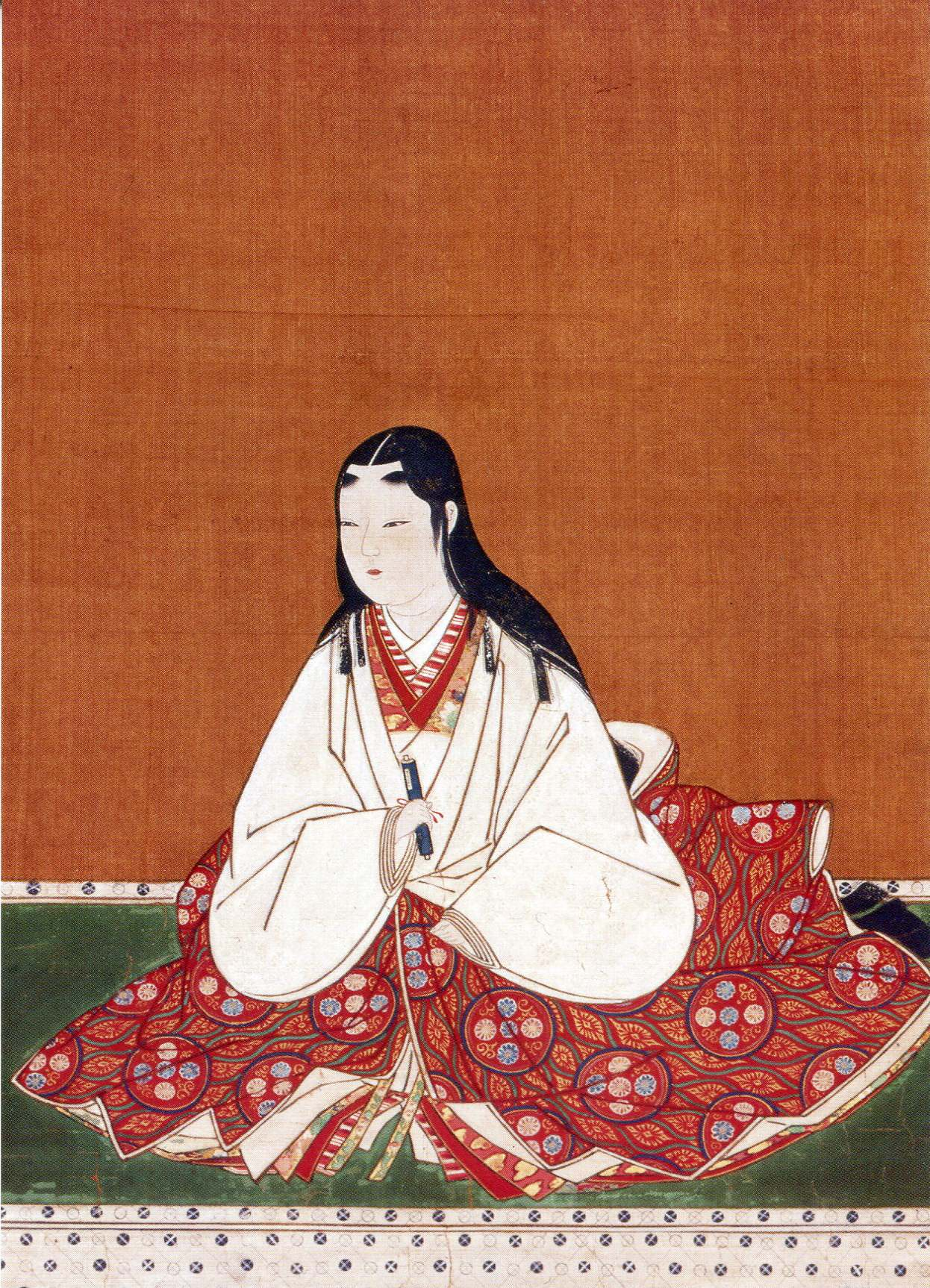
Oichi

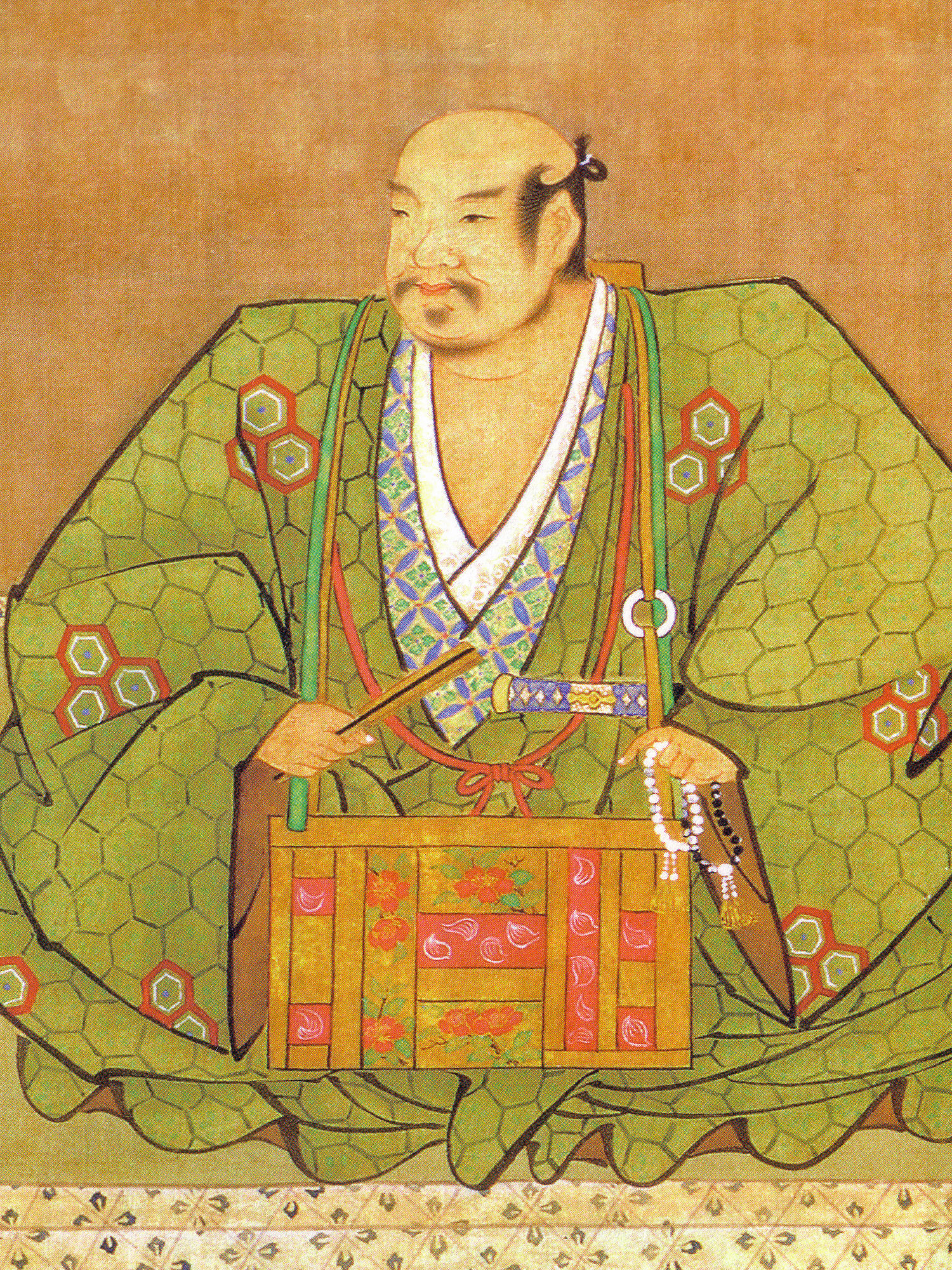
Azai Nagamasa in tonsure.

He married Oda Nobunaga's sister Oichi in 1564. Nobunaga desired peaceful relations with the Azai clan because of their strategic position in between Oda clan land's and the capital, Kyoto.

== Conflict with Oda Nobunaga ==
In 1570, Oda Nobunaga declared war on the Asakura family of Echizen and besieged Kanegasaki castle. The Asakura and Azai had been allies since the time of Nagamasa's grandfather. This sudden war between two Azai clan allies is reported to have divided the clan. Many retainers wished to honor the alliance with the Asakura, while Nagamasa himself is reported to have favoured staying neutral, essentially siding with Nobunaga. In the end, the Azai clan chose to honor the generations-old alliance with the Asakura and came to their aid. Initially, this decision caused Nobunaga's army, which was marching upon the Asakura's lands, to retreat back to Kyoto. However, within a few months the forces of Nobunaga were again on the march, but this time they marched on Azai lands.

=== Battle of Anegawa ===
In the summer of 1570, Oda Nobunaga and Tokugawa Ieyasu brought an army estimated between 20,000-30,000 men into Northern Omi. The Azai called upon their allies, the Asakura, for assistance. The Asakura responded by sending troops. In either June or July, the two sides met at the battle of Anegawa. The combined Azai and Asakura force numbered between 15,000-20,000 men. The outcome is recorded elsewhere, but briefly: The battle was strongly contested by both sides. Nobunaga is recorded as having decided that his force should directly confront the numerically inferior Azai clan force, while Ieyasu would engage the Asakura. While the Oda were being held at bay, and perhaps even slowly losing ground to the Azai - who had fought against numerically superior forces in the past - Ieyasu's force was apparently quickly gaining the advantage against the Asakura. Ieyasu, or perhaps one of his battle commanders, decided to send part of the Tokugawa force into the Azai flank, forcing the Azai to retreat, and guaranteeing victory. However, the battle was strategically indecisive because the Oda shortly withdrew.

== Death ==
Over the course of the next two years, with the exception of occasional interventions by the Shogun, Azai Nagamasa was under constant threat of Nobunaga aggression into Omi. Often these threats manifested into sieges of the Azai capital of Odani. During this period the Azai are seen as being loosely aligned with numerous anti-Oda forces, including the Asakura, the Miyoshi, the Rokkaku, and several religious complexes.

=== Siege of Odani Castle ===
In July 1573, Nobunaga laid siege to Odani Castle. Although the Asakura clan sent a relief force, Nobunaga defeated this force and chased the Asakura into their lands. Shortly thereafter, the Asakura were destroyed. Nobunaga then returned south to prosecute the siege of Odani Castle.

Nagamasa had no hope of winning, and chose to commit seppuku. Before dying, he entrusted his wife Oichi and their three daughters to Nobunaga.

Nobunaga later convinced Oichi to tell him where she had sent her infant son and Nagamasa's male heir, Manpukumaru, saying that he wanted the boy to live with and raise him. However, Nobunaga had Hideyoshi execute Manpukumaru, and the head was displayed on a stake. Nobunaga ensured that his sister, Oichi, was uninformed of this but she eventually came to that suspicion. There are reports that Nobunaga bore a strong grudge against Nagamasa for his perceived betrayal of their alliance even though it was he who broke the agreement first. It has also been reported that Nobunaga had the skulls of Nagamasa, Hisamasa, and the Asakura leader lacquered so that they could be used as cups, but whether this is historically accurate or merely fabricated to heighten Nobunaga's reputation is debatable.

== Family ==
- Father: Azai Hisamasa (1526–1573)
- Mother: Ono-dono (1527–1573)

Consorts and their issue(s):

- Wife (Seishitsu): Daughter of Hirai Sadatake (平井定武)
- Wife (Seishitsu): Oichi no Kata (小谷殿), sister of Oda Nobunaga
  - Lady Chacha (茶々, 1569– June 4, 1615), 1st daughter
    - Married the Kampaku Toyotomi Hideyoshi and had issue (two sons)
  - Lady Hatsu (お初, 1570 – 30 September 1633), 2nd daughter
    - Married daimyō Kyōgoku Takatsugu
  - Lady Oeyo (於江与, 1573 – 15 September 1626), 3rd daughter
    - Married Saji Kazunari (佐治一成, d. 1634) in 1583
    - Married Toyotomi Hidekatsu (豊臣 秀勝, d.1592) in 1591 and had issue (one daughter)
    - Married shōgun Tokugawa Hidetada (徳川 秀忠, d.1632) in 1595 and had issue (five daughters and two sons)
- Concubine (Sokuhitsu): Yae no Kata (八重の方)
  - Azai Ieyori (浅井井頼, d.1661), 3rd son
- Unknown
  - Azai Manpukumaru (浅井万福丸, 1564 – 1573), 1st son
  - Azai Manjumaru (万寿丸), 2nd son
  - Enjumaru (円寿丸), 4th son

== In popular culture ==
Azai Nagamasa as he appears in Koei's Samurai Warriors 2.

- Azai Nagamasa is an antagonist in the Action/RPG PS4/PC game Nioh 2, with a whole region being based about him and his battles against Oda Nobunaga.
- Nagamasa makes appearances as a general in the Main Campaign and in various Historical Battles and Historical Campaigns in the PC game Shogun: Total War. Additionally, Nagamasa returns as an Heir to the Azai Clan in the fan created Samurai Warlords Mod (aka the Shogun Mod) for the PC game Medieval Total War.
- Nagamasa is a playable character in the video game series Samurai Warriors, where he is depicted as an extremely honourable man who will stop at nothing to enforce his notions of justice. As in real life, Nagamasa is allied with the Asakura against Nobunaga at Anegawa; his expression of love for Oichi is however more dramatised, showing him as caring deeply for her welfare. He is depicted with his traditional kabuto helmet and uses a lance as his weapon. This version of Nagamasa also appears in the spin-off series Warriors Orochi as an unlockable character for the Cao Wei storyline.
- Nagamasa is an NPC in Sengoku Basara 2, along with Oichi, but becomes playable in the expansion Sengoku Basara 2: Heroes. He wields a long sword and carries a shield with him and is portrayed as a justice loving man, whose words and actions invokes a lot of the tokusatsu genre. He returns as a playable character in Sengoku Basara 4.
- Nagamasa serves as the basis for the protagonist character in the video game Pokémon Conquest.
