= Azai clan =

Japanese clan

Azai 浅井
- The emblem (mon) of the Azai clan
- Home province: Ōmi
- Titles: Daimyō
- Founder: Azai Sukemasa
- Final ruler: Azai Nagamasa
- Dissolution: 1573
- Ruled until: 1573, Azai Nagamasa commits seppuku

The Azai clan (Japanese: 浅井氏, Hepburn: Azai-shi), also rendered as Asai, was a Japanese clan during the Sengoku period.

== History ==
The Azai clan was a line of daimyōs (feudal military lords) seated at Odani Castle in northeastern Ōmi Province, located within present day Nagahama, Shiga Prefecture. The Azai originated in the early 1500s and claimed descent from the Hokke branch of the Fujiwara, a powerful clan in Japan from the Heian period to the Kamakura period. Initially, the clan were vassals of the Kyōgoku, but gradually emerged as independent daimyōs in northern Ōmi. However, Azai domains were soon conquered by the Rokkaku and the clan was forced into becoming their vassals. Azai Nagamasa became head of the clan in 1560 and successfully fought against the Rokkaku for independence by 1564. The Azai were long-time allies with the Asakura clan of Echizen Province who had assisted the clan in securing their independence. In 1570, Nagamasa joined the Asakura in their opposition to lord Oda Nobunaga, his brother-in-law and ally, to honour their alliance. The Azai were defeated by Nobunaga at the Battle of Anegawa in 1570, and all but eliminated when Nobunaga conquered Odani Castle and Nagamasa committed seppuku (honorable suicide) in 1573.

== Order of succession ==
- Azai Sukemasa – son of Azai Naotane, established Odani Castle in 1516
- Azai Hisamasa – son of Sukemasa, was defeated by the Sasaki clan
- Azai Nagamasa – son of Hisamasa, came into conflict with Oda Nobunaga and opposed him, entering an alliance with the Asakura clan and the monks of Mount Hiei; he was defeated and forced to suicide by Nobunaga in 1573. He was married to Nobunaga's sister Oichi. His daughters included Yodo-dono (second wife of Toyotomi Hideyoshi and mother of Toyotomi Hideyori, heir of Hideyoshi). Also Oeyo (wife of second shōgun Tokugawa Hidetada and mother of the third Tokugawa shōgun Iemitsu)

== Prominent vassals ==
- Kyōgoku Takayoshi
- Akao Kiyotsuna
- Isono Kazumasa
- Kaihō Tsunachika
- Amenomori Kiyosada
- Tōdō Takatora
