= Odani Castle =

Castle in Nagahama, Shiga Prefecture, Japan

Coordinates: 35°27′33″N 136°16′37″E

- 小谷城
- Nagahama, Shiga Prefecture, Japan
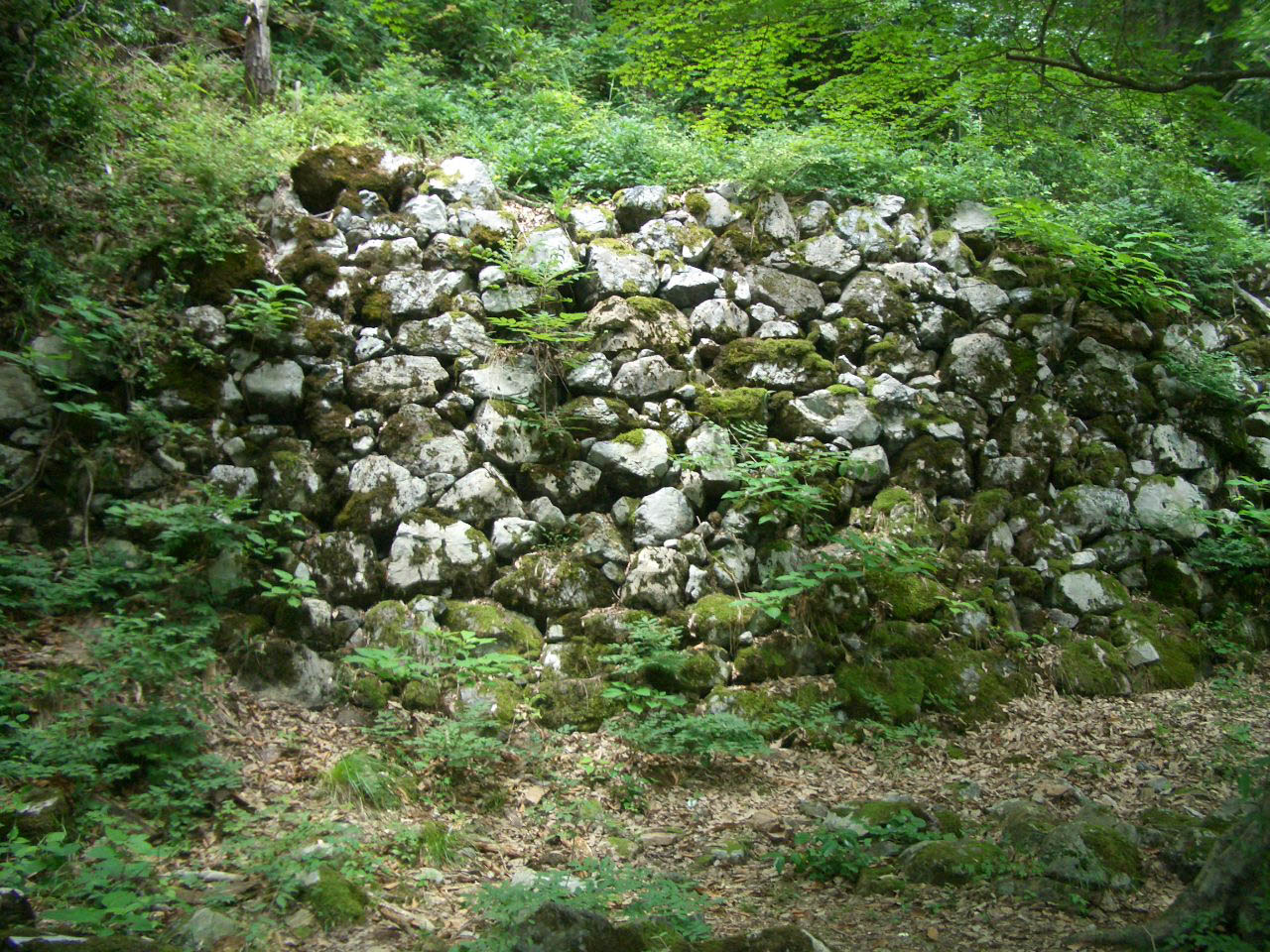
- Odani Castle ruins

Site information
- Type: Yamashiro-style Japanese castle
- Open to the public: yes (no public facilities)
- Condition: ruins

Location
- Odani Castle
- Location within Shiga Prefecture Location within Japan

Site history
- Built: 1516
- Built by: Azai Sukemasa
- In use: Sengoku period
- Demolished: 1573

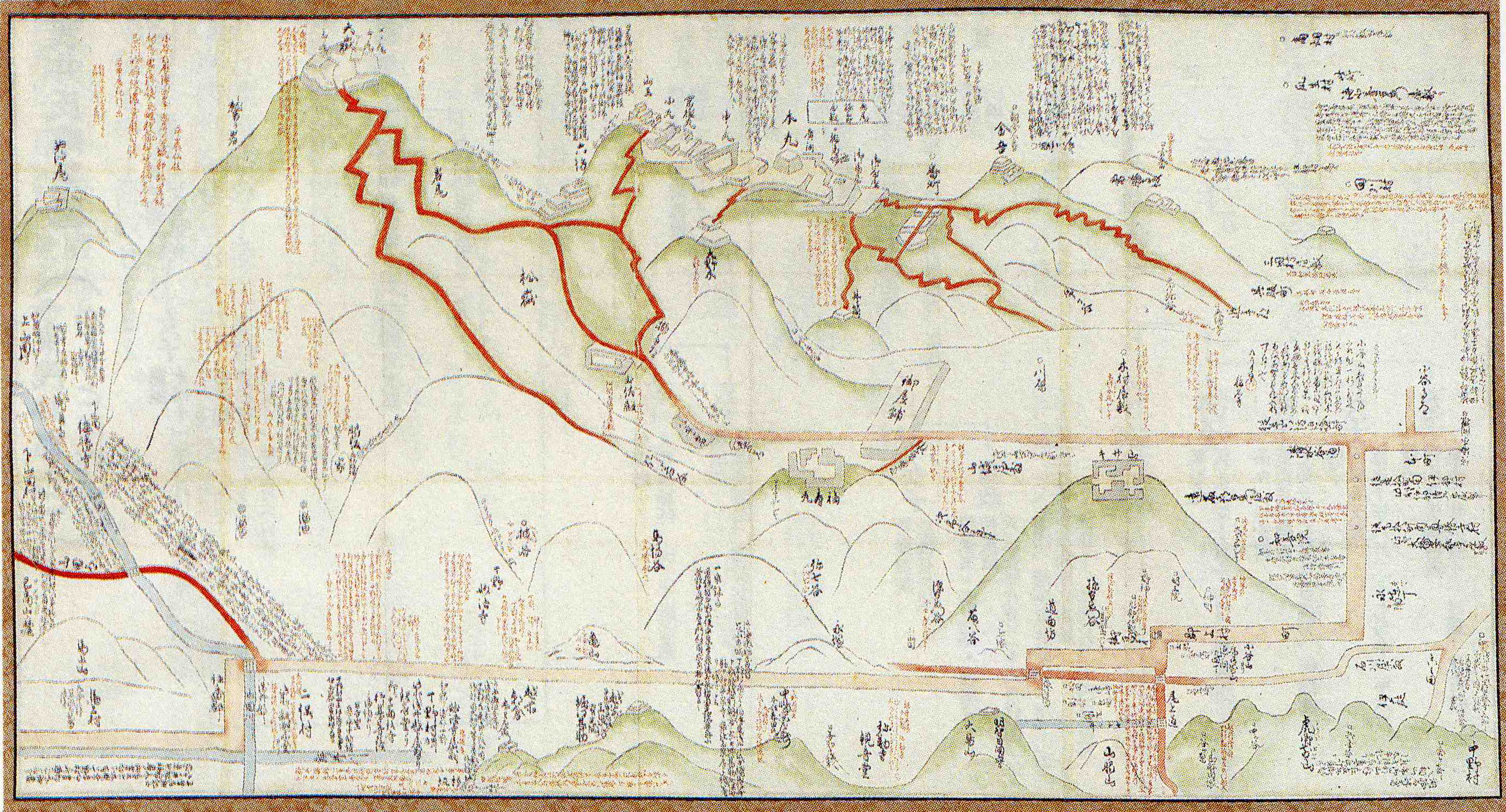
Map of Odani Castle

Odani Castle (小谷城, Odani-jō) was a Sengoku period mountain-top Japanese castle located in the former town of Kohoku, now part of Nagahama city, in Shiga Prefecture, Japan. Only the ruins remain today. It was the home castle of the Azai clan and the mountain it was built upon was considered to be impregnable. The castle fell during Oda Nobunaga's siege in the Genki and Tenshō eras (Siege of Odani Castle), in 1573. Its ruins have been protected as a National Historic Site since 2005.

== Overview ==
Odani Castle is regarded as among Japan's Five Greatest Mountain Castles, along with Kasugayama Castle, Nanao Castle, Kannonji Castle and Gassantoda Castle. The castle's main area is over 800 meters long, and with the outlier fortifications on surrounding mountain ridges, the total area is over a square kilometer.

== History ==
During the Nanboku-chō period, northern Ōmi Province (modern Shiga Prefecture) was under the control of the Kyōgoku clan, vassals of the Ashikaga shogunate. However, the Kyōgoku preferred to govern by proxy while remaining behind to enjoy the comforts of Kyoto and to engage in internal politics of the shogunate. As a result, their authority was gradually weakened, and local lords, such as the minor Azai clan, were able to seize power. Northern Ōmi was nominally under control of the Asami clan as deputies of the Kyōgoku. From 1516, Azai Sukemasa formed an alliance of minor warlords from 1516 and were able to expel the Asami by 1520. Kyōgoku Takakiyo had no choice but to accept this fait accompli, and named Azai Sukemasa as his deputy governor, but this was only a nominal title, and for all intents and purposes, the Azai clan had emerged as an independent power in northern Ōmi. Construction of Odani Castle began around this time. However, the Azai clan was still weak and after being attacked in 1525 by the Rokkaku clan of southern Ōmi, were forced to turn to the Asakura clan in Echizen Province for assistance. As a result, the Azai clan became subordinate to the Asakura, and was still faced with a continual struggle against the Kyōgoku clan, who never abandoned their claim of overlordship of the territory.

In 1558, under Azai Hisamasa, the clan was forced to pledge fealty to the Rokkaku and to yield some territory, and to marry his son Azai Katamasa to a daughter of Rokkaku Yoshikata. His dissatisfied retainers forced Hisamasa into retirement the following year and Azai Katamasa became the clan leader. Angered over this situation, the Rokkaku invaded in 1560 with an army of 25,000 men. Although highly outnumbered, the Azai were able to defeat the Rokkaku, and Azai Katamasa changed his name to Azai Nagamasa. He then pursued an aggressive campaign to seize more of the Rokkaku territories in southern Ōmi and into Mino Province and with the increased power and prestige of the Azai clan, Odani Castle was also expanded and strengthened. However, by expanding into southern Ōmi and Mino, the Azai came into conflict with Oda Nobunaga. Initially, Azai Nagamasa decided to accept an alliance with Nobunaga and married Nobunaga's younger sister Oichi, but on the condition that Nobunaga also agree to a non-aggression treaty with the Asakura clan. In August 1569, Nobunaga attacked the Asakura in violation of the agreement. At the Siege of Kanegasaki (1570) the Asakura and Azai armies caught Nobunaga in a pincer movement and forced his retreat. Nobunaga later returned with a new army and Tokugawa Ieyasu as his ally. At the Battle of Anegawa, five kilometers south of Odani Castle, the Azai were defeated, losing half their territory and were besieged. With the support of the Asakura, Odani Castle held for a long time. However, Nobunaga's general Toyotomi Hideyoshi actively recruited defectors from among the Azai generals and was able to defeat the Asakura forces at the Siege of Hikida Castle and the Siege of Ichijōdani Castle. With the annihilation of their Asakura allies, it was impossible for the Azai to continue the war. Once Hideyoshi's forces had penetrated to the third bailey of the castle, Azai Hisamasa and Azai Nagamasa killed themselves and the castle fell. Hideyoshi used Odani Castle as his own stronghold while he completed the construction of Nagahama Castle on the shores of Lake Biwa, dismantling and moving some of the buildings and using its stone walls as raw materials for his new castle. Once Nagahama Castle was complete, Hideyoshi relocated there and Odani Castle was abolished.

Odani Castle was listed as one of Japan's Top 100 Castles by the Japan Castle Foundation in 2006.

== Structure ==
Odani Castle is a long mountain castle that is built on the ridges and valleys of the surrounding area. At the center of main area is a huge dry moat of 20 meters in width, which divides the castle into two parts. The inner area behind the moat was the older and more important part of the castle, with the Third Bailey (San-no-maru) at the highest point of the mountain. The castle structure, as was common for Japanese castles of this period, consisted of numerous enclosures with earthen ramparts and dry moats. The area in front of the large moat was the more modern portion of the castle with the palace for the Azai clan in an enclosure protected by stone-lined ramparts and a compound gate, along with a large yagura turret.

Little remains of the castle today except for some fragmentary portions of dry moats and stone walls. The entrance to the site is a 45-minute walk from Kawake Station on the JR West Hokuriku Main Line, and it is a further one-hour hike up the mountain to reach the hilltop ruins.

== Gallery ==
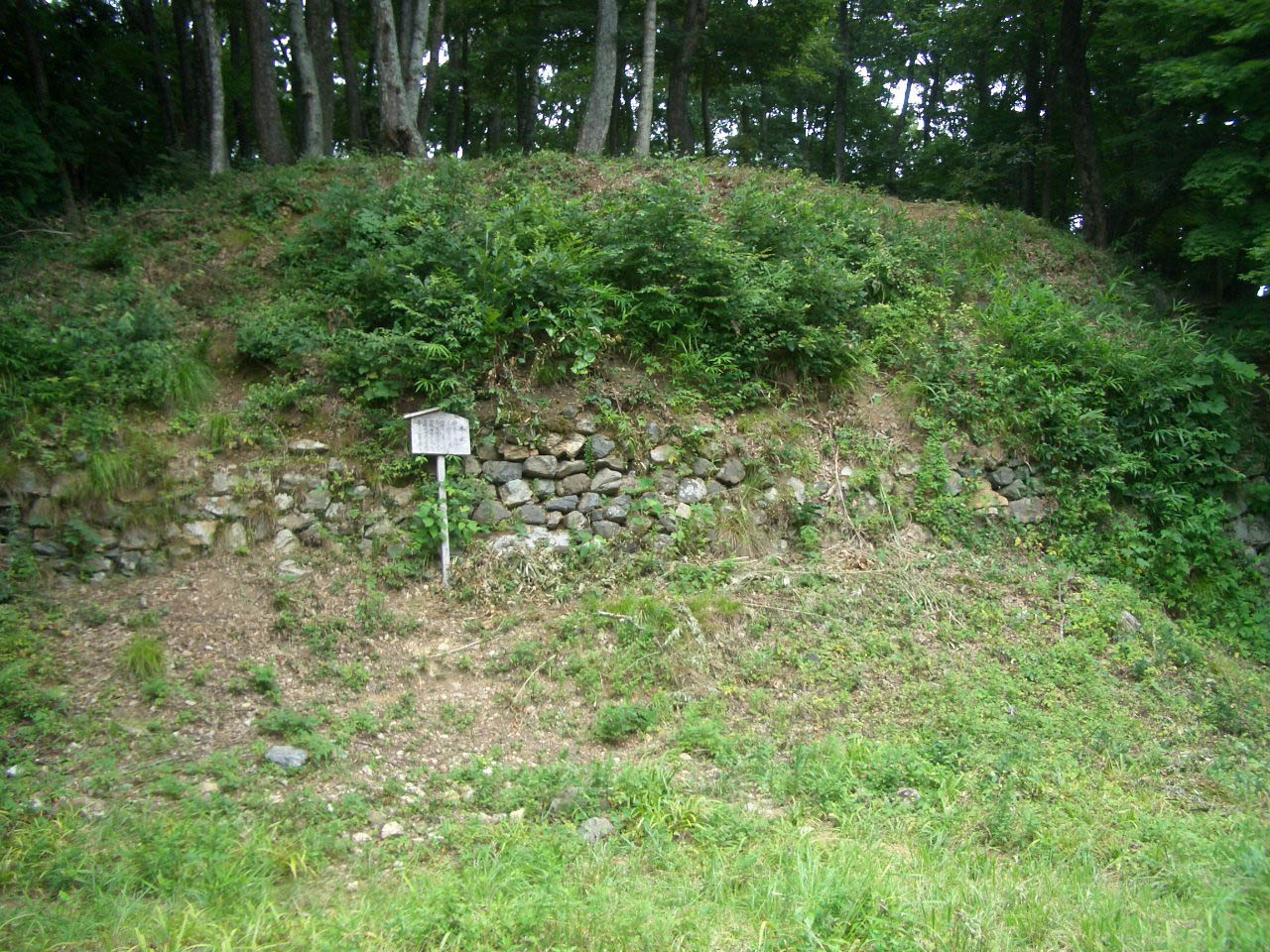
Stone wall of Honmaru Compound

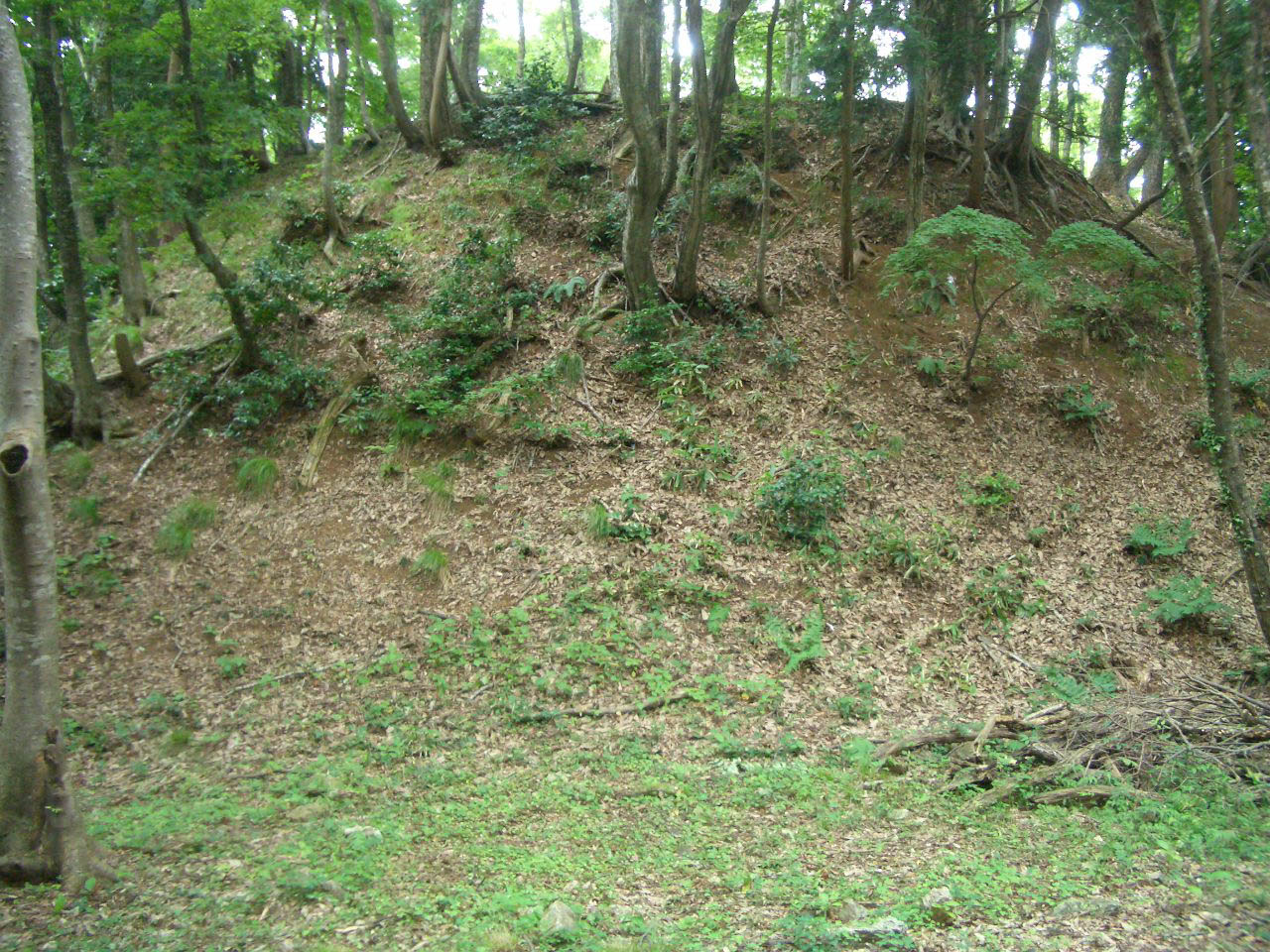
Horikiri style moat

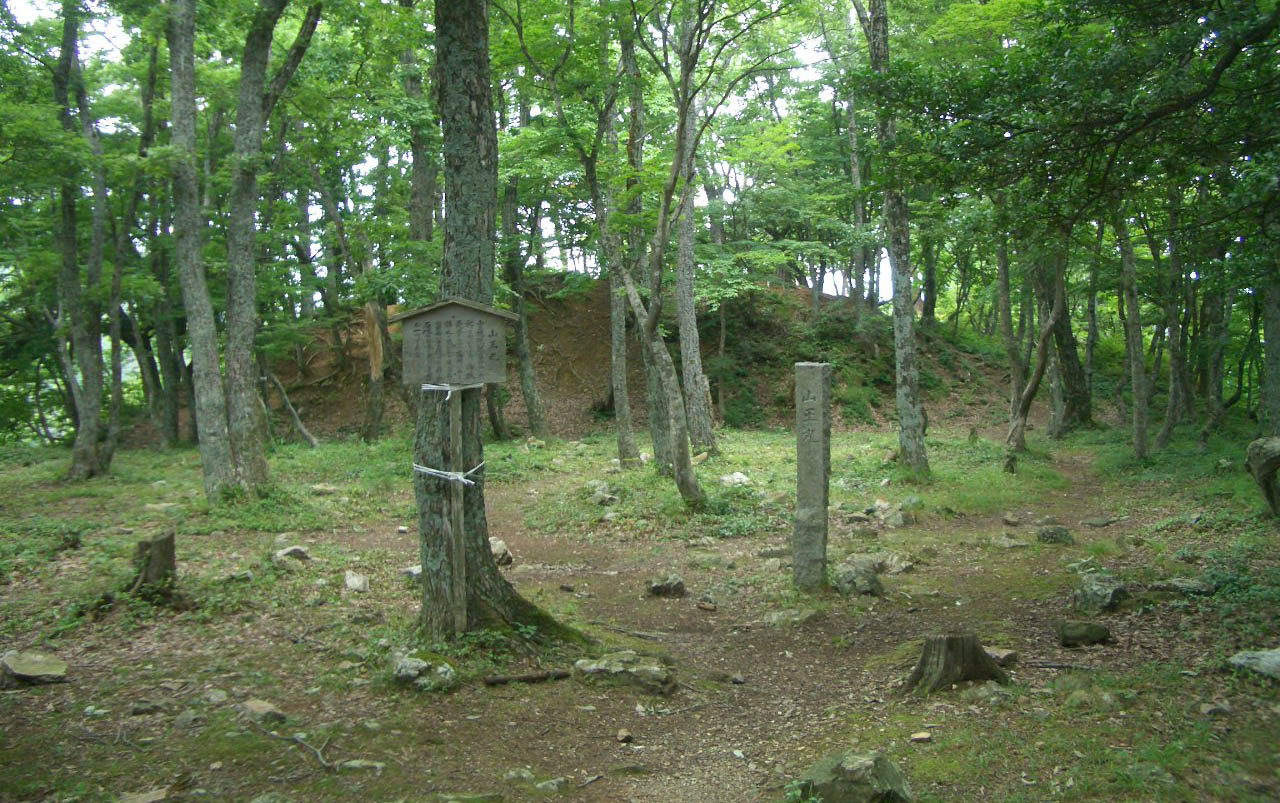
Sannomaru Compound

== See also ==
- List of Historic Sites of Japan (Shiga)
