= Gamō (surname) =

Gamō (written: 蒲生) is a Japanese surname. Notable people with the surname include:

- Gamō clan (蒲生氏, Gamō-shi), Japanese clan which claimed descent from the Fujiwara clan
- Gamō Hiroshi (ガモウ ひろし), manga artist known for his works at the magazine Weekly Shōnen Jump
- Shigeo Gamō (蒲生, 重男; ガモウ, シゲオ, born 1928), Japanese biologist and specialist of crustaceans
- Gamō Hideyuki (蒲生 秀行, 1583–1612), Japanese daimyō who ruled the Aizu domain
- Gamō Katahide (蒲生 賢秀) (1534–1584), Japanese daimyō of the Sengoku and Azuchi-Momoyama periods
- Seimei Gamo (蒲生 晴明, born 1954), Japanese handball player
- Gamō Ujisato (蒲生 氏郷, 1556–1595), Japanese daimyō of the Sengoku and Azuchi-Momoyama periods
- Yasusato Gamō (蒲生 保郷, born 1873 - 1928), Japanese educator
