= List of Tottemo! Luckyman chapters =

Tottemo! Luckyman is a Japanese manga series written and illustrated by Hiroshi Gamo. Following a one-shot chapter published in Shueisha's shōnen manga magazine Weekly Shōnen Jump on April 12, 1993, the manga was serialized in the same magazine from August 6 of that same year until July 7, 1997.

== Volume list ==
No.	Title	Japanese release date	Japanese ISBN
1	Lucky Cookie Comics Volume 1 Rakkī Kukkī Komikkusu Ichi-kan no Maki (ラッキー クッキー コミックス1巻の巻～)	February 1994	978-4-08-871247-5
Lucky 1: "Lucky Cookie Enter Luckyman!" (ラッキー クッキー ラッキーマン登場ー！の巻～, Rakkī Kukkī Rakkīman Tōjō! no Maki); Lucky 2: "Lucky Cookie He's Here! Oyaji" (ラッキー クッキー でた！おやじーの巻～, Rakkī Kukkī Deta! Oyaji no Maki); Lucky 3: "Lucky Cookie Water Surprise!" (ラッキー クッキー 水中でドッキリ！の巻～, Rakkī Kukkī Suichū de Dokkiri! no Maki); Lucky 4: "Lucky Cookie Birth of Luckyman Number 2!" (ラッキー クッキー ラッキーマン2号誕生！の巻～, Rakkī Kukkī Rakkīman Ni-gō Tanjō! no Maki); Lucky 5: "Lucky Cookie Tears of Friendship" (ラッキー クッキー 友情の涙の巻～, Rakkī Kukkī Yūjō no Namida no Maki); Lucky 6: "Lucky Cookie Awful Hiking Experience" (ラッキー クッキー ハイキングでこりごりの巻～, Rakkī Kukkī Haikingu de Korigori no Maki); Lucky 7: "Lucky Cookie Enter the Strongest Enemy" (ラッキー クッキー 最強の敵登場の巻～, Rakkī Kukkī Saikyō no Teki Tōjō no Maki); Lucky 8: "Lucky Cookie The Alien's Revenge" (ラッキー クッキー 復讐鬼再登場の巻～, Rakkī Kukkī Fukushū oni Saitōjō no Maki); Lucky 9: "Lucky Cookie 3 Match Marathon" (ラッキー クッキー 運動会3本勝負の巻～, Rakkī Kukkī Undōkai San-pon Shōbu no Maki); Lucky 10: "Lucky Cookie Great Animal Panic" (ラッキー クッキー アニマル大パニックの巻～, Rakkī Kukkī Animaru Dai Panikku no Maki)
2	Lucky Cookie Comics Volume 2 Rakkī Kukkī Komikkusu Ni-kan no Maki (ラッキー クッキー コミックス2巻の巻～)	May 1994	978-4-08-871248-2
Lucky 11: "Lucky Cookie The Question Now" (ラッキー クッキー さてここで問題ですの巻～, Rakkī Kukkī Sate Koko de Mondai Desu no Maki); Lucky 12: "Lucky Cookie One Ugly Space Monster" (ラッキー クッキー 宇宙一醜い怪獣の巻～, Rakkī Kukkī Deta! Uchū Ichi Minikui Kaijū no Maki); Lucky 13: "Lucky Cookie Calling on a New Hero" (ラッキー クッキー 新ヒーロー参上の巻～, Rakkī Kukkī Shin Hīrō Sanjō no Maki); Lucky 14: "Lucky Cookie Lovely Master and Pupil Love" (ラッキー クッキー 麗しき師弟愛の巻～, Rakkī Kukkī Uruwashiki Shitei Ai no Maki); Lucky 15: "Lucky Cookie Happy Birthday" (ラッキー クッキー ハッピーバースデーの巻～, Rakkī Kukkī Happī Bāsudē no Maki); Lucky 16: "Lucky Cookie I'm a Hero" (ラッキー クッキー 俺がヒーローだの巻～, Rakkī Kukkī Ore ga Hīrō no Maki); Lucky 17: "Lucky Cookie On Behalf of Heck!?" (ラッキー クッキー です代って一体！？の巻～, Rakkī Kukkī Desu Daitte Ittai!? no Maki); Lucky 18: "Lucky Cookie Combined Technology!" (ラッキー クッキー 合体技！の巻～, Rakkī Kukkī Gattai Waza! no Maki); Lucky 19: "Lucky Cookie Snowy Mountain Invite!!" (ラッキー クッキー 雪山は招くよ！！の巻～, Rakkī Kukkī Yukiyama wa Maneku yo!! no Maki); Lucky 20: "Lucky Cookie It's Spring Cleaning in the Streets!" (ラッキー クッキー 街を大掃除だ！の巻～, Rakkī Kukkī Machi o Daisōji Da! no Maki); Lucky 21: "Lucky Cookie Clash! Top-Spinning" (ラッキー クッキー 激突！コマ回しの巻～, Rakkī Kukkī Gekitotsu! Koma-Mawashi no Maki); One-Shot Special PART 1.: "Calling on Luckyman!" (ラッキーマン参上！の巻～, Rakkīman Sanjō! no Maki); One-Shot Special PART 2.: "3 Game Olympics" (オリンピック3本勝負の巻～, Orinpikku San-pon Shōbu no Maki)
3	Lucky Cookie Comics Volume 3 Rakkī Kukkī Komikkusu San-kan no Maki (ラッキー クッキー コミックス3巻の巻～)	July 1994	978-4-08-871249-9
Lucky 22: "Lucky Cookie I will Teach You How to Spend the Cold Winter!" (ラッキー クッキー 寒い冬のすごし方教えます！の巻～, Rakkī Kukkī Samui Fuyu no Sugoshi-kata Oshiemasu! no Maki); Lucky 23: "Lucky Cookie Aliens and Aliens..." (ラッキー クッキー 鬼は鬼でも…の巻～, Rakkī Kukkī Oni wa Oni Demo... no Maki); Lucky 24: "Lucky Cookie Superstarman Persists" (ラッキー クッキー スーパースターマンがんばるの巻～, Rakkī Kukkī Sūpāsutāman Ganbaru no Maki); Lucky 25: "Lucky Cookie Love For Yoichi!" (ラッキー クッキー 洋一その愛！の巻～, Rakkī Kukkī Yōichi Sono Ai! no Maki); Lucky 26: "Lucky Cookie Happiness Call Pendant" (ラッキー クッキー 幸せを呼ぶペンダントの巻～, Rakkī Kukkī Shiawase o Yobu Pendanto no Maki); Lucky 27: "Lucky Cookie Dear Father is Strong!" (ラッキー クッキー 父よあなたは強かった！の巻～, Rakkī Kukkī Chichiyo Anata wa Tsuyokatta! no Maki); Lucky 28: "Lucky Cookie Captain Yoichi" (ラッキー クッキー キャプテン洋一の巻～, Rakkī Kukkī Kyaputen Yōichi no Maki); Lucky 29: "Lucky Cookie Farewell Luckyman!" (ラッキー クッキー さらばラッキーマン！の巻～, Rakkī Kukkī Saraba Rakkīman! no Maki); Lucky 30: "Lucky Cookie Biggest Crisis on Earth" (ラッキー クッキー 地球最大の危機～の巻～, Rakkī Kukkī Chikyū Saidai no Kiki no Maki); Lucky 31: "Lucky Cookie Biggest Crisis on Earth Continued" (ラッキー クッキー 続・地球最大の危機～の巻～, Rakkī Kukkī Zoku Chikyū Saidai no Kiki no Maki); Lucky 32: "Lucky Cookie Biggest Crisis on Earth Continued" (ラッキー クッキー 続々・地球最大の危機～の巻～, Rakkī Kukkī Zokuzoku Chikyū Saidai no Kiki no Maki); Lucky 33: "Lucky Cookie Biggest Crisis on Earth Continued" (ラッキー クッキー 続々々・地球最大の危機～の巻～, Rakkī Kukkī Zokuzokuzoku Chikyū Saidai no Kiki no Maki); Lucky 34: "Lucky Cookie Biggest Crisis on Earth Continued" (ラッキー クッキー 続々々々・地球最大の危機～の巻～, Rakkī Kukkī Zokuzokuzokuzoku Chikyū Saidai no Kiki no Maki); Lucky 35: "Lucky Cookie Biggest Crisis on Earth Continued" (ラッキー クッキー 続々々々々・地球最大の危機～の巻～, Rakkī Kukkī Zokuzokuzokuzokuzoku Chikyū Saidai no Kiki no Maki)
4	Lucky Cookie Comics Volume 4 Rakkī Kukkī Komikkusu Shi-kan no Maki (ラッキー クッキー コミックス4巻の巻～)	October 1994	978-4-08-871250-5
Lucky 36: "Lucky Cookie Is he Here!? Super Luckyman" (ラッキー クッキー 出たか！？スーパーラッキーマンの巻～, Rakkī Kukkī Deta ka!? Sūpā Rakkīman no Maki); Lucky 37: "Lucky Cookie A New Character Appears" (ラッキー クッキー 新キャラクター登場の巻～, Rakkī Kukkī Shin Kyarakutā Tōjō no Maki); Lucky 38: "Lucky Cookie Snowstorm Overstrain" (ラッキー クッキー 風雪努力節の巻～, Rakkī Kukkī Fūsetsu Doryoku-bushi no Maki); Lucky 39: "Lucky Cookie Shock!! Doryokuman's Past Revelation!!!" (ラッキー クッキー 衝撃！！努力マンの過去発覚！！！の巻～, Rakkī Kukkī Shōgeki!! Doryokuman no Kako Hakkaku!!! no Maki); Lucky 40: "Lucky Cookie The President's Public Announcement!! & Killer Appearance!!" (ラッキー クッキー 会長の顔発表！！&殺し屋登場！！の巻～, Rakkī Kukkī Kaichō no Kao Happyō!! ando Koroshi-ya Tōjō!! no Maki); Lucky 41: "Lucky Cookie 2 Luckymans" (ラッキー クッキー 2人のラッキーマンの巻～, Rakkī Kukkī Futari no Rakkīman no Maki); Lucky 42: "Lucky Cookie Beginning of the Battle of Fear" (ラッキー クッキー 恐怖の戦いの幕開けの巻～, Rakkī Kukkī Kyōfu no Tatakai no Makuake no Maki); Lucky 43: "Lucky Cookie Which Guard!?" (ラッキー クッキー 誰が先鋒！？の巻～, Rakkī Kukkī Dare ga Senpō!? no Maki); Lucky 44: "Lucky Cookie Superstarman's Transformation!?" (ラッキー クッキー スーパースターマン変身！？の巻～, Rakkī Kukkī Sūpāsutāman Henshin!? no Maki); Lucky 45: "Lucky Cookie Superstarman's Defeat!" (ラッキー クッキー スーパースターマン敗北！の巻～, Rakkī Kukkī Sūpāsutāman Haiboku! no Maki); Lucky 46: "Lucky Cookie Speed Match" (ラッキー クッキー スピード勝負の巻～, Rakkī Kukkī Supīdo Shōbu no Maki); Lucky 47: "Lucky Cookie Calling on 2 Great Enemies!" (ラッキー クッキー 第2の敵参上！の巻～, Rakkī Kukkī Dai Ni no Teki Sanjō! no Maki); Lucky 48: "Lucky Cookie Golden Rule of the Match" (ラッキー クッキー 勝負の鉄則の巻～, Rakkī Kukkī Shōbu no Tessoku no Maki)
5	Lucky Cookie Comics Volume 5 Rakkī Kukkī Komikkusu Go Kan no Maki (ラッキー クッキー コミックス5巻の巻～)	December 1994	978-4-08-871569-8
Lucky 49: "Lucky Cookie It's Sinister!!" (ラッキー クッキー 不吉だ！！の巻～, Rakkī Kukkī Fukitsu Da!! no Maki); Lucky 50: "Lucky Cookie Brother's Back" (ラッキー クッキー 兄の背中の巻～, Rakkī Kukkī Ani no Senaka no Maki); Lucky 51: "Lucky Cookie It's Incomparable!!" (ラッキー クッキー かくがちがう！！の巻～, Rakkī Kukkī Kaku ga Chigau!! no Maki); Lucky 52: "Lucky Cookie Dust Piling Mission!" (ラッキー クッキー チリも積もれば作戦！の巻～, Rakkī Kukkī Chiri mo Tsumoreba Sakusen! no Maki); Lucky 53: "Lucky Cookie Doryokuman's Anger" (ラッキー クッキー 怒りの努力マンの巻～, Rakkī Kukkī Ikari no Doryokuman no Maki); Lucky 54: "Lucky Cookie The 2 Victory" (ラッキー クッキー 2人の勝利！の巻～, Rakkī Kukkī Futari no Shōri! no Maki); Lucky 55: "Lucky Cookie Settled At Last!!" (ラッキー クッキー ついに決着つく！！の巻～, Rakkī Kukkī Tsuini Ketchaku Tsuku!! no Maki); Lucky 56: "Lucky Cookie I Will Dispel Resentment!" (ラッキー クッキー 恨みはらします！の巻～, Rakkī Kukkī Urami Harashi Masu! no Maki); Lucky 57: "Lucky Cookie The President's Guts" (ラッキー クッキー 会長の根性！！の巻～, Rakkī Kukkī Kaichō no Konjō!! no Maki); Lucky 58: "Lucky Cookie The most Painful Death in the World" (ラッキー クッキー この世で最も苦しい死に方の巻～, Rakkī Kukkī Konoyo de Mottomo Kurushī Shinikata no Maki); Lucky 59: "Lucky Cookie Luckyman's Final Moment" (ラッキー クッキー ラッキーマン最期の日の巻～, Rakkī Kukkī Rakkīman Saigo no Hi no Maki); Lucky 60: "Lucky Cookie Returning Hero!" (ラッキー クッキー ヒーローにもどる！の巻～, Rakkī Kukkī Hīrō ni Modoru! no Maki)
6	Lucky Cookie Comics Volume 6 Rakkī Kukkī Komikkusu Roku Kan no Maki (ラッキー クッキー コミックス6巻の巻～)	April 1995	978-4-08-871570-4
Lucky 61: "Lucky Cookie Truth! The Hero Association Can Help" (ラッキー クッキー 実録！ヒーロー協会ができるまでの巻～, Rakkī Kukkī Jitsuroku! Hīrō Kyōkai ga Dekiru Made no Maki); Lucky 62: "Lucky Cookie Yotsu-chan's Secret Weapon" (ラッキー クッキー よっちゃんの秘密兵器の巻～, Rakkī Kukkī Yotsu-chan no Himitsu Heiki no Maki); Lucky 63: "Lucky Cookie You Cannot Win You Cannot Win" (ラッキー クッキー 勝てる うるせー 勝てる うるせーの巻～, Rakkī Kukkī Kateru Uruse ̄Kateru Uruse no Maki); Lucky 64: "Lucky Cookie I Will not Surrender!" (ラッキー クッキー まけるもんか！の巻～, Rakkī Kukkī Makeru Mon ka! no Maki); Lucky 65: "Lucky Cookie What Should I do" (ラッキー クッキー ど～すりゃいいんだ～の巻～, Rakkī Kukkī Dosuru yaīn da no Maki); Lucky 66: "Lucky Cookie Go For it Katsutoshi-kun!" (ラッキー クッキー 頑張れ勝利くん！の巻～, Rakkī Kukkī Ganbare Katsutoshi-kun! no Maki); Lucky 67: "Lucky Cookie Large Hero Collection" (ラッキー クッキー ヒーロー大集合！の巻～, Rakkī Kukkī Hīrō Dai Shūgō! no Maki); Lucky 68: "Lucky Cookie World of Fear" (ラッキー クッキー 恐怖の世界の巻～, Rakkī Kukkī Kyōfu no Sekai no Maki); Lucky 69: "Lucky Cookie Transform" (ラッキー クッキー へ～んしんの巻～, Rakkī Kukkī Henshin no Maki); Lucky 70: "Lucky Cookie Backwards Backwards Still Backwards" (ラッキー クッキー 逆転 逆転 また逆転の巻～, Rakkī Kukkī Gyakuten Gyakuten Mata Gyakuten no Maki); Lucky 71: "Lucky Cookie Legend of the Sanhonbashira!" (ラッキー クッキー 伝説の三本柱！の巻～, Rakkī Kukkī Densetsu no Sanhonbashira! no Maki); Lucky 72: "Lucky Cookie Three Arrows" (ラッキー クッキー 三本の矢の巻～, Rakkī Kukkī Sanbon no Ya no Maki)
7	Lucky Cookie Comics Volume 7 Rakkī Kukkī Komikkusu Nana Kan no Maki (ラッキー クッキー コミックス7巻の巻～)	August 1995	978-4-08-871896-5
Lucky 73: "Lucky Cookie The True Yonaoshiman!" (ラッキー クッキー 真の世直しマン！の巻～, Rakkī Kukkī Shin no Yonaoshiman! no Maki); Lucky 74: "Lucky Cookie Luckyman's Wedding" (ラッキー クッキー ラッキーマンの結婚式～の巻～, Rakkī Kukkī Rakkīman no Kekkonshiki no Maki); Lucky 75: "Lucky Cookie What is This Game!?" (ラッキー クッキー 勝負ってのは…！？の巻～, Rakkī Kukkī Shōbu Tte no wa...!? no Maki); Lucky 76: "Lucky Cookie Head Straight For the Sun!!" (ラッキー クッキー 太陽にまっしぐら！！の巻～, Rakkī Kukkī Taiyō ni Masshigura!! no Maki); Lucky 77: "Lucky Cookie Denouement" (ラッキー クッキー 大団円の巻～, Rakkī Kukkī Daidanen no Maki); Lucky 78: "Lucky Cookie Three Transfer Students" (ラッキー クッキー 三人の転校生の巻～, Rakkī Kukkī Sannin no Tenkōsei no Maki); Lucky 79: "Lucky Cookie Huge Fight!" (ラッキー クッキー 大げんか！の巻～, Rakkī Kukkī Dai Gen ka! no Maki); Lucky 80: "Lucky Cookie First Love Exertion?" (ラッキー クッキー 努力の初恋？の巻～, Rakkī Kukkī Doryoku no Hatsukoi? no Maki)
8	Lucky Cookie Comics Volume 8 Rakkī Kukkī Komikkusu Hachi Kan no Maki (ラッキー クッキー コミックス8巻の巻～)	November 1995	978-4-08-871897-2
Lucky 81: "Lucky Cookie Butler Rebellion" (ラッキー クッキー バトラーの反乱の巻～, Rakkī Kukkī Batorā no Hanran no Maki); Lucky 82: "Lucky Cookie Great Volleyball Explosion!" (ラッキー クッキー バレーボールで大爆発！の巻～, Rakkī Kukkī Barēbōru de Dai Bakuhatsu! no Maki); Lucky 83: "Lucky Cookie It's Part 3 of This" (ラッキー クッキー 今回から第3部だよの巻～, Rakkī Kukkī Konkai Kara Dai San-buda yo no Maki); Lucky 84: "Lucky Cookie This is the Arena!?" (ラッキー クッキー これが試合場！？の巻～, Rakkī Kukkī Kore ga Shiai-ba!? no Maki); Lucky 85: "Lucky Cookie H-1GP Opening!" (ラッキー クッキー H－1GP開幕！の巻～, Rakkī Kukkī Eichi-Wan Jī Pī Kaimaku! no Maki); Lucky 86: "Lucky Cookie A New Hero" (ラッキー クッキー 新ヒーローでちゅの巻～, Rakkī Kukkī Shin Hīrō Dechu no Maki); Lucky 87: "Lucky Cookie Card Battle Determination!" (ラッキー クッキー 対戦カード決定！の巻～, Rakkī Kukkī Taisen Kādo Kettei! no Maki); Lucky 88: "Lucky Cookie This is the Answer!" (ラッキー クッキー これが答えだ！の巻～, Rakkī Kukkī Kore ga Kotae da! no Maki); Lucky 89: "Lucky Cookie It's Started! Teacher Student Showdown!!" (ラッキー クッキー ついに開始！師弟対決！！の巻～, Rakkī Kukkī Tsuini Kaishi! Shitei Taiketsu!! no Maki); Lucky 90: "Lucky Cookie Finding the Mystery of the New, Powerful Special Moves!" (ラッキー クッキー 努力、新必殺技の謎を追え！の巻～, Rakkī Kukkī Doryoku, Shin Hissawwaza no Nazo o Oe! no Maki); Lucky 91: "Lucky Cookie Powerful Killer Move!! <Resolution Chapter>" (ラッキー クッキー 努力の必殺技！！<解決編>の巻～, Rakkī Kukkī Doryoku no Hissawwaza!! <Kaiketsu Hen> no Maki); Lucky 92: "Lucky Cookie Beautiful Teacher Student Love!" (ラッキー クッキー 美しき師弟愛！の巻～, Rakkī Kukkī Utsukushiki Shi Tei Ai! no Maki)
9	Lucky Cookie Comics Volume 9 Rakkī Kukkī Komikkusu Kyū Kan no Maki (ラッキー クッキー コミックス9巻の巻～)	February 1996	978-4-08-871897-2
Lucky 93: "Lucky Cookie Enter Yujoman!!" (ラッキー クッキー 友情マン登場！！の巻～, Rakkī Kukkī Yūjōman Tōjō!! no Maki); Lucky 94: "Lucky Cookie The True Form of Yujoman!" (ラッキー クッキー 友情マンの真の姿！の巻～, Rakkī Kukkī Yūjōman no Shin no Sugata! no Maki); Lucky 95: "Lucky Cookie Tournament Issues!?" (ラッキー クッキー トーナメントの問題点！？の巻～, Rakkī Kukkī Tōnamento no Mondaiten!? no Maki); Lucky 96: "Lucky Cookie The Strongest 16 People!!" (ラッキー クッキー 最強の16人見参！！の巻～, Rakkī Kukkī Saikyō no Jūroku Ri Kenzan!! no Maki); Lucky 97: "Lucky Cookie Proof of Being NO.1!!" (ラッキー クッキー NO．1の証！！の巻～, Rakkī Kukkī NANBĀ.Wan No Akashi!! no Maki); Lucky 98: "Lucky Cookie Enter the Heroine!!" (ラッキー クッキー ヒロイン登場！！の巻～, Rakkī Kukkī Hiroin Tōjō!! no Maki); Lucky 99: "Lucky Cookie Superstarman Dies!" (ラッキー クッキー スーパースターマン死す！の巻～, Rakkī Kukkī Sūpāsutāman Shisu! no Maki); Lucky 100: "Lucky Cookie Shoriman in a Big Pinch!!" (ラッキー クッキー 勝利マン大ピンチ！！の巻～, Rakkī Kukkī Shōriman Dai Pinchi!! no Maki); Lucky 101: "Lucky Cookie Big Storm in the Tournament!?" (ラッキー クッキー トーナメントは大波乱！？の巻～, Rakkī Kukkī Tōnamento wa Dai Haran!? no Maki); Lucky 102: "Lucky Cookie A Savior Appears!" (ラッキー クッキー 救世主現る！の巻～, Rakkī Kukkī Kyūseishu Genru! no Maki); Lucky 103: "Lucky Cookie Nice Guy of the Universe!" (ラッキー クッキー 宇宙一のナイスガイ！の巻～, Rakkī Kukkī Uchū Ichi no Naisu Gai! no Maki); Lucky 104: "Lucky Cookie Raman's Secret <3" (ラッキー クッキー ラマンの秘密♥の巻～, Rakkī Kukkī Raman no Himitsu <3 no Maki)
10	Lucky Cookie Comics Volume 10; Rakkī Kukkī Komikkusu Jū Kan no Maki (ラッキー クッキー コミックス10巻の巻～)	May 1996	978-4-08-872222-1
Lucky 105: "Lucky Cookie Baba Wins!?" (ラッキー クッキー ババはどっち！？の巻～, Rakkī Kukkī Baba wa Dotchi!? no Maki); Lucky 106: "Lucky Cookie Botsu-chanman's Identity!?" (ラッキー クッキー ぼっちゃんマンの正体！？の巻～, Rakkī Kukkī Botsu-chanman no Shōtai!? no Maki); Lucky 107: "Lucky Cookie The Hero's True Face!" (ラッキー クッキー ヒーロー神のお顔！の巻～, Rakkī Kukkī Hīrō Shin no Okao! no Maki); Lucky 108: "Lucky Cookie Another Black Hole!!" (ラッキー クッキー ブラックホール再び！！の巻～); Lucky 109: "Lucky Cookie Go For it Superstarman!!" (ラッキー クッキー がんばれスーパースターマン！！の巻～, Rakkī Kukkī Ganbare Sūpāsutāman!! no Maki); Lucky 110: "Lucky Cookie Satsu-chan's Fortress!!" (ラッキー クッキー さっちゃんの要塞！！の巻～, Rakkī Kukkī Satsu-chan no Yōsai!! no Maki); Lucky 111: "Lucky Cookie Big Analysis of Luckyman!!" (ラッキー クッキー ラッキーマン大分析！！の巻～, Rakkī Kukkī Rakkīman Dai Bunseki!! no Maki); Lucky 112: "Lucky Cookie Back to the Real Universe!!" (ラッキー クッキー ほんとの裏宇宙！！の巻～, Rakkī Kukkī Honto no Ura Uchū!! no Maki); Lucky 113: "Lucky Cookie Decoration Harry" (ラッキー クッキー デコレーション・ハリーの巻～, Rakkī Kukkī Dekorēshon Harī no Maki); Lucky 114: "Lucky Cookie Satsu-chan's Strategy!!" (ラッキー クッキー さっちゃんの作戦！！の巻～, Rakkī Kukkī Satsu-chan no Sakusen!! no Maki); Lucky 115: "Lucky Cookie Twin Guardians!!" (ラッキー クッキー 双子の番人！！の巻～, Rakkī Kukkī Futago no Bannin!! no Maki); Lucky 116: "Lucky Cookie Christmas Eve Present" (ラッキー クッキー 聖夜のプレゼントの巻～, Rakkī Kukkī Seiya no Purezento no Maki)
11	Lucky Cookie Comics Volume 11; Rakkī Kukkī Komikkusu Jūichi Kan no Maki (ラッキー クッキー コミックス11巻の巻～)	July 1996	978-4-08-872223-8
Lucky 117: "Lucky Cookie Satsu-chan's Name!!" (ラッキー クッキー さっちゃんの名前！！の巻～, Rakkī Kukkī Satsu-chan no Namae!! no Maki); Lucky 118: "Lucky Cookie The Hero Association Division Splits!?" (ラッキー クッキー ヒーロー協会分裂！？の巻～, Rakkī Kukkī Hīrō Kyōkai Bunretsu!? no Maki); Lucky 119: "Lucky Cookie Invincible Taro!!" (ラッキー クッキー 無敵の太郎！！の巻～, Rakkī Kukkī Muteki no Tarō!! no Maki); Lucky 120: "Lucky Cookie A Helper Appears!?" (ラッキー クッキー 助っ人登場！？の巻～, Rakkī Kukkī Suketto Tōjō!? no Maki); Lucky 121: "Lucky Cookie Legendary Power!!" (ラッキー クッキー 伝説のパワー！！の巻～, Rakkī Kukkī Densetsu no Pawā!! no Maki); Lucky 122: "Lucky Cookie The Fight From Now on!!" (ラッキー クッキー 戦いはこれから！！の巻～, Rakkī Kukkī Tatakai wa Korekara!! no Maki); Lucky 123: "Lucky Cookie Satsu-chan's Real Face Appears!!" (ラッキー クッキー さっちゃんの素顔登場！！の巻～, Rakkī Kukkī Satsu-chan no Sugao Tōjō!! no Maki); Lucky 124: "Lucky Cookie Kyuseishuman's Letter!!" (ラッキー クッキー 救世主マンの手紙！！の巻～, Rakkī Kukkī Kyūseishuman no Tegami!! no Maki); Lucky 125: "Lucky Cookie Hero Splitting Up!?" (ラッキー クッキー ヒーロー仲間割れ！？の巻～, Rakkī Kukkī Hīrō Nakamaware!? no Maki); Lucky 126: "Lucky Cookie Save the Earth!!" (ラッキー クッキー 地球を救え！！の巻～, Rakkī Kukkī Chikyū o Sukue!! no Maki); Lucky 127: "Lucky Cookie Satsu-chan Resurrected!?" (ラッキー クッキー さっちゃん復活！？の巻～, Rakkī Kukkī Satsu-chan Fukkatsu!? no Maki); Lucky 128: "Lucky Cookie Reset Button" (ラッキー クッキー リセットボタンの巻～, Rakkī Kukkī Risetto Botan no Maki)
12	Lucky Cookie Comics Volume 12; Rakkī Kukkī Komikkusu Jūni Kan no Maki (ラッキー クッキー コミックス12巻の巻～)	October 1996	978-4-08-872224-5
Lucky 129: "Lucky Cookie Lucky Riding!" (ラッキー クッキー ついてるね のってるね！の巻～, Rakkī Kukkī Tsuiteru ne Notsuteru ne! no Maki); Lucky 130: "Lucky Cookie Impossible Escape!" (ラッキー クッキー 脱出不可能！の巻～, Rakkī Kukkī Dasshutsu Fukanō! no Maki); Lucky 131: "Lucky Cookie Lonely Kisakura" (ラッキー クッキー さびしがり屋の黄桜の巻～, Rakkī Kukkī Sabishigariya no Kisakura no Maki); Lucky 132: "Lucky Cookie This Week's Recruits" (ラッキー クッキー 今週は募集つきーの巻～, Rakkī Kukkī Konshū wa Boshū-tsuki no Maki); Lucky 133: "Lucky Cookie Shoriman and Isono Katsutoshi-kun's Mundane Sunday" (ラッキー クッキー 勝利マンこと磯野勝利くんのごく平凡な日曜日の巻～, Rakkī Kukkī Shōriman koto Isono Katsutoshi-kun no Gokuheibonna Nichiyōbi no Maki); Lucky 134: "Lucky Cookie Farewell First Love!! Making a Love Song" (ラッキー クッキー さらば初恋！！努力恋唄綴りの巻～, Rakkī Kukkī Saraba Hatsukoi!! Doryoku Koi Uta Tsuzuri no Maki); Lucky 135: "Lucky Cookie Your Dreams Become Reality!! Hero V.S. The Five Secret Heinous Alien Society Showdown!!" (ラッキー クッキー キミの夢が現実に！！ヒーローV．S．秘密結社凶悪宇宙人五番勝負！！の巻～, Rakkī Kukkī Kimi no Yume ga Genjitsu ni!! Hīrō Tai Himitsu Kessha Kyōaku Uchūbito Gobanshōbu!! no Maki); Lucky 136: "Lucky Cookie Master Detective Tensaiman!" (ラッキー クッキー 名探偵天才マン！の巻～, Rakkī Kukkī Mei Tantei Tensaiman! no Maki); Lucky 137: "Lucky Cookie Great Space Unification Tournament!!" (ラッキー クッキー 大宇宙統一トーナメント！！の巻～, Rakkī Kukkī Dai Uchū Tōitsu Tōnamento!! no Maki); Lucky 138: "Lucky Cookie Go to the Top!!" (ラッキー クッキー せんとうにたっていけ！！の巻～, Rakkī Kukkī Sen Tōni Tatte Ike!! no Maki); Lucky 139: "Lucky Cookie Cannot get Away With it!" (ラッキー クッキー ただではすまん！の巻～, Rakkī Kukkī Tada de wa Suman no Maki); Lucky 140: "Lucky Cookie Stressful Defeat!?" (ラッキー クッキー 努力敗北！？の巻～, Rakkī Kukkī Doryoku Haiboku!? no Maki)
13	Lucky Cookie Comics Volume 13; Rakkī Kukkī Komikkusu Jūsan Kan no Maki (ラッキー クッキー コミックス13巻の巻～)	December 1996	978-4-08-872225-2
Lucky 141: "Lucky Cookie Deciding on One Swing!!" (ラッキー クッキー 一振りで決める！！の巻～, Rakkī Kukkī Hito Furi de Kimeru!! no Maki); Lucky 142: "Lucky Cookie Colleagues are Here!" (ラッキー クッキー 仲間がいる！の巻～, Rakkī Kukkī Nakama ga Iru! no Maki); Lucky 143: "Lucky Cookie Now is I has Teach" (ラッキー クッキー 今度は私が教える！の巻～, Rakkī Kukkī Kondo wa Watashi ga Oshieru! no Maki); Lucky 144: "Lucky Cookie Harsh Training!!" (ラッキー クッキー 苛酷な修行！！の巻～, Rakkī Kukkī Kakoku na Shugyō!! no Maki); Lucky 145: "Lucky Cookie Oneshot of Weight" (ラッキー クッキー 一発の重さの巻～, Rakkī Kukkī Ippatsu no Omosa no Maki); Lucky 146: "Lucky Cookie I will Kill!!" (ラッキー クッキー 私がぶっ殺す！！の巻～, Rakkī Kukkī Watashi ga Bukkorosu!! no Maki); Lucky 147: "Lucky Cookie Heavy, Itchy, Eyes are Around~" (ラッキー クッキー 重い、かゆい、目がまわる～の巻～, Rakkī Kukkī Omoi, Kayui, Me ga Mawaru~ no Maki); Lucky 148: "Lucky Cookie Make the Money!" (ラッキー クッキー お金を作ろう！の巻～, Rakkī Kukkī Okane o Tsukurō! no Maki); Lucky 149: "Lucky Cookie New Battlefield - Surprising Enemy" (ラッキー クッキー 新たな戦場・意外な敵の巻～, Rakkī Kukkī Arata na Senjō - Igai na Teki no Maki); Lucky 150: "Lucky Cookie Shingo-sama of Love" (ラッキー クッキー 愛しのしんご様の巻～, Rakkī Kukkī Aishi no Shingo-sama no Maki); Lucky 151: "Lucky Cookie Strongest - Worst Enemy!!" (ラッキー クッキー 最強・最悪の敵！！の巻～, Rakkī Kukkī Saikyō - Saiaku no Teki!! no Maki)
14	Lucky Cookie Comics Volume 14; Rakkī Kukkī Komikkusu Jūshi Kan no Maki (ラッキー クッキー コミックス14巻の巻～)	March 1997	978-4-08-872226-9
Lucky 152: "Lucky Cookie Relieved" (ラッキー クッキー よかったの巻～, Rakkī Kukkī Yokatta no Maki); Lucky 153: "Lucky Cookie Tears of Effort" (ラッキー クッキー 努力の涙！の巻～, Rakkī Kukkī Doryoku no Namida! no Maki); Lucky 154: "Lucky Cookie Burned Out" (ラッキー クッキー 燃えつきたの巻～, Rakkī Kukkī Moe Tsukita no Maki); Lucky 155: "Lucky Cookie Men Came Back!" (ラッキー クッキー 帰って来た男！の巻～, Rakkī Kukkī Kaette Kita Otoko! no Maki); Lucky 156: "Lucky Cookie Watching Tour Customers Announcement" (ラッキー クッキー 観戦ツアー客発表！！の巻～, Rakkī Kukkī Kansen Tsuā Kyaku Happyō!! no Maki); Lucky 157: "Lucky Cookie Baseball Boy of Ancient" (ラッキー クッキー 古の野球少年の巻～, Rakkī Kukkī Inishie no Yakyū Shōnen no Maki); Lucky 158: "Lucky Cookie Hero Team First Bat!!" (ラッキー クッキー 先攻ヒーローチーム！！の巻～, Rakkī Kukkī Sen Kō Hīrō Chīmu!! no Maki); Lucky 159: "Lucky Cookie Fear of X Attack!! (ラッキー クッキー 恐怖のX攻撃！！の巻～, Rakkī Kukkī Kyōfu no EKKUSU Kōgeki!! no Maki); Lucky 160: "Lucky Cookie Making a Homerun Notice" (ラッキー クッキー なるか予告ホームランの巻～, Rakkī Kukkī Naru ka Yokoku Hōmuran no Maki); Lucky 161: "Lucky Cookie Murder Magic Ball!" (ラッキー クッキー 殺人魔球！の巻～, Rakkī Kukkī Satsujin Ma Kyū! no Maki); Lucky 162: "Lucky Cookie Ace of Scratches!" (ラッキー クッキー 傷だらけのエース！の巻～, Rakkī Kukkī Kizudarake no Ēsu! no Maki); Lucky 163: "Lucky Cookie Special Planning!" (ラッキー クッキー 年末特別企画あり！の巻～, Rakkī Kukkī Tokubetsu kikakuari! no Maki)
15	Lucky Cookie Comics Volume 15; Rakkī Kukkī Komikkusu Jūgo Kan no Maki (ラッキー クッキー コミックス15巻の巻～)	June 1997	978-4-08-872227-6
Lucky 164: "Lucky Cookie Great Space One...!!" (ラッキー クッキー 大宇宙一…！！の巻～, Rakkī Kukkī Dai Uchū Ichi...!! no Maki); Lucky 165: "Lucky Cookie Baseball Guys Style!!" (ラッキー クッキー 奴等の野球スタイル！！の巻～, Rakkī Kukkī Yatsura no Yakyū Sutairu!! no Maki); Lucky 166: "Lucky Cookie Last 9 Baseball" (ラッキー クッキー ギリギリの9人野球！の巻～, Rakkī Kukkī Girigiri no 9-ri Yakyū! no Maki); Lucky 167: "Lucky Cookie Devil Sphere Lucky Ball!" (ラッキー クッキー 魔球ラッキーボール！の巻～, Rakkī Kukkī Ma Kyū Rakkī Bōru! no Maki); Lucky 168: "Lucky Cookie Great One Universe Homerun is Stupid!" (ラッキー クッキー 大宇宙一アホらしいホームラン！の巻～, Rakkī Kukkī Dai Uchū Ichi Aho Rashī Hōmuran! no Maki); Lucky 169: "Lucky Cookie Western Bases Loaded" (ラッキー クッキー 二死満塁の巻～, Rakkī Kukkī Nishi Man Rui no Maki); Lucky 170: "Lucky Cookie Expected Practice" (ラッキー クッキー 練習どおりの巻～, Rakkī Kukkī Renshū Dōri no Maki); Lucky 171: "Lucky Cookie Three BOX" (ラッキー クッキー みっつのBOX！の巻～, Rakkī Kukkī Mittsu no BOX! no Maki); Lucky 172: "Lucky Cookie Victory First Defeat!?" (ラッキー クッキー 勝利初敗北！？の巻～, Rakkī Kukkī Shōri Hatsu Haiboku!? no Maki); Lucky 173: "Lucky Cookie Hero of Invulnerability" (ラッキー クッキー 不死身のヒーローの巻～, Rakkī Kukkī Fujimi no Hīrō no Maki); Lucky 174: "Lucky Cookie Paradise! Baseball Fist" (ラッキー クッキー 極楽！野球拳の巻～, Rakkī Kukkī Gokuraku! Yakyū Ken no Maki)
16	Lucky Cookie Comics Volume 16; Rakkī Kukkī Komikkusu Jūroku Kan no Maki (ラッキー クッキー コミックス16巻の巻～)	October 1997	978-4-08-872228-3
Lucky 175: "Lucky Cookie Fun Cooking!" (ラッキー クッキー 楽しいクッキング！の巻～, Rakkī Kukkī Tanoshī Kukkingu! no Maki); Lucky 176: "Lucky Cookie Battle of Shadow!" (ラッキー クッキー 影の戦い！の巻～, Rakkī Kukkī Kage no Tatakai! no Maki); Lucky 177: "Lucky Cookie Splendid Roman of Ro-Man" (ラッキー クッキー ロ・マンの華麗なるロマンの巻～, Rakkī Kukkī Ro-Man no Karei Naru Roman no Maki); Lucky 178: "Lucky Cookie This is Man's Living Road!" (ラッキー クッキー これが男の生きる道！の巻～, Rakkī Kukkī Kore ga Otoko no Ikiru Michi! no Maki); Lucky 179: "Lucky Cookie Pair Pair!" (ラッキー クッキー ペアペア！の巻～, Rakkī Kukkī Pea Pea! no Maki); Lucky 180: "Lucky Cookie Determination of Lucky" (ラッキー クッキー ラッキーの決意！の巻～, Rakkī Kukkī Rakkī no Ketsui! no Maki); Lucky 181: "Lucky Cookie Somehow Amazing Lucky" (ラッキー クッキー 何だかすごいラッキーの巻～, Rakkī Kukkī Nandaka Sugoi Rakkī no Maki); Lucky 182: "Lucky Cookie Genius Luckyman" (ラッキー クッキー 天才ラッキーマンの巻～, Rakkī Kukkī Tensai Rakkīman no Maki); Lucky 183: "Lucky Cookie Sorry Grandpa!" (ラッキー クッキー おじいちゃん ごめん！の巻～, Rakkī Kukkī Ojī-chan Gomen! no Maki); Lucky 184: "Lucky Cookie Only You are Great Space God!!" (ラッキー クッキー キミこそ大宇宙神だ！！の巻～, Rakkī Kukkī Kimi Koso Dai Uchū Kami da!! no Maki); Lucky 185: "Lucky Cookie Maximum Big Space Crisis!!" (ラッキー クッキー 大宇宙最大の危機！！の巻～, Rakkī Kukkī Dai Uchū Saidai no Kiki!! no Maki); Lucky 186: "Lucky Cookie Great Universe God of Trouble" (ラッキー クッキー 大宇宙神の悩みの巻～, Rakkī Kukkī Dai Uchū Shin no Nayami no Maki); Lucky 187: "Lucky Cookie Farewell Luckyman!" (ラッキー クッキー さらばラッキーマン！の巻～, Rakkī Kukkī Saraba Rakkīman! no Maki); Lucky 188: "Lucky Cookie Goodbye and Hello" (ラッキー クッキー さよなら そして こんにちはの巻～, Rakkī Kukkī Sayonara Soshite Konnichiwa no Maki)
