= 蒲生 =

蒲生 may refer to:

- Pu Sheng, the original name of Fu Sheng (苻生) (335-357), an emperor of the Chinese/Di state Former Qin
- Gamo (disambiguation), in Japanese
