= Gamo =

Gamo may refer to:

- Gamo (airgun manufacturer), a Spanish airgun manufacturer
- Gamō clan (蒲生氏, Gamō-shi), a Japanese clan which claimed descent from the Fujiwara clan
- Gamo people, an Ethiopian ethnic group
- Gamō, Shiga (蒲生町, Gamō-chō), a former town located in Gamō District, Shiga, Japan
- Gamō Station (蒲生駅, Gamō-eki), a station on the Tōbu Railway located in Koshigaya, Saitama, Japan
- Gamō (surname)
- Gamō-yonchōme Station (蒲生四丁目駅, Gamō-Yonchōme-eki), a train station on the Osaka Municipal Subway Imazatosuji Line and Nagahori Tsurumi-ryokuchi Line
- Spanish frigate El Gamo, an 1801 32-gun Spanish Navy frigate
- Gamo or Gamou, a Serer religious festival
