= List of Tottemo! Luckyman episodes =

Promotional poster, featuring the main trio.

Tottemo! Luckyman is a Japanese anime based on the manga on the same name. A 50-episode anime television series, animated by studio Pierrot and directed by Osamu Nabeshima, was broadcast on TV Tokyo from April 6, 1994, to March 23, 1995.

== Episodes ==
No.	Title	Original release date
1	"Lucky Alien Mantis!"; Transliteration: "Kamakiri Seijin de Rakī!" (Japanese: かまきり星人でラッキー!)	April 6, 1994
2	"Lucky Oldman!"; Transliteration: "Oyajiman de Rakī!" (Japanese: おやじマンでラッキー!)	April 13, 1994
3	"Lucky Birdman!"; Transliteration: "Bādoman de Rakī!" (Japanese: バードマンでラッキー!)	April 20, 1994
4	"Lucky Strongest Baron!"; Transliteration: "Saikyō Danshaku de Rakkī!" (Japanese: 最強男爵でラッキー!)	April 27, 1994
5	"Lucky Beastmaster-man!"; Transliteration: "Mōjūtsukaiman de Rakkī!" (Japanese: 猛獣使いマンでラッキー!)	May 4, 1994
6	"Lucky Geekman!"; Transliteration: "Otakkīman de Rakkī!" (Japanese: オタッキーマンでラッキー!)	May 11, 1994
7	"Lucky Busaikugon!"; Transliteration: "Busaikugon de Rakkī!" (Japanese: ブサイクゴンでラッキー!)	May 18, 1994
8	"Lucky Endeavorman!"; Transliteration: "Doryokuman de Rakkī!" (Japanese: 努力マンでラッキー!)	May 25, 1994
9	"Lucky Thousand-Faced-man!"; Transliteration: "Sengaoman de Rakkī!" (Japanese: 千顔マンでラッキー!)	June 1, 1994
10	"Lucky Strongest Baron Again!"; Transliteration: "Matamata Saikyō Danshaku de Rakkī!" (Japanese: またまた 最強男爵でラッキー!)	June 8, 1994
11	"Lucky Medachi's Transformation!"; Transliteration: "Medachi Henshin de Rakkī!" (Japanese: めだち変身でラッキー!)	June 15, 1994
12	"Lucky Art Alien!"; Transliteration: "Geijutsuseijin de Rakkī!" (Japanese: 芸術星人でラッキー!)	June 22, 1994
13	"Lucky Art Alien Continuation!"; Transliteration: "Geijutsuseijin de Rakkī! no Tsuzuki!" (Japanese: 芸術星人でラッキーのつづき!)	June 29, 1994
14	"Lucky Undiscouraged Strongest Baron!"; Transliteration: "Korizu ni Saikyō Danshaku de Rakkī!" (Japanese: こりずに最強男爵でラッキー!)	July 6, 1994
15	"Lucky Party-Vandal-man!"; Transliteration: "Pātī Arashiman de Rakkī!" (Japanese: パーティー荒らしマンでラッキー!)	July 13, 1994
16	"Lucky Merman!"; Transliteration: "Hangyojin de Rakkī!" (Japanese: 半魚人でラッキー!)	July 20, 1994
17	"Lucky Paparazzo-man!"; Transliteration: "Okkakeman de Rakkī!" (Japanese: おっかけマンでラッキー!)	July 27, 1994
18	"Lucky Debt-Birdman!"; Transliteration: "Shakkin Toriman de Rakkī!" (Japanese: 借金トリマンでラッキー!)	August 3, 1994
19	"Lucky Medachi's Secret!"; Transliteration: "Medachi no Himitsu de Rakkī!" (Japanese: 目立の秘密でラッキー!)	August 10, 1994
20	"Lucky Bombman!"; Transliteration: "Bakudanman de Rakkī!" (Japanese: 爆弾マンでラッキー!)	August 17, 1994
21	"Lucky Covering of Nattō!"; Transliteration: "Nattōzuke de Rakkī!" (Japanese: 納豆づけでラッキー!)	August 24, 1994
22	"Lucky Covering of Nattō Continuation!"; Transliteration: "Nattōzuke de Rakkī no Tsuzuki!" (Japanese: 納豆づけでラッキーのつづき!)	August 31, 1994
23	"Lucky G-5!"; Transliteration: "Jīgo de Rakkī!" (Japanese: G-5でラッキー!)	September 7, 1994
24	"Lucky Cinderella!"; Transliteration: "Shinderera de Rakkī!" (Japanese: シンデレラでラッキー!)	September 14, 1994
25	"Lucky Evil Teacher-man!"; Transliteration: "Gokuaku Kyōshiman de Rakkī!" (Japanese: 極悪教師マンでラッキー!)	September 21, 1994
26	"Lucky Sports day-man!" Transliteration: "Undōkaiman de Rakkī!" (Japanese: 運動会マンでラッキー!)	September 28, 1994
27	"Lucky Edo period!" Transliteration: "Edo jidai de Rakkī!" (Japanese: 江戸時代でラッキー!)	October 13, 1994
28	"Lucky Ninjaman!"; Transliteration: "Ninjaman de Rakkī!" (Japanese: 忍者マンでラッキー!)	October 20, 1994
29	"Lucky Sportsman!"; Transliteration: "Supōtsuman de Rakkī!" (Japanese: スポーツマンでラッキー!)	October 27, 1994
30	"Lucky United Alien!"; Transliteration: "Gattaiseijin de Rakkī!" (Japanese: 合体星人でラッキー!)	November 3, 1994
31	"Reunion! The Three Brothers: Shori, Yujō, and Doryoku"; Transliteration: "Saikai! Shōri, Yūjō, Doryoku Sankyōdai" (Japanese: 再会! 勝利・友情・努力三兄弟)	November 10, 1994
32	"Emergency! Crisis in the Universe!!"; Transliteration: "Hijōjitai! Zen Uchū no Kiki!!" (Japanese: 非常事態! 全宇宙の危機!!)	November 17, 1994
33	"Endeavorman's Past! Betrayal of Brothers"; Transliteration: "Doryokuman no Kako! Anitachi no Uragiri" (Japanese: 努力マンの過去! 兄たちの裏切り)	November 24, 1994
34	"Targeted Hero Committee Chairman!!"; Transliteration: "Nerawareta Hīrō Kyōkai Kaichō!!" (Japanese: 狙われたヒーロー協会会長!!)	December 1, 1994
35	"Attack! The Terrifying Killer Hitman!!"; Transliteration: "Raishū! Kyōfu no Koroshiya Hittoman!!" (Japanese: 来襲! 恐怖の殺し屋ヒットマン!!)	December 8, 1994
36	"Horror! Hand Squadron Finger Rangers!!"; Transliteration: "Kyōfu! Otete Sentai Yubi Renjā" (Japanese: 恐怖! お手手戦隊指レンジャー!!)	December 22, 1994
37	"Now! The Greatest Battle of the Universe!"; Transliteration: "Ima, Hajimaru! Uchū Saidai no Tatakai!!" (Japanese: 今、始まる! 宇宙最大の戦い!!)	January 1, 1995
38	"Shocking! Green Pinkie's True Identity!!"; Transliteration: "Shōgeki! Koyubi Gurīn no Shōtai!!" (Japanese: 衝撃! 小指グリーンの正体!!)	January 1, 1995
39	"Perfect! Speedman Turbo!!"; Transliteration: "Kanzen Karada! Supīdoman Tābo!!" (Japanese: 完全体! スピードマンターボ!!)	January 5, 1995
40	"Second Enemy! Yellow Ring Finger"; Transliteration: "Daini no Teki! Kusuriyubi Ierō" (Japanese: 第二の敵! 薬指イエロー)	January 12, 1995
41	"Third Enemy! Steel Power Duo"; Transliteration: "Daisan no Teki! Kōtetsu Pawā Futarigumi" (Japanese: 第三の敵! 鋼鉄・パワー二人組)	January 19, 1995
42	"Revival! Beautiful Brotherly Love"; Transliteration: "Fukkatsu! Utsukushiki Kyōdai Ai" (Japanese: 復活! 美しき兄弟愛)	January 26, 1995
43	"50 Years of Suffering! The Power of Tofu Geta"; Transliteration: "Kusetsu Goju-nen! Tōfu Geta no Iryoku" (Japanese: 苦節50年! 豆腐ゲタの威力)	February 2, 1995
44	"Blast! Endeavorman's Anger!!"; Transliteration: "Bakuhatsu! Ikari no Doryokuman!!" (Japanese: 爆発! 怒りの努力マン!!)	February 9, 1995
45	"Storm of Blood! Endeavorman's Full Power"; Transliteration: "Chi no Arashi! Doryokuman no Furu Pawā" (Japanese: 血の嵐! 努力マンのフルパワー)	February 16, 1995
46	"Hero Legend! The Tragedy of Geniusman"; Transliteration: "Hīrō Densetsu! Tensaiman no Higeki" (Japanese: ヒーロー伝説!天才マンの悲劇)	February 23, 1995
47	"Showdown! Luckyman vs. Geniusman"; Transliteration: "Taiketsu! Rakkīman tai Tensaiman" (Japanese: 対決! ラッキーマン対天才マン)	March 2, 1995
48	"Brutal! The Most Painful Killing Method!!"; Transliteration: "Zannin! Saikō ni Kurushī Koroshi Kata!!" (Japanese: 残忍! 最高に苦しい殺し方!!)	March 9, 1995
49	"Strong Engemy! The Invincible Reforman"; Transliteration: "Kyōteki! Muteki no Yonaoshiman" (Japanese: 強敵! 無敵の世直しマン)	March 16, 1995
50	"Final Battle! The Strongest Combined Power!!"; Transliteration: "Saigo no Kessen! Saikyō no Gattai Pawā!!" (Japanese: 最後の決戦! 最強の合体パワー!!)	March 23, 1995
