= Matsusaka Castle =

Castle in Matsusaka, Mie, Japan

Coordinates: 34°34′33″N 136°31′33″E

- 松阪城
- Matsusaka, Mie Prefecture, Japan
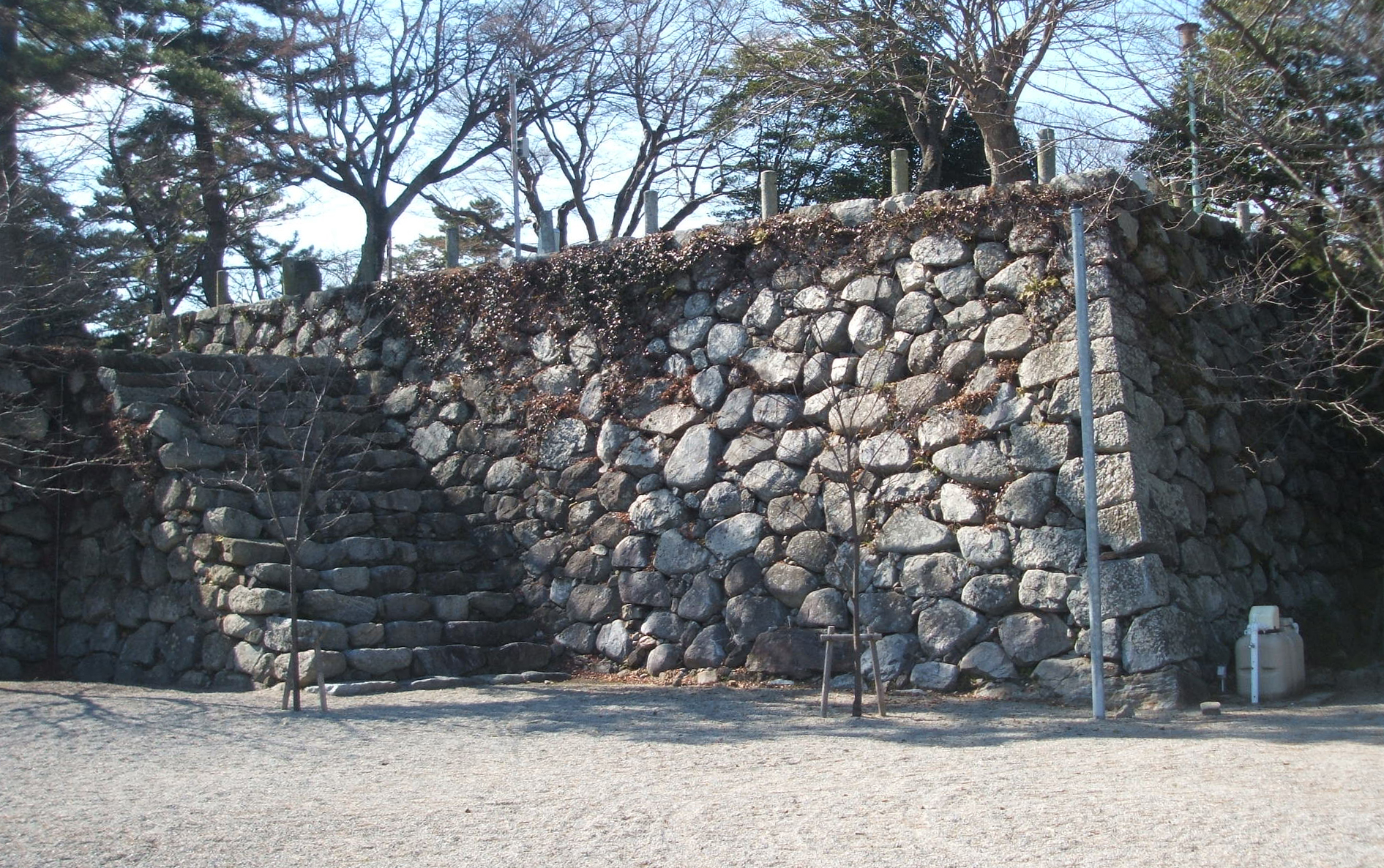
- portion of the foundations of the Main Keep of Matsusaka Castle

Site information
- Type: flatland-style Japanese castle
- Open to the public: yes
- Condition: ruins

Location
- Matsusaka Castle
- Location within Mie Prefecture Location within Japan

Site history
- Built: 1588
- Built by: Gamō Ujisato
- In use: Edo period
- Demolished: 1881

Matsusaka Castle (松坂城, Matsusaka-jō) was a Japanese castle (now in ruins) located in the city of Matsusaka, Mie Prefecture, Japan. Throughout most of the Edo period, Matsusaka Castle was a secondary administrative center for the Kishu-Tokugawa clan, daimyō of Kishū Domain. It has been protected as a National Historic Site since 2011.

== Background ==
Matsusaka Castle is located on the west coast of Ise Bay, in the center of former Ise Province. In addition to the nearby seaport, the castle dominated a land communication junction, where five roads leading to Iga, Yamato Province, Yamato, and Kii Province and the road to Ise Shrine converged. The castle town of Matsusaka prospered by trading, and merchants of Matsusaka were known for their activities nationwide. The founder of Mitsui, one of modern Japan's largest commercial enterprises was born in Matsuzaka.

The castle itself is built on a wedge-shaped hill facing eastward and consists of three layers of terraces. The Honmaru (central bailey) at the top of the hill is a square and held a three-story five-floor tenshu tower with gold roof tiles on its western side, and a yagura watchtower on its eastern side. The middle enclosure also had a large yagura tower, which overlooked the lowest layer of defenses, which was divided into several smaller kuruwa. The core area of the castle is relatively small, measuring roughly 200 meters square, but unusually for the time, most of the walls on all of the enclosures are faced with stone.

== History ==
During the Muromachi period, the area of Matsuzawa was denominated by the Kitabatake clan, who were strong supporters of Emperor Go-Daigo and the Southern Court. However, during the Sengoku period, they were defeated by Oda Nobunaga, who installed his son, Oda Nobukatsu as governor of Ise Province. Oda Nobukatsu initially resided at Tamaru Castle, located ten kilometers south of Matsuzaka, and later relocated to Matsugashima Castle, directly on the Matsuzaka coastline. After the assassination of Oda Nobunaga in 1582, Ise was invaded by the army of Toyotomi Hideyoshi, who installed his general Gamō Ujisato at Matsugashima as daimyō of a 123,000 koku domain. Matsugashima Castle was in a cramped location which did not permit any expansion and was hard to defend, and the existing structures were suffering from salt damage due to their proximity to the coast, so Ujisato relocated his seat further inland, to the current site of Matsusaka Castle. Construction was completed in a very short time, partly through the destruction of local Buddhist temples and an ancient kofun burial mound, to use the stones in the construction of the defensive walls. The inhabitants of Matsugashima were forcibly resettled at the new castle town, and merchants were invited from the Gamō’s former domain in Omi Province. The completed castle had two concentric moats, and a three-roof/five-story tenshu (donjon).

In 1590, after the Battle of Odawara, the Gamō clan was rewarded with a transfer to Aizu-Wakamatsu (600,000 koku). Matsusaka Castle was given to a Toyotomi retainer, Hattori Kazutada. In 1595, the Hattori were purged by Hideyoshi, together with Toyotomi Hidetsugu and the domain was given to Furuta Shigekatsu, with a much-reduced revenue base of 34,000 koku. The castle survived an attack by the forces of Ishida Mitsunari shortly before the decisive Battle of Sekigahara, and Furuta clan was re-confirmed in itsholdings and its kokudaka increased to 54,000 koku by the Tokugawa shogunate.

In 1619, the Furuta clan was transferred to Hamada in Iwami Province, and Matsusaka Domain was abolished, with its territories incorporated into the holdings of the Kishu-Tokugawa clan of Kishū Domain, based in Wakayama. Despite the official policy of “one country-one castle”, the existing fortifications at Matsusaka were not destroyed, but were retained as an administrative center for the domain’s 179,000 koku holdings in southern Ise Province. However, in 1644, the tenshu tower was destroyed by a typhoon, and was not rebuilt. In 1794, a jin'ya fortified residence was built. The Kishu-Tokugawa clan retained the territory until the Meiji Restoration.

In 1877, a fire destroyed the palace within the second bailey, and in 1881 all of the remaining castle buildings were pulled down, with the exception of a single rice warehouse.

== Present situation ==
Although few structures now remain of the original castle, the site is open to the public as a park and the stone walls are in good preservation. In 1982, a proposal to reconstruct the tenshu was vetoed due to local opposition. From 1988-2003, the moats and stonework underwent a massive repair and reconstruction process. During this time, it was discovered that much of the stonework was in the same style as Azuchi Castle.

The castle grounds also hold the modern Matsusaka city hall, city hospital, a local history museum and the Motoori Norinaga Memorial Hall. The castle site is a 15-minute walk from Matsusaka Station

The ruins were listed as one of the 100 Fine Castles of Japan by the Japan Castle Foundation in 2006.

== Gallery ==
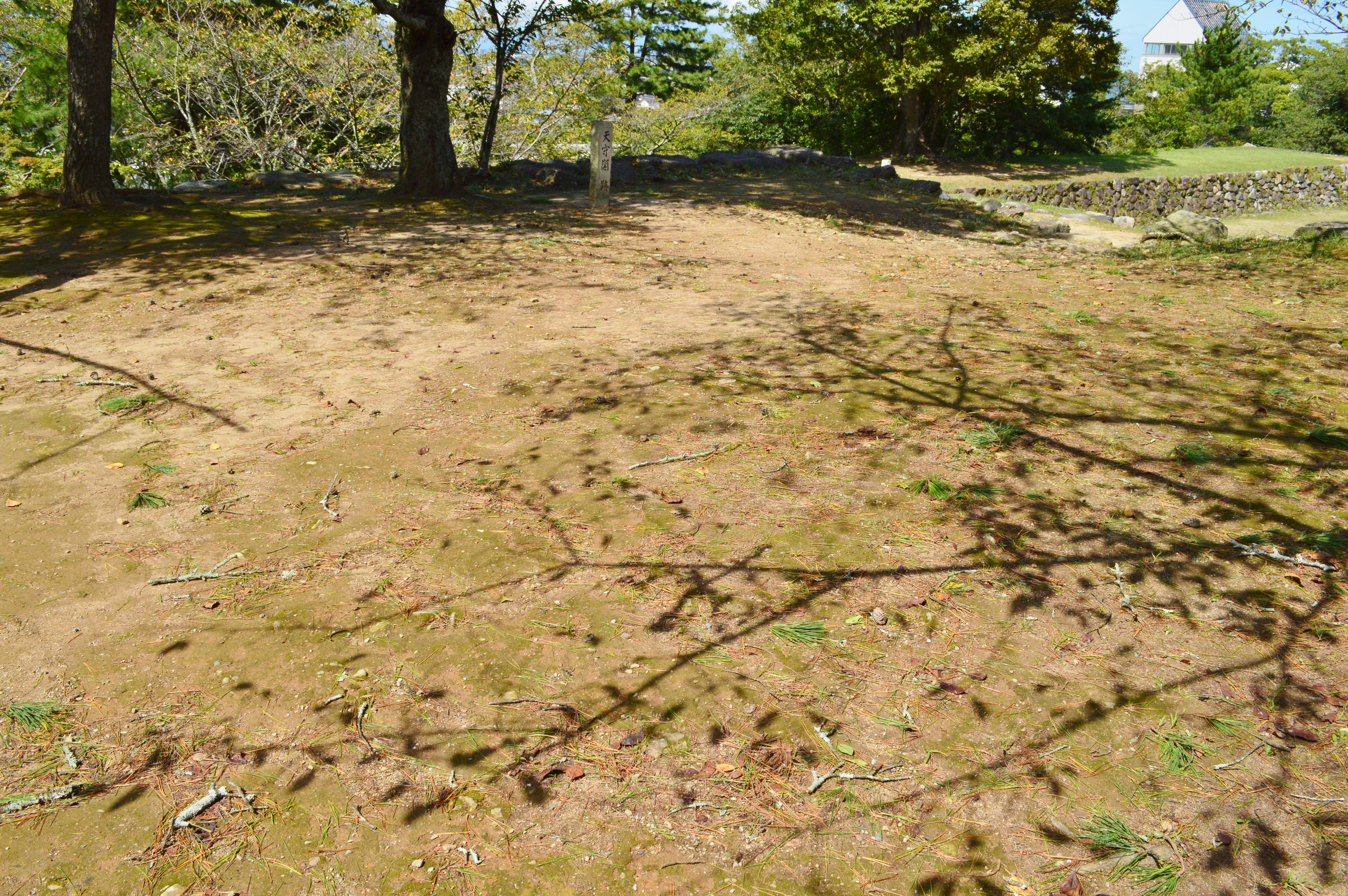
Foundation base for the Tenshu

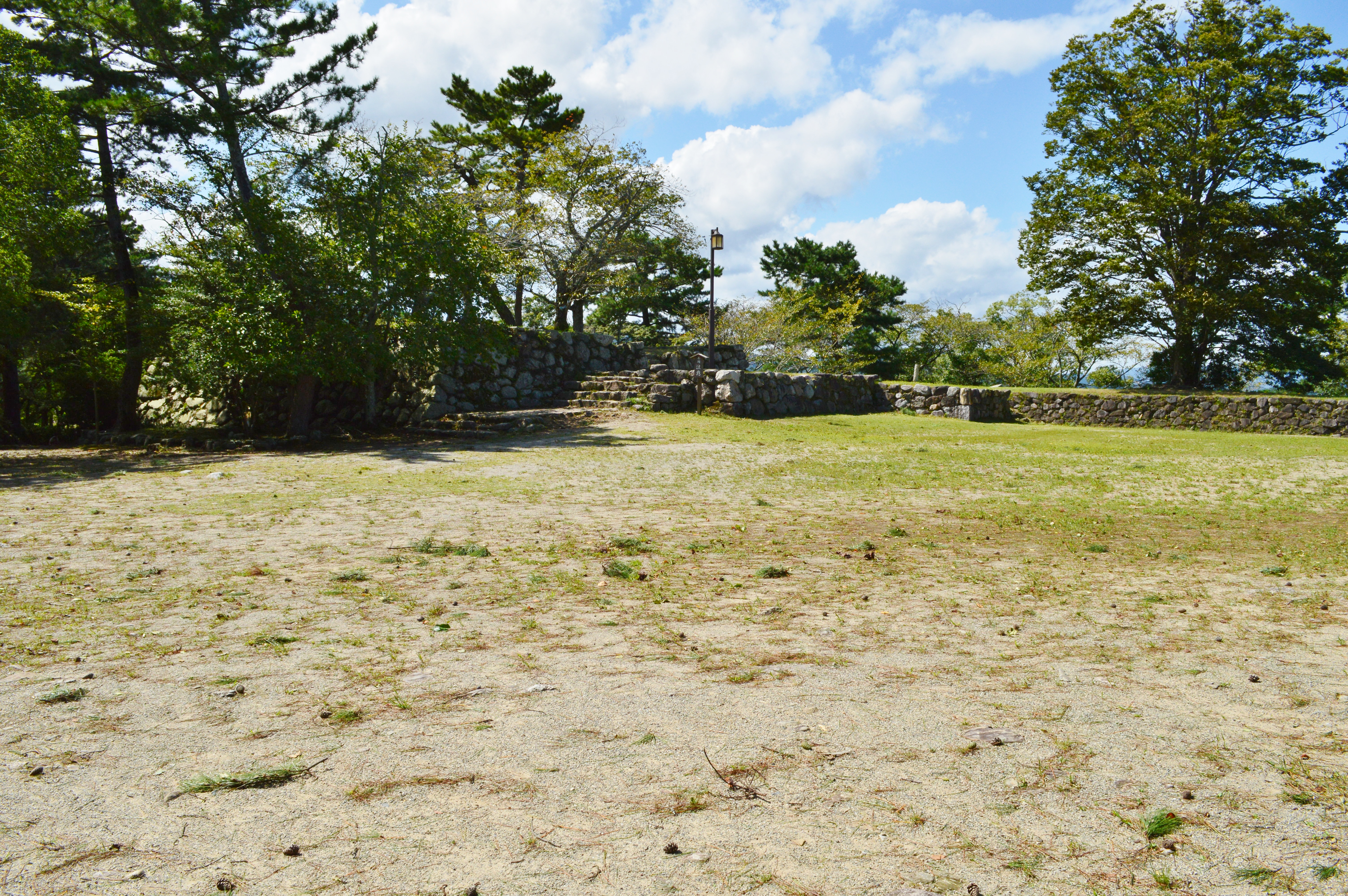
Main Bailey

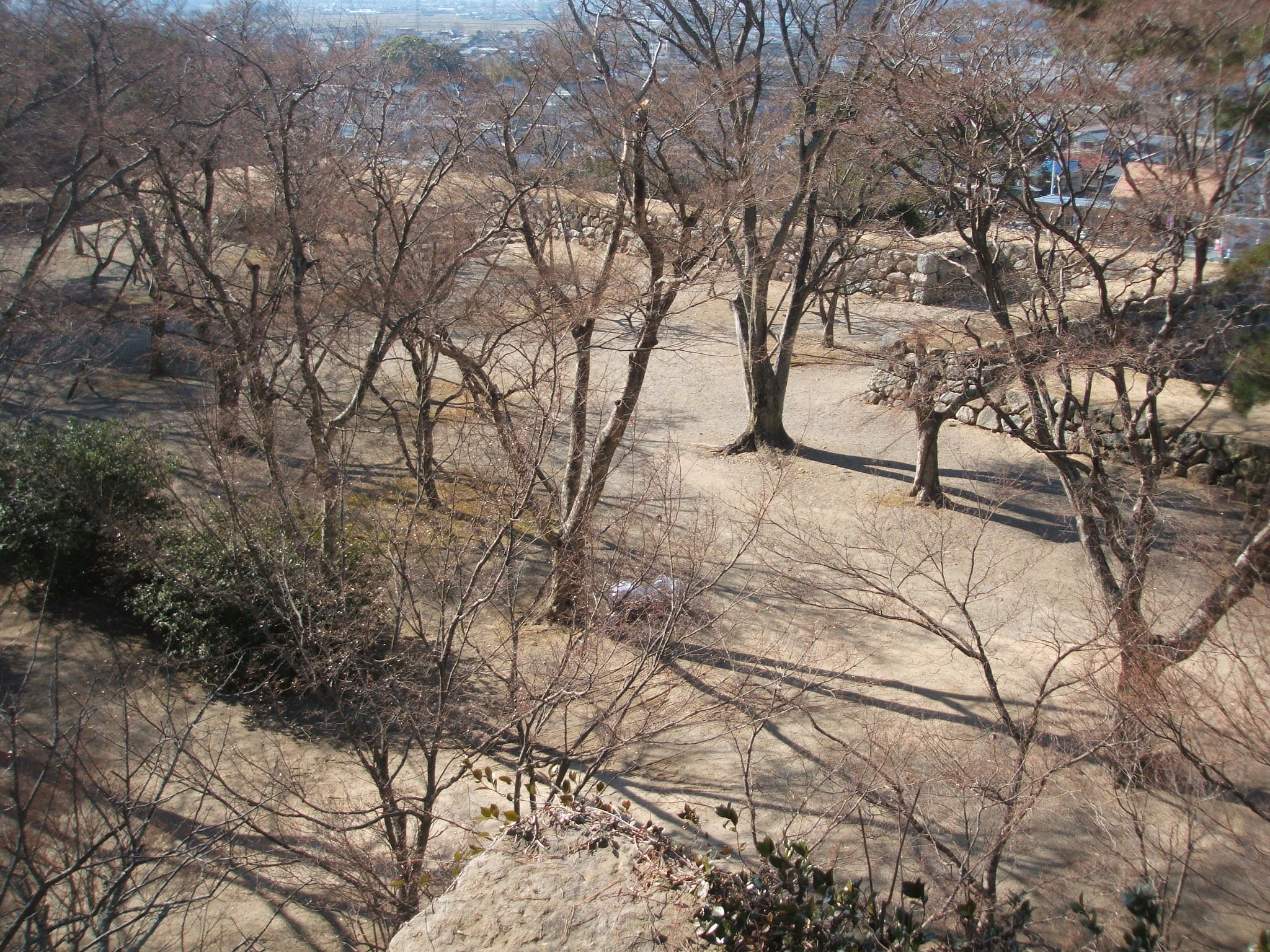
Kitai Enclosure

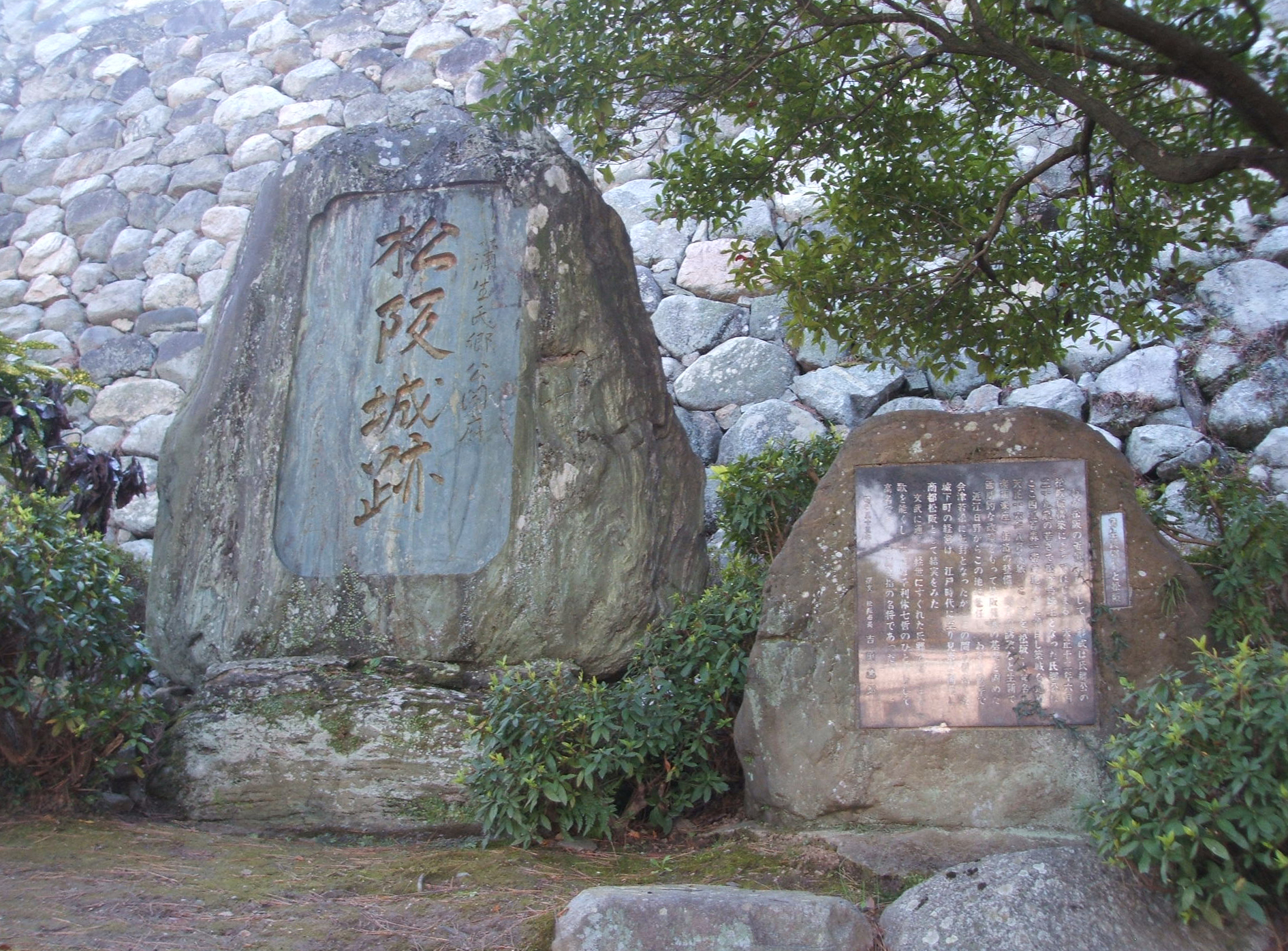
Memorial Stele

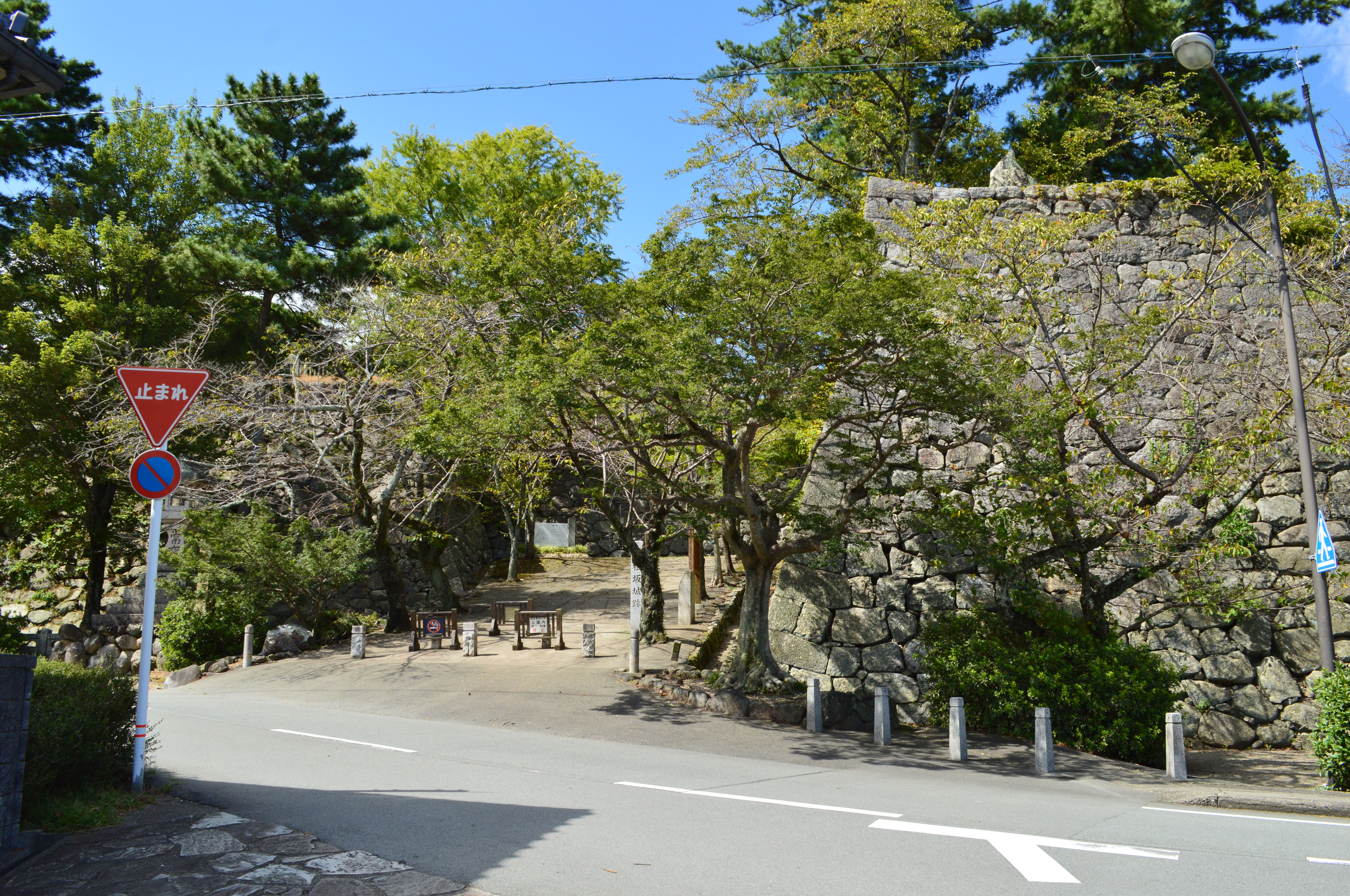
Rear Gate

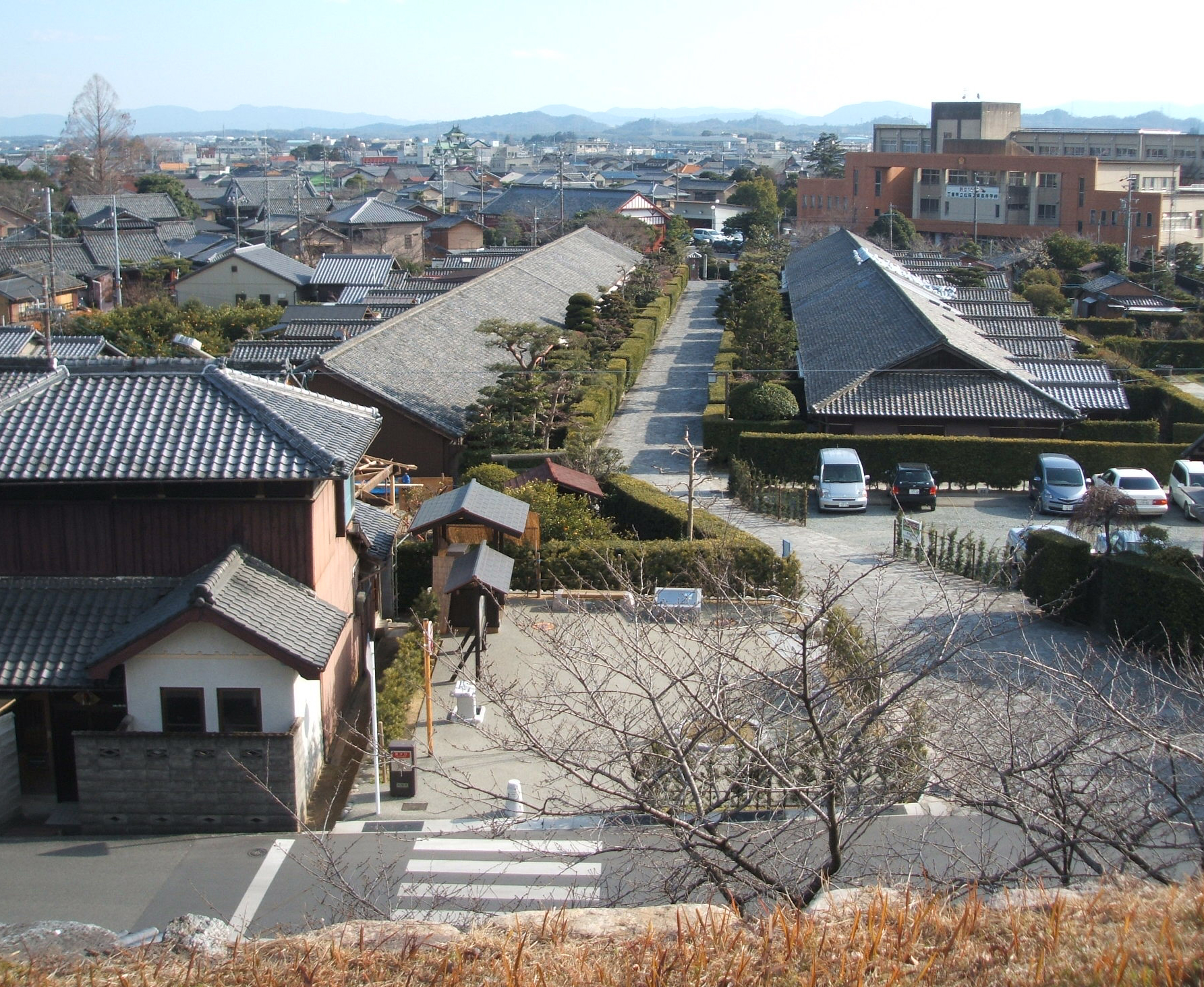
Official's residence

== See also ==
- List of Historic Sites of Japan (Mie)

== Literature ==
- De Lange, William (2021). An Encyclopedia of Japanese Castles. Groningen: Toyo Press. pp. 600 pages. ISBN 978-9492722300.
- Schmorleitz, Morton S. (1974). Castles in Japan. Tokyo: Charles E. Tuttle Co. pp. 144–145. ISBN 0-8048-1102-4.
- Motoo, Hinago (1986). Japanese Castles. Tokyo: Kodansha. p. 200 pages. ISBN 0-87011-766-1.
- Mitchelhill, Jennifer (2004). Castles of the Samurai: Power and Beauty. Tokyo: Kodansha. p. 112 pages. ISBN 4-7700-2954-3.
- Turnbull, Stephen (2003). Japanese Castles 1540-1640. Osprey Publishing. p. 64 pages. ISBN 1-84176-429-9.
