= Gamō Katahide =

Japanese daimyō

Gamō Katahide (蒲生 賢秀, 1534 – May 26, 1584) was a Japanese daimyo of Gamō clan, a family of Christian daimyo from northern Honshu, during the Sengoku period through Azuchi–Momoyama periods. Katahide, the eldest son of Gamō Sadahide, was a retainer of the Rokkaku clan and later Oda clan. His son, Gamō Ujisato, became daimyo of the Aizu Domain and his daughter, Tora known as Sanjo-dono, was one of Toyotomi Hideyoshi's concubine.

In 1568, Oda Nobunaga, who was en route to Kyoto, defeated the Rokkaku clan. Upon the Rokkaku clan's defeat, Katahide as a former influential vassal, pledged loyalty to Nobunaga, and became an Oda retainer. However, the price of Katahide's pledge was giving up his son as a hostage, and so Gamō Ujisato was taken to Gifu, then the Oda clan's headquarters.

In 1570, following the betrayal of Azai Nagamasa, Gamō Katahide assisted in Nobunaga's withdrawal from Kanegasaki by taking him into his own Hino Castle, and facilitating his escape to Gifu from there. In recognition of this feat, Nobunaga gave Katahide and his son a stipend increase, and posted them to southern Omi, under the command of Shibata Katsuie.

== Family ==
- Father: Gamō Sadahide (1508–1579)
- Mother: Mabuchi family's daughter
- Wife: daughter of Goto Katatoyo
- Concubine: Okiri no Kata
- Children:
  - Gamō Ujinobu
  - Gamō Ujiharu
  - Gamō Ujisato by Okiri no Kata
  - Gamō Shigesato
  - Gamō Sadahide
  - Sanjo-dono, become a concubine of Toyotomi Hideyoshi
  - daughter married Ogura Yukiharu
  - daughter married Tamaru Naomasa
  - daughter married Seki Kazumasa
