= Gamō clan =

Gamō 蒲生
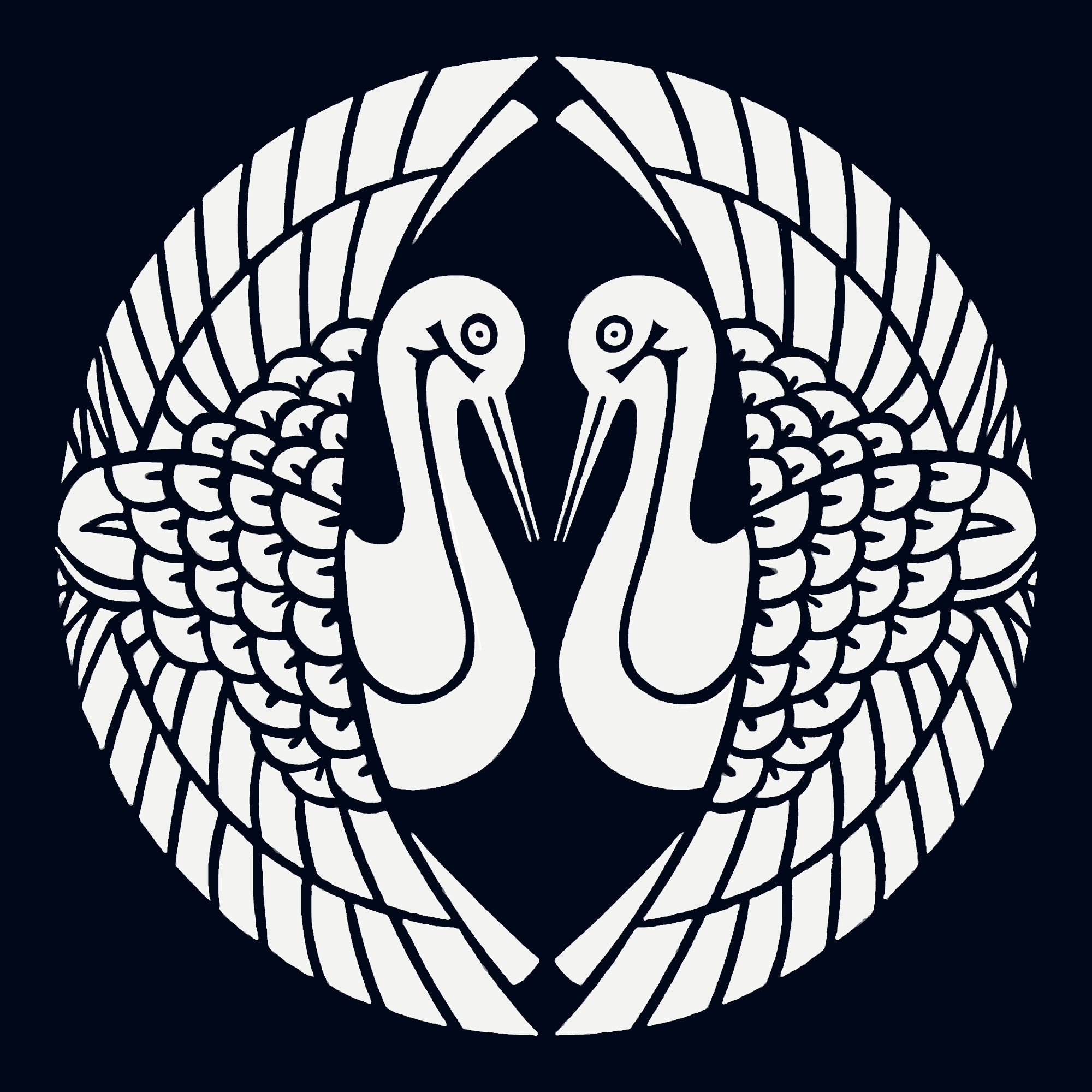
- The emblem (mon) of the Gamō clan
- Home province: Omi
- Parent house: Fujiwara clan
- Founder: Fujiwara no Hidesato
- Final ruler: Gamo Tadatomo
- Ruled until: 1634

The Gamō clan (蒲生氏, Gamō-shi) was a Christian Japanese clan prominent during the Sengoku Period which claimed descent from the Fujiwara clan.

== Gamō clan heads (before taking Gamō name) ==
1. Fujiwara no Hidesato
2. Fujiwara Chitsuji
3. Fujiwara Senkiyo
4. Fujiwara Yorikiyo
5. Fujiwara Yoritoshi
6. Fujiwara Suetoshi

== Gamō clan heads (after taking Gamō name) ==
1. Satoshi
2. Korekata
3. Toshitsuna
4. Toshimune
5. Shigetoshi
6. Ujitoshi
7. Toshitsuna
8. Hideyori
9. Takahide
10. Hidetane
11. Hidekane
12. Hidesada
13. Hidetsuna
14. Sadahide (1444–1514)
15. Hideyuki (d.1513)
16. Hidenori (d.1525)
17. Sadahide (1508–1579)
18. Gamō Katahide
19. Gamō Ujisato
20. Gamō Hideyuki
21. Tadasato (1602–1627)
22. Tadatomo (1604–1634)

=== Gamō Katahide ===
Gamō Katahide (蒲生 賢秀, 1534 – May 26, 1584) was a Japanese daimyō of the Sengoku period through Azuchi-Momoyama Period. Katahide, the eldest son of Gamō Sadahide, was a retainer of the Oda clan.

=== Gamō Ujisato ===
Gamō Ujisato (蒲生 氏郷, 1556 – March 17, 1595) was the heir and son of Gamō Katahide, lord of Hino Castle in Ōmi Province. He later held Matsusaka (Ise Province) and finally Aizuwakamatsu Castle (Aizu Domain) in Mutsu Province. He was the son-in-law of Oda Nobunaga.

=== Gamō Hideyuki ===
Gamō Hideyuki (蒲生 秀行, 1583 – June 13, 1612) was a Japanese daimyō who ruled the Aizu domain. He was the son of Gamō Ujisato. A Catholic, Hideyuki was moved to Utsunomiya (180,000 koku) in Shimotsuke Province after his father died in 1595. In 1600, he was given Aizu, worth 600,000 koku.

=== Gamō Yorisato ===
Gamō Bitchū (蒲生 備中, unknown - October 21, 1600), also known as Gamō Yorisato (蒲生 頼郷), was a samurai of the Gamō clan during the Azuchi-Momoyama Period. Very few details about Gamo Bitchū exist, and historians remain unsure as to whether Gamo was named Yorisato or Satoie. Gamō Bitchū fought at the Battle of Sekigahara with 1,000 Gamō samurai on the Western side. He confronted against Oda Nagamasu Eastern forces. Under the losing forces of Ishida Mitsunari. He died on the battlefield along with the bulk of his men.
