= Gamō Ujisato =

Japanese daimyō

- 蒲生 氏郷
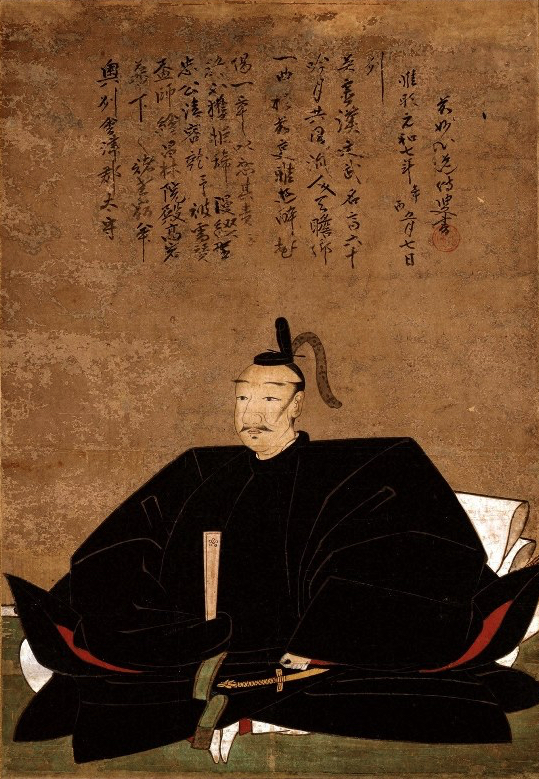

Lord of Hino
- In office 1584–1595
- Preceded by: Gamō Katahide
- Succeeded by: Gamō Hideyuki

Personal details
- Born: 1556 Hino Castle, Ōmi Province
- Died: March 17, 1595 (aged 38–39) Fushimi Castle, Kyoto
- Spouse: Fuyuhime (Nobunaga daughter)

Military service
- Allegiance: Oda clan Toyotomi clan
- Unit: Gamō clan
- Commands: Matsusaka Castle; Tsurugajo Castle
- Battles/wars: Battle of Anegawa; Siege of Odani Castle; Tenshō Iga War; Siege of Kameyama; Siege of Kanie; Kyushu Campaign; Odawara Campaign; Kunohe rebellion

Gamō Ujisato (蒲生 氏郷; 1556 – 17 March 1595) was a Japanese daimyō of the Sengoku and Azuchi–Momoyama periods. He was heir and son of Gamō Katahide, lord of Hino Castle in Ōmi Province, and next managed Ise Province as lord of Matsusaka Castle and finally 920,000 koku in Aizu as lord of Tsurugajo Castle.

Ujisato was favoured by Oda Nobunaga and participated in almost all of his major battles, including those against the Azai and Asakura clans, the Sieges of Nagashima, the Tenshō Iga War and the Battle of Nagashino. After Nobunaga's death, he served Toyotomi Hideyoshi, and took part in all of Hideyoshi's subsequent campaigns: Kyushu Campaign, the Siege of Odawara (1590), the pacification of Ōshū (Mutsu and Dewa Provinces) (1590).

He joined Christianity and was even baptised and given the baptismal name Leon.

He was a disciple of Sen no Rikyū and a first-class tea master, one of The Seven Disciples of Rikyū.

== Life ==
=== Early life ===
He was born in 1556 as the heir to Gamō Katahide, lord of Hino Castle in Ōmi Province. His childhood name was Tsuruchiyo (鶴千代).

The Gamō clan was a senior vassal of the Rokkaku clan, a daimyo in Ōmi Province. However, when Nobunaga Oda entered Kyoto, the Gamō clan left the Rokkaku clan and became vassals of the Oda clan. Tsuruchiyo was then sent to Gifu as a hostage of the Oda clan at the age of 12. Nobunaga recognised Ujisato's qualities at their first meeting and liked his intelligent manner, saying that the sharp look in his eyes showed that he was no ordinary man, and Nobunaga had Ujisato serve close to him.

At the time, Nobunaga took hostages from renowned warlords. (Note: According to the History of Japan, written by the Jesuit missionary Luis Frois, there were more than 100 hostages.) However, when feudal lords took the sons of defeated warlords hostage, it meant that they made them candidates for future executives in their own clans at the time. Ujisato was also not confined and had the opportunity to learn many things freely at Gifu Castle, where he became well educated.

In May 1569, Ujisato reached the manhood (Genpuku) at the age of 14 and used the name Chūzaburō Yasuhide or Masuhide (忠三郎 賦秀). (Note: It is said that Nobunaga gave him one character from his official position name, Danjō-no-Jō (弾正忠), for this Chū (忠).) At that time, Nobunaga served as his eboshi-oya. (Note: Godfather. A person who performs the blessing during the Genpuku ceremony in medieval warrior society.) When Ujisato made his first battle in August of the same year, Nobunaga had him marry his daughter Fuyuhime (冬姫, lit. 'Princess Winter') (Note: This Nobunaga's daughter was conventionally called Princess Winter, but it is now widely believed that this name came from a misreading of historical documents ("Princess married in the winter of Eiroku 12" was misread as "Princess Winter married in Eiroku 12") and is not her real name.) and sent him back to his home town of Hino. This was an exceptional treatment for a hostage. It is speculated that Nobunaga married his daughter off to Ujisato, a contemporary of his heir Nobutada, in order to establish a relationship with him and cement his position as an excellent assistant to support Nobutada and the Oda clan in the next generation. He and Fuyuhime seemed to have been a good marriage, but they had only three children, a small number for a Sengoku daimyo at the time, partly because Ujisato later became a Christian and had no concubines.

=== As a vassal of Nobunaga ===
In 1570, Ujisato became a subordinate of Shibata Katsuie, along with his father Katahide. However, it was not a rigid master-servant relationship, but rather they were under Katsuie's command when taking part in major operations. (Note: This was a method often used by Nobunaga when he took in warlords who originally had their own fiefdoms. He left them free in their own lands in times of peace, and took them under the command of a retainer such as Katsuie only in times of emergency, in order to avoid frustrating their pride.) He took part with his father in the Oda army's attack on the Battle of Anegawa, leading 1,000 of the 5,000 troops under Shibata Katsuie's command as vanguard.

When Shibata Katsuie took charge of the Hokuriku campaign in 1575, the Gamō clan and other Ōmi-shū were separated from Katsuie and the Gamō clan served as hatamoto under Nobunaga's direct command, based at Hino Castle. Nobunaga moved his headquarters to Azuchi in 1576, but like other former Ōmi-shu, the Gamō clan did not move to Azuchi Castle, but remained in their own territory at Hino Castle. Ujisato moved from place to place to fight while learning about governance under his father, and he increasingly acted independently of his father from around 1581.

In 1582, Nobunaga died in the Honnō-ji Incident. At that time, Ujisato rushed to Azuchi Castle and, in cooperation with his father Katahide, who was staying at Castle, evacuated Nobunaga's wives and children to Hino Castle, the residence of the Gamō family, and prepared for an attack by the Akechi forces. Akechi Mitsuhide then sent an emissary to win Ujisato to his side, but he turned him away. Mitsuhide apparently planned to have a detachment attack Ōmi, but he was defeated by Hideyoshi at the Battle of Yamazaki and the Gamo clan was never attacked.

=== Service under Hideyoshi ===
After Nobunaga's death, Ujisato inherited the family estate from his father and became the head of the Gamō family. He served Hashiba (Toyotomi) Hideyoshi, who rose to the centre of the Oda clan after the Kiyosu Conference of 1582. As a result of his exploits in the Battle of Shizugatake in 1583 and Komaki Nagakute in 1584, he was transferred to Matsugashima Castle in Ise Province in 1584 with 120,000 koku. He then built a new castle, Matsusaka Castle, in Yoiho no Mori in 1588. Ujisato had previously been noted for his bravery on the battlefield, but from then on he also demonstrated his talent for managing his domain as a feudal lord.

In 1585, he converted to Christianity and was baptised on the recommendation of Takayama Ukon.

In 1590, Hideyoshi united the country after the destruction of the Hōjō clan in the Siege of Odawara and the new territorial distribution by Ōshū Shioki. Tokugawa Ieyasu was transferred to the Kantō region, which had been ruled by the Hōjō clan, and Ujisato was transferred to Aizu, Ōshū. Although the Tōhoku feudal lords showed some submission to the Toyotomi regime, Hideyoshi gave Aizu to Ujisato as a restraint on them in order to consolidate control over Ōshū, which was still unstable. Aizu was surrounded by major forces such as Date Masamune and Mogami Yoshiaki, who were not to be underestimated, and Ōshū was also an important place to monitor Uesugi Kagekatsu in Echigo and to check Tokugawa Ieyasu in Kanto. Therefore, Hideyoshi, who highly valued Ujisato's abilities, appointed Ujisato as the commander-in-chief of the Toyotomi regime's forces to occupy Ōshū. He was therefore given 420,000 koku to provide him with sufficient troops, later increased to 730,000 koku and eventually given a grand estate of 920,000 koku.

=== Death and subsequent events ===
Ujisato fell ill at Nagoya in Hizen Province, where he was stationed for the Korean campaign, and returned to Aizu in November 1593. The illness worsened and he did not get better. Ujisato went to Kyoto in 1594 and received medical treatment from renowned doctors. However, his condition did not improve and he died at the age of 40 at his residence in Fushimi, Kyoto, in 1595.

After Ujisato's death, his son Gamō Hideyuki inherited the reigns of the family, but the Gamō clan was reduced to 120,000 koku and transferred to Utsunomiya, Shimotsuke Province, due to O-Ie Sōdō. Uesugi Kagesatsu was transferred to Aizu, but was defeated at the Battle of Sekigahara against Tokugawa Ieyasu and was transferred to Yonezawa. Hideyuki joined Ieyasu's side and was given 600,000 koku for his military service and was transferred again to Aizu, but he died prematurely.

== Personality ==
Ujisato was Oda Nobunaga's most promising warlord, and was given as a hostage to the Oda clan at an early age, but his talents were highly valued and favoured by Nobunaga. Nobunaga not only became Ujisato's eboshi-oya, but also made him marry his daughter, Fuyuhime.

After Nobunaga's death, he followed Toyotomi Hideyoshi and was initially a lord of 30,000 koku in Ōmi Hino, but he rose through the ranks under Hideyoshi to 120,000 koku in Ise-Matsusaka and then 420,000 koku in Aizu-Wakamatsu, eventually rising to become a feudal lord with 920,000 koku. At that time, he was the third-ranked kokudaka after Tokugawa Ieyasu and Mōri Terumoto, and it is expected that he would have become one of the Council of Five Elders if he had not died prematurely. However, it is also said that Hideyoshi treated him well in kokudaka but, like Kuroda Kanbei whom he sent to Kyushu, transferred him to Aizu, far from the Kinai, fearing his talent as a military commander and his position as Oda Nobunaga's son-in-law.

He had a diverse ability, well known not only as a military commander of great leadership and valour, but also as a man of culture with a deep knowledge of the tea ceremony and Noh. In the tea ceremony, he is regarded as the first of The Seven Disciples of Rikyū, and is also said to have laid the foundations for the prosperity of the tea ceremony. After Sen no Rikyū was forced to commit seppuku by Hideyoshi, he took in his second wife's stepson, Sen Shōan, and was instrumental in his pardon. (Note: Some historical documents state that Hideyoshi entrusted him to Ujisato.) Later, through the intercession of Ujisato and Ieyasu, Shōan was pardoned and returned to the forefront of the tea ceremony in Kyoto, where his grandson founded the Sansenke (the three Sen families). It is also documented that in 1593 he appeared in a Noh performance at the Imperial Palace organized by Hideyoshi and was well received.

Ujisato also excelled in industrial policy and demonstrated his skills in town revitalisation. Following in the footsteps of Nobunaga, he initiated the Rakuichi Rakuza in Hino and worked to revitalise the town. In Matsusaka and Aizu-Wakamatsu, he also similarly developed the castle towns, stimulating them by promoting commerce and fostering local industry. When he moved to Ise, he built Matsusaka Castle and created a splendid castle town, and issued the Rakuichi Rakuza, inviting Hino merchants from his home town to encourage commerce and industry. He also changed the flow of Ise Kaidō to attract worshippers to Ise Shrine, and is said to have laid the foundations for Matsusaka's development as a merchant town. Ujisato also devoted himself to the development of his own territory in Aizu. When he began building a castle and castle town, he changed the name of the town from Aizu Kurokawa to Aizu Wakamatsu, after the forest of Wakamatsu in his home town of Hino. The residence of the provincial lord was called Kurokawa Castle, but this was also changed to Tsuruga Castle, named after the crane (Tsuru) in the Gamō clan's family crest, and rebuilt into a magnificent castle with a seven-storey keep. (Note: The current Aizu-Wakamatsu Castle is five-storey, but has been restored to the way it was rebuilt in the Edo period) Ujisato brought in lacquer workers from Hino to facilitate the transfer of techniques for Hino-wan, lacquered tableware, which was a speciality of there, and laid the foundations for the production of the craft now known as Aizu lacquerware.

In battle, he, like Nobunaga, preferred to take the battlefield himself, and was once hit by three bullets in his trademark catfish-tailed helmet.

He was a sumo enthusiast and once competed in a sumo tournament presided over by him at the behest of Nobunaga.

== Anecdotes ==
Many of his remaining anecdotes relate to his subordinates. Ujisato held a meeting once a month with all his vassals and allowed them to speak freely regardless of their age or position. It is said that at a time when he was still too low in kokudaka value to offer sufficient bounties, he invited his war-winning vassals to his home and treated them like guests of honour, with dinners he had cooked himself and sake. Then, while the vassals were bathing, they were approached and looked outside, where they saw Ujisato, covered in soot and boiling water with firewood. The vassals were said to have been so moved that they fought for loyalty. When Ujisato hired retainers, he always told them, "Our hatamoto always have a warrior wearing a silver catfish-taled helmet at the front, so do your best not to lose to him". When the newcomers went to the battlefield, it was Ujisato himself who was wearing the catfish-tailed helmet. Ujisato suddenly entrusted one of his troops to a vassal who was laughed at as a coward, over the objections of his other vassals, and contrary to most expectations, he made a major mark. He believed that any person could be useful if he gave them responsibility. It is said that Ujisato once warned his subordinate who had left his post, but when he saw him on his way back, he was gone again, so he immediately cut him down. There is also a theory about this subordinate that he was entrusted with the important catfish-tailed helmet, but he neglected it, so he was cut down. When Ujisato transferred to Aizu, he made Hideyoshi approve of his decision to take in problematic but skilled ronin, such as those who had been issued circulars to avoid being taken in by other daimyo because of their lord's anger. These misfits recognised Ujisato as their lord and played an active role, but after his death, they left the Gamō clan one after another. There is a theory that he was assassinated with poison by Hideyoshi or Ishida Mitsunari due to his death at the young age of 40 and rumours that Hideyoshi had been cautious about him. However, this story is less credible because it appeared in highly adapted historical documents written in later times and because Hideyoshi had a number of highly respected doctors examine him. From treatment records of the time, it is now assumed that one of the internal cancers would have been the cause of his death.

There is an anecdote that Ujisato hired a Roman named Rorutesu, Japanese name: Yamashina Katsunari (山科勝成), to manufacture matchlock guns, sent him to Rome with 12 of Gamō's vassals, and allowed him to continue trading with Rome after his return. The story is written in Goyūhitsu Nikki Shōryaku (1642) by Ōno Yagozaemon, a vassal of the Gamō clan, but it is concluded to be a creation of a later period, as Katsunari does not appear in any other historical documents, it was impossible for him to travel to and from Rome many times with the navigation technology of the time and the language used was new in later times.

== Family ==
- Father: Gamō Katahide
- Mother: Okiri no Kata
- Wife: Fuyuhime (1561–1641)
- Children:
  - Takehime married Nanbu Toshinao by Fuyuhime
  - Sekihime married Maeda Toshimasa by Fuyuhime
  - Gamō Ujitoshi by Fuyuhime
  - Gamō Hideyuki by Fuyuhime

== Representative relics ==
=== Helmets ===
- Namazu-o no Kabuto (鯰尾兜, lit. 'Catfish-tailed helmet') or Kurourushi-nuri Enbi-nari Kabuto (黒漆塗燕尾形兜, lit. 'Black lacquered swallow-tailed helmet') (owned by the Iwate Prefectural Museum).
  - It is said that when Ujisato's daughter, Otake-no-Kata, married Nanbu Toshinao, she brought a helmet worn by Ujisato as a gift. In the battle, Ujisato is said to have worn a Gin Namazu-o no Kabuto (銀鯰尾兜, lit. 'Silver catfish-tailed helmet'). However, the remaining helmet is a swallow-tailed, despite being called catfish-tailed helmet. This is because the helmet is recorded as a catfish-tailed helmet in the ledger of the Nanbu family, which has handed down the helmet. The catfish-tailed helmet worn by Ujisato has not survived, and it is unclear whether the shape of the helmet that Ujisato actually wore was a catfish-tail or swallow-tail.

=== Swords ===
- Aizu Shintōgo sword
  - Sword made by Shintōgo Kunimitsu owned by Gamō Ujisato. The name, "Aizu", refers to the Aizu area which he controlled.

== Notes ==
Preceded by none	Daimyō of Aizu; 1590–1595	Succeeded by Uesugi Kagekatsu
