= Lucky Man (manga) =

Japanese manga series and its adaptations

- First tankōbon volume cover, featuring Luckyman

とっても! ラッキーマン (Tottemo! Rakkīman)
- Genre: Action; Comedy; Superhero
- Manga
- Written by: Hiroshi Gamo
- Published by: Shueisha
- English publisher: Shueisha (digital)
- Imprint: Jump Comics
- Magazine: Weekly Shōnen Jump
- Original run: August 16, 1993 – July 7, 1997
- Volumes: 16
- Anime television series
- Directed by: Osamu Nabeshima
- Produced by: Keisuke Iwata (TV Tokyo); Kyotaro Kimura (Yomiko); Michiyuki Honma (Studio Pierrot)
- Written by: Yoshio Urasawa
- Music by: Yusuke Honma
- Studio: Studio Pierrot
- Original network: TXN (TV Tokyo)
- Original run: April 6, 1994 – March 23, 1995
- Episodes: 50
- Video game

Tottemo! Luckyman: Everyone Loves Lucky Cookie!!
- Developer: Bandai
- Publisher: Bandai
- Platform: Game Boy
- Released: September 22, 1994
- Video game

Tottemo! Luckyman: Lucky Cookie Roulette Assault!!
- Developer: Bandai
- Publisher: Bandai
- Platform: Super Famicom
- Released: June 30, 1995
- icon

Lucky Man, also known as Super! Luckyman and Tottemo! Luckyman (Japanese: とっても! ラッキーマン, Hepburn: Tottemo! Rakkīman; lit. 'Absolutely! Luckyman'), is a Japanese manga series written and illustrated by Hiroshi Gamo. It was serialized in Shueisha's shōnen manga magazine Weekly Shōnen Jump from August 1993 to July 1997, with its chapters collected in 16 tankōbon volumes. The series follows the adventures of a bizarre superhero named Luckyman and his fights against various aliens and other enemies threatening the Earth.

A 50-episode anime television series adaptation by Studio Pierrot was broadcast on TV Tokyo between April 1994 and March 1995. Two video games Game Boy and Super Famicom consoles have been released, and the titular character Luckyman has been featured in the "Jump" crossover video games Jump Ultimate Stars and J-Stars Victory VS.

== Plot ==
Yōichi Tsuitenai is the unluckiest boy in his hometown. One day, his luck truly ran out when he was crushed by an alien spaceship, killing him. But in this time of need, he was discovered by Luckyman, a cosmic superhero, who gives him the superpower of being extremely lucky. Now Yōichi, as Luckyman, must defend the Earth from aliens invading to conquer it, with the help of his sidekick, Endeavorman, their friend Superstarman, and three others, Victoryman, Friendshipman, and Geniusman.

== Characters ==
=== Best 16 Super Heroes ===
The Best 16 Super Heroes (ナイナイシックスティーン, Nai Nai Shikkusutīn), is an elite team of 16 special heroes assembled by the chairman of the Hero Committee, an organization for super heroes, located on a hero-populated planet called the Hero Star. The team is formed up of the main team of six heroes selected by the Chairman as elites to fight aliens on Earth, and 10 contestants from the 1053rd Hero Tournament that all won. "Nai Nai" (ナイナイ) is an onomatopoeia for the sound created when the 16 heroes all fire their beams at something.

Luckyman (ラッキーマン, Rakkīman) / Yoichi Tsuitenai (追手内 洋一, Tsuitenai Yōichi)
Voiced by: Mayumi Tanaka
The luckiest person in the entire universe. Although he is a super hero, he does not actually have any superstrength or superspeed, but instead relies on luck alone to win his fights. All of his attacks are slow, but they end up doing a lot of damage because something lucky always happens. Luckyman needs the presence of a shining star, the Lucky Star, in order for his luck to happen, in other words when it is a cloudy day or when the Lucky Star's presence does not reach him, he gets terrible luck and ends up on the verge of death. Luckyman's appearance is a parody of Ultraman. He has the kanji "daikichi" (大吉; 'great luck') emblazoned on his chest (the top lucky fortune that can be obtained at a Buddhist temple) and has a chabashira (茶柱; 'tea stalk') on his forehead, another Japanese symbol of great luck. In order for Yoichi to transform into Luckyman, he needs to swallow a rakkyō (ラッキョウ; 'Allium chinense'), a special pickled garlic clove infused with the power of good luck (rakkyō sounds like rakkī (ラッキー; 'lucky').
Endeavorman (努力マン, Doryokuman) / Doryoku Sugita (杉田 努力, Sugita Doryoku)
Voiced by: Shigeru Chiba
Luckyman's loyal sidekick and pupil, and always praises Luckyman's work, even though it is because of his luck. He refers to Luckyman as his "master". He wears a pair of geta sandals made out of tofu; however because he concentrated over a thousand bricks of tofu, the sandals are extremely hard and heavy. Also since he wears the sandals everyday, his legs are very fast and strong. He has a red, tear-shaped container on his head which is actually an emergency blood supply, in case he loses a lot of blood.
It was later revealed that he has two big brothers, named Friendshipman and Victoryman. Together, It was also later revealed that unlike Luckyman, who is an earthling, the Doryoku and hits brothers are actually alien super heroes disguised as earthlings, who come from the Hero Planet, a planet full of floating cars and crystalline buildings entirely populated by alien super heroes, and home to the Hero Committee, and its elite team of heroes (later revealed to be called "The Best 16 Super Heroes").
In order for Doryoku to transform into Endeavorman, he needs to write "effort" (努力, doryoku) on a piece of paper and stick it on his chest.
Superstarman (スーパースターマン, Sūpāsutāman) / Tagaru Medachi (目立 たがる, Medachi Tagaru)
Voiced by: Tetsuya Iwanaga
Like Luckyman, is an earthing super hero, that resembles a pop star. He does not have any powers whatsoever, however even though he cannot do anything he still tries to upstage Luckyman and Endeavorman when they are fighting aliens. He was originally a human, but when Luckyman and Endeavorman became famous for fighting aliens, he wanted a piece of the fame too, so he got himself surgery and became Superstarman. He is always beaten to a bloody pulp by enemies and friends alike when he gets too annoying, although for some reason he always recovers, and tries to upstage everyone again. It is revealed later that when he received surgery to become Superstarman, his body's cell regeneration rate got an incredible boost, and instead of his cell dividing from 1 to 2 and 2 to 4 his cells divided at a rate of 1 to 64. Because of this, he is pretty much semi-immortal, since he can heal before anyone can kill him.
In order for Tagaru to transform into Superstarman, he needs to wear a special bow tie that flips his eyes sideways, called a "Medachi Tie".
Victoryman (勝利マン, Shōriman) / Shori Isono (磯野 勝利, Isono Shōri)
Voiced by: Toshiyuki Morikawa
The older brother of both Endeavorman and Friendshipman. He has never lost at anything, be it a fighting match or rock, paper, scissors. He promised himself that the day he loses will be the day he dies. When Endeavorman was a child, Victoryman framed Endeavorman for cheating in a match, but that was only because he promised their mom that he will never allow Endeavorman to become a super hero. He is a great chef when it comes to making pork chops, also he has a pocket with infinite spaces on his back. He has a fear of dumplings ever since Endeavorman tried to make them. The dumplings tasted horrible, however Victoryman did not want to hurt his feelings, so he said he liked them. After that, Endeavorman just kept making them for every meal and Victoryman just kept eating them until finally one day he collapsed, he never touched another dumpling again. There is a tiny, silver man on the winning pedestal on his head named Katsutoshi-kun (勝利くん).
In order for Shori to transform into Victoryman, he needs to make the perfect pork chops and then stick it on his ears.
Friendshipman (友情マン, Yūjōman) / Yujo Atsui (厚井 友情, Atsui Yūjō)
Voiced by: Kazue Ikura
The second older brother of Doryoku. He is extremely friendly and is able to make friends where ever he goes. He usually does not fight himself and gets one of his friends to do all the work for him. When he is forced into a fight he is able to switch to Demon-mode and becomes as strong as Victoryman or Geniusman.
In order for Yujo to transform into Friendshipman, he needs to call up his friends and make them dress him up as his super form.
Geniusman (天才マン, Tensaiman) / Tensai Umaretsuki (生月 天才, Umaretsuki Tensai)
Voiced by: Tomokazu Seki
As his name suggests, he is a born genius, and just as strong. He has a hair cut similar to Cyborg 009, with a moon and star on the right side of his face. The moon and star have the power to completely obliterate anything in its path. He and Victoryman appear to be extreme rivals, on and off the battle field. He was also the leader of the Finger Rangers, Ultramarine Thumb.
In order for Tensai to transform into Geniusman, he needs to say something really, really smart and then a beam of light hits him and he transforms.
Hero Committee Chairman (ヒーロー協会会長, Hīrō Kyōkai Kaichō)
Voiced by: Jōji Yanami
As the name suggests, is the chairman of the Hero Committee, and also a certified super-hero (called "Ultra Hissatsu Special Man"). His eyes, nose and mouth respectively look like the katakana symbols エ, ラ, and イ.
Lonewolf-man (一匹狼マン, Ippiki Okamiman)
A hero who resembles a werewolf, hence his name. Before he became a hero he once got talked into jumping off a cliff by someone who was heavily implied to be Luckyman. After that incident he became distrustful towards everyone around him, until he met Friendshipman. He is the fastest hero in the Best 16 Super Heroes.
Otoko no Ro-man (男のロ・マン)
A completely black-and-white hero that looks like a drawing on a post card. He is considered to be the weakest member of the Best 16 Super Heroes besides Superstarman.
Pashiri No.1 (パシリ1号, Pashiri Ichi-gō)
Voiced by: Kōsuke Okano
Formerly Speedman (スピードマン, Supīdoman), he is a hero who resembles an anthropomorphic rocket. He used to be Green Pinkie of the Finger Rangers. He is later the only surviving member, along with Geniusman. After he lost in a race against Lonewolf-man, nobody allows him to call himself Speedman since he is not the fastest. He became Pashiri No.1 after that.
Sei Raman (聖・ラマン)
Despite her name, she is the sole heroine of the Best 16 Super Heroes. She has hair that looks like the ocean. Her name is a combination of "sei" (聖; 'saint') and "sērā" (セーラー; 'sailor'). She originally entered the hero tournament disguised as a male hero called "Sailor Man", because the tournament originally did not allow women.
Correctionman (修正マン, Shūseiman)
He uses correction fluid to white out injuries on damaged heroes, and occasionally as a weapon. Because of this, he is considered to be the doctor of the Best 16 Super Heroes.
Niceman (ナイスマン, Naisuman)
Considered to be the "nicest guy in the universe". Niceman has a habit of pointing to the "Nice" embossed on his suit.
Topman (トップマン, Toppuman)
Wears crowns all over his body. He is often considered Niceman's rival, and vice versa.
Spademan (スペードマン, Supēdoman)
He uses cards as his weapon. He was once pitted against Friendshipman in a fight but rather than hand to hand combat, Spademan challenged him to a game of Old Maid instead. By recruiting Luckyman into his team and using his luck, Friendshipman easily won against Spademan. However, Spademan argues that the match was just practice and that the next game is the real one. Friendshipman keeps winning the following matches and Spademan keeps using the same excuse to continue the match. The match soon turned into a game of endurance where both players could not eat or sleep. When Friendshipman gave him the correct card he needed to win, he fell unconscious. Friendshipman lost the card game, but won the fight. Spademan can sometimes predict the future using his cards, but it rarely works.
Saviorman (救世主マン, Kyūseishuman)
A ninja-like hero that came from the other side of the universe. He has the ability to create black holes in which he uses to imprison opponents and as a portal for teleportation.
World Reformer-man (世直しマン, Yonaoshiman) / Yotchan (よっちゃん)
Voiced by: Chafurin
Originally an alien that came from a poverty filled planet, his family was killed 300 million years ago. Since then, he wears an armor in order to hide the scars that he got on his home planet. He was originally a righteous hero, and was friends with who is now known today as the Hero Committee Chairman, but betrayed the Hero Committee when his friend was chosen as the chairman and not him. He was killed after a battle with Luckyman inside a rocket that hurdled towards the sun. He was brought back to life as "Reforman SZG", and became friends with the Chairman again. Throughout half of the series, he wore a disguise and called himself "Yotchan", and claimed his place as the main super villain of the series.

=== Other characters ===
Lucky-wan (ラッキーワン, Rakkīwan)
Voiced by: Toshiharu Sakurai
Luckyman's pet super-dog. Like his master, he does not have much fighting power either, and relies on his luck to win. He briefly appeared before being permanently replaced by Endeavorman as Luckyman's sidekick.
Hishoka (ひしょ香)
Hero Committee Chairman's secretary. She has a huge crush on Geniusman.
Three-Pillars-man (三本柱マン, Sanbonbashiraman)
Voiced by: Chafurin
Father of Doryoku, Shori, and Yujo. He looks like a combination between the three brothers.
Slimeman (スライムマン, Suraimuman)
A hero made of green slime that, like all the other members of Yotchan's team, are actually villains. He is also Yellow Ring Finger of the Finger Rangers.
Powerman (パワーマン, Pawāman)
A very big and strong villain who plays it rough. He is also Blue Middle Finger of the Finger Rangers.
Steelman (鋼鉄マン, Kōtetsuman)
A rather small, cylindrical villain made out of steel, who can dig very deep for minerals. He is also Red Index Finger of the Finger Rangers.
Miyo Kireida (奇麗田 見代) Mitchan (みっちゃん)
Voiced by: Naoko Matsui
A little girl from the school Yoichi goes to. Because Yoichi is unlucky, Mitchan hates him, but loves him when he is Luckyman.
Desuyo Busaiku (不細工 です代, Busaiku Desuyo)
Voiced by: Urara Takano
Another girl from Yoichi's school, who is rather big and ugly in appearance, in contrast to Mitchan. Also unlike Mitchan, Desuyo is absolutely in love with Yoichi. This is another sign of Yoichi's bad luck.
Ikuzou Mini (身仁 育三)
Voiced by: Chafurin
A greengrocer he supports Luckyman with Umatarou and Gakudai.
Umataro Yaji (屋治馬駄朗, Yaji Umatarō)
Voiced by: Kenichi Ogata
Owner of a ramen shop.
Yamerō Tsuitenai (追手内 止郎, Tsuitenai Yamerō)
Yoichi's father.
Iyayo Tsuitenai (追手内 伊八代, Tsuitenai Iyayo)
Yoichi's mother

=== Hand Squadron Finger Rangers ===
The Hand Squadron Finger Rangers (お手手戦隊指レンジャー, Otete Sentai Yubi Renjā) are the five villains in Yotchan's team. They fight in cylindrical metal suits, each of a different color, and act as fingers for a giant hand. Eventually, these characters all die, except for Geniusman, Speedman, and Yotchan.

Ultramarine Thumb (親指グンジョー, Oyayubi Gunjō)
Leader of the Finger Rangers. He wears an ultramarine suit and acts as the thumb.
Green Pinkie (小指グリーン, Koyubi Gurīn)
Pashiri No.1. He has a green suit and acts as the pinky finger.
Yellow Ring Finger (薬指イエロー, Kusuriyubi Ierō)
Slimeman. He has a yellow suit and acts as the ring finger.
Red Index Finger (人差し指レッド, Hitosashiyubi Reddo)
Steelman. He has a red suit and acts as the index finger.
Blue Middle Finger (中指ブルー, Nakayubi Burū)
Powerman. He has a blue suit and acts as the middle finger.

== Media ==
=== Manga ===
Written and illustrated by Hiroshi Gamo, Tottemo! Luckyman debuted with a one-shot in Shueisha's shōnen manga magazine Weekly Shōnen Jump on April 12, 1993, and was later serialized in the same magazine from August 16 of that same year to July 7, 1997. Shueisha collected its chapters in sixteen tankōbon volumes published between February 1994 and October 1997. Shueisha re-published the series in eight digital volumes, released on June 29, 2012.

Shueisha began publishing the manga in English, under the title Super! Luckyman, on its Manga Million digital platform in 2026.

=== Anime ===
A 50-episode anime television series, produced by Studio Pierrot and directed by Osamu Nabeshima, was broadcast on TV Tokyo from April 6, 1994, to March 23, 1995.

=== Video games ===
A video game, titled Tottemo! Luckyman: Everyone Loves Lucky Cookie!! (とっても! ラッキーマン ラッキークッキーみんな大好きー!!, Tottemo! Rakkīman: Rakkī Kukkī Minna Daisukī!!; "Absolutely! Luckyman: Everyone Loves Lucky Cookie!!"), was developed by Bandai and released for the Game Boy on September 22, 1994. Another video game, titled Tottemo! Luckyman: Lucky Cookie Roulette Assault!! (とっても! ラッキーマン ラッキークッキールーレットで突撃ー!!, Tottemo! Rakkīman: Rakkī Kukkī Rūretto de Totsugekī!!; "Absolutely! Luckyman: Lucky Cookie Roulette Assault!!"), also developed by Bandai, was released for the Super Famicom on June 30, 1995.

Luckyman was featured as a playable character in two Jump crossover fighting games, Jump Ultimate Stars for the Nintendo DS, released on November 23, 2006; and J-Stars Victory VS for the PlayStation 3, PlayStation 4 and PlayStation Vita, released on March 19, 2014, in Japan, and in June 2015 in Europe and North America.
