= Hiroshi Gamo =

Japanese manga artist

Hiroshi Gamo ガモウひろし
- Born: August 17, 1962 (age 64) Tokyo, Japan
- Area: Manga artist
- Notable works: Tottemo! Luckyman

Hiroshi Gamo (Japanese: ガモウひろし, Hepburn: Gamō Hiroshi; born August 17, 1962) is the pen name of a Japanese manga artist known for his works in the magazine Weekly Shōnen Jump. His most famous work is the gag manga series Tottemo! Luckyman.

== Notable works ==
- Rinkiōhenman (臨機応変マン) – published in Jump Comics for 4 volumes, 1986-88
- Suupaa Booyaken-chan (スーパーボーヤケンちゃん) – published in Jump Comics for 2 volumes, 1989
- Toraburu Kanchu ki (トラブル昆虫記) – one-shot in Weekly Shonen Jump, 1990
- Tottemo! Luckyman (とっても! ラッキーマン) – serialized Weekly Shonen Jump 1993–1997; published in Jump Comics for 16 volumes
- Countdown hero 21st century man (COUNT DOWN ヒーロー21世紀マン) – serialized in Weekly Shonen Jump, 2 issues, 1998
- Boku wa Shōnen Tantei Dan (ぼくは少年探偵ダン!!) serialized in Weekly Shonen Jump, 1998–99; published in Jump Comics for 2 volumes, 1999
- Bonjūru jin de bōn! ! (ボンジュール ジンでボーン!!) – serialized in Weekly Shonen Jump, 2 issues, 2000
- Bakabakashiino! (バカバカしいの!) – serialized in Weekly Shonen Jump, 2000-01
- Detaa~h Wantsuu Pantsu-kun (でたぁーっ わんつーぱんつくん)
- Gamouhirosh Yose Atsumei (ガモウひろし寄せ集め) – published in Shueisha Bunko for 2 volumes, 2009
