= Gamō Hideyuki =

Gamō Hideyuki (蒲生 秀行, 1583 – June 13, 1612) was a Japanese daimyō who ruled the Aizu domain. He was the son of Gamō Ujisato. A Catholic, Hideyuki was moved to Utsunomiya (180,000 koku) in Shimotsuke Province after his father died in 1595.

In 1600, he was given Aizu, worth 600,000 koku. This had been part of his father's fief. His wife was third daughter of Tokugawa Ieyasu, Furihime.

Hideyuki's eldest son Tadasato succeeded him in 1612.

== Family ==
- Father: Gamō Ujisato
- Mother: Fuyuhime (1561–1641)
- Wife: Furi-hime (1580–1617)
- Children:
  - Gamo Tadasato (1602–1627) by Furihime
  - Gamo Tadatomo (1604–1634) by Furihime
  - Yorihime (1602–1656) married Katō Tadahiro by Furihime

| Preceded by Gamō Ujisato | 2nd Daimyō of Aizu (Gamō); 1595–1598 | Succeeded by Uesugi Kagekatsu |
| Preceded by none | 1st Daimyō of Utsunomiya (Gamō); 1598–1601 | Succeeded by Okudaira Iemasa |
| Preceded by Uesugi Kagekatsu | 1st Daimyō of Aizu (Gamō); 1601–1612 | Succeeded by Gamō Tadasato |
