= Ikki =

Ikki may refer to:

- Ikki, revolts against samurai rule in 15th and 16th century Japan
  - Ikkō-ikki, ikki revolts organized by Jōdo Shinshū Buddhists
    - Kaga ikki, an Ikkō-ikki break-away warrior and peasant confederacy based in Kaga Province
    - Saika Ikki, a Buddhist warrior group based in Ōta, Kii Province
  - Yamashiro ikki, a warrior and peasant confederation in Yamashiro Province
  - Iga ikki and Kōka ikki, confederations of ninja families in the respective regions of Iga Province and Kōka District. These formed an alliance together.
  - Oyamato ikki, a warrior and peasant confederation in the Oyamato District of Ise Province
- Monthly Ikki, a semi-alternative seinen manga magazine published by Shogakukan
- Ikki (video game), an arcade game released by Sunsoft in 1985
- IKKI, the Russian acronym for Executive Committee of the Communist International

== Fictional characters ==
- Ikki, a character from the animated television series The Legend of Korra
- Ikki Tenryou, a character from the manga and anime Medabots
- Ikki, a porcupine in Rudyard Kipling's List of The Jungle Book characters#In the Mowgli stories
- List of Air Gear characters#Itsuki Minami, a character from the manga and anime Air Gear
- List of Kamen Rider Revice characters#Ikki Igarashi, one of the main characters of the tokusatsu series Kamen Rider Revice

== People ==
- Ikki (given name), a Japanese masculine given name
- Ikki Twins (born 1981), American models and TV personalities
