= Tateoka =

Tateoka may refer to:

- Soichiro Tateoka (born 1990), a Japanese baseball player
- Tateoka Doshun (Sengoku Period), a legendary ninja from the Iga ikki
