= Iga–Kōka alliance =

Japanese ninja confederation (c. 1487–1574)

- Formation: c. 1487
- Founded at: Iga Province; Kōka District
- Dissolved: March 27, 1574
- Headquarters: Iga–Kōka border
- Location: Sengoku period Japan
- Origins: Iga ikki Kōka ikki
- Affiliations: Rokkaku clan

In the Sengoku period of Japan, the adjacent Iga ikki and Kōka ikki, self-governed military confederations of ninja families in the respective regions of Iga Province and Kōka District, frequently allied in mutual defense against outside military threats. The alliance is first attested in 1487 at the Battle of Magari. A constitutional document with an approximate date of 1560, and attributed to Iga, formalized the alliance between Iga and Kōka. Governance of the alliance, as specified in the constitutional document, constituted of 10 military commissioners (bugyo) from Iga and 12 from Kōka, who would meet along the border of the two ikki. The alliance of the two ikki was effectively terminated when Kōka surrendered to the forces of Oda Nobunaga on March 27, 1574.

== Background ==
Iga Province (center), the territory of the Iga ikki.

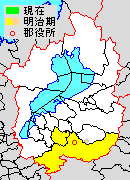
Kōka District (marked in yellow), the borders of which constituted the territory of the Kōka ikki, within Omi Province

In Japan in the 15th through 16th century, Iga Province contained some 300-500 small estates and 700 castles and nearby Kōka, in southern Ōmi Province, had some 53 clans. In the opening of the 15th century, both regions were in anarchy, the numerous estates and families constantly engaged in low-level, small-scale feuds and squabbles with each other both within and between each region. In Iga, fighting had been constant from at least the late 13th century. Bandits also frequently raided the local monasteries. In addition to the banditry, constant external threats posed by incessant warfare that broke out in the region in the 14th century necessitated that the local jizamurai (military officials of peasant class tasked with military administration) ally together and develop specialized combat, espionage, and guerilla warfare skills in order to restore peace and order to the province. By 1477, Iga Province was known for rejecting the authority of the military governors – shugo – appointed by the shogun, and by around 1500 they had formed an ikki – a "league". Kōka also formed a similar league. The armies formed by Iga and Kōka, in the late 1580s and early 1600s, retrospectively became known by the term shinobi, specifically shinobi-mono, and still later known as ninjas.

In Iga, instead of a local daimyo (a warlord from the military aristocracy) replacing the shugo, leadership remained divided among the jizamurai. Iga ikki essentially functioned as a province-wide sō. Sō were individual villages banded together for mutual aid and military defense, similar to a European medieval commune. Typically, including in Iga, the leadership of sō consisted of kokujin (an alternate term for the jizamurai) and the dogō (villagers) and lesser farmers.

In Kōka, the jizamurai organized in a similar ikki pattern to that in Iga, and the high-ranking families, although technically of peasant class, acted as the barons of the district. Some 53 clans in the district ruled as the elders of the Kōka confederation. These composed the Kōka-gun Chūsō (General Assembly of Kōka District), the governing assembly of, and historical expression for, the Kōka Confederacy. Each of these families in the assembly ruled over a sō. These districts then sometimes were themselves part of higher level sō, and all of these sō then formed the overarching sō that was Kōka ikki.

== Governance ==
External danger of invasion from daimyo, particularly those in the surrounding territorial vicinity of the two ikki, threatened the confederated social order that the jizamurai created. In order to consolidate their authority, the families in Iga reached out to Kōka, immediately adjacent to the north, to form an alliance. By 1487, the two confederations were jointly participating in military operations. At some point between 1552 and 1568, a constitutional document that is attributed to Iga by historians formalized the alliance. To govern the alliance, bugyō (military commissioners) from each ikki, 10 from Iga and 12 from Kōka, would gather at the border of the two regions to hold "field meetings" where they discussed strategy and other important affairs of importance to both ikki. The area of choice was probably in the vicinity of present-day Yono Park in Iga City. The Russian economist Vladimir V. Maltsev hypothesizes that the alliance between the provinces ended the centuries of feuding between them and thus enabled them to jointly profit from a highly lucrative mercenary market.

== History and joint military campaigns ==
=== Battle of Magari ===
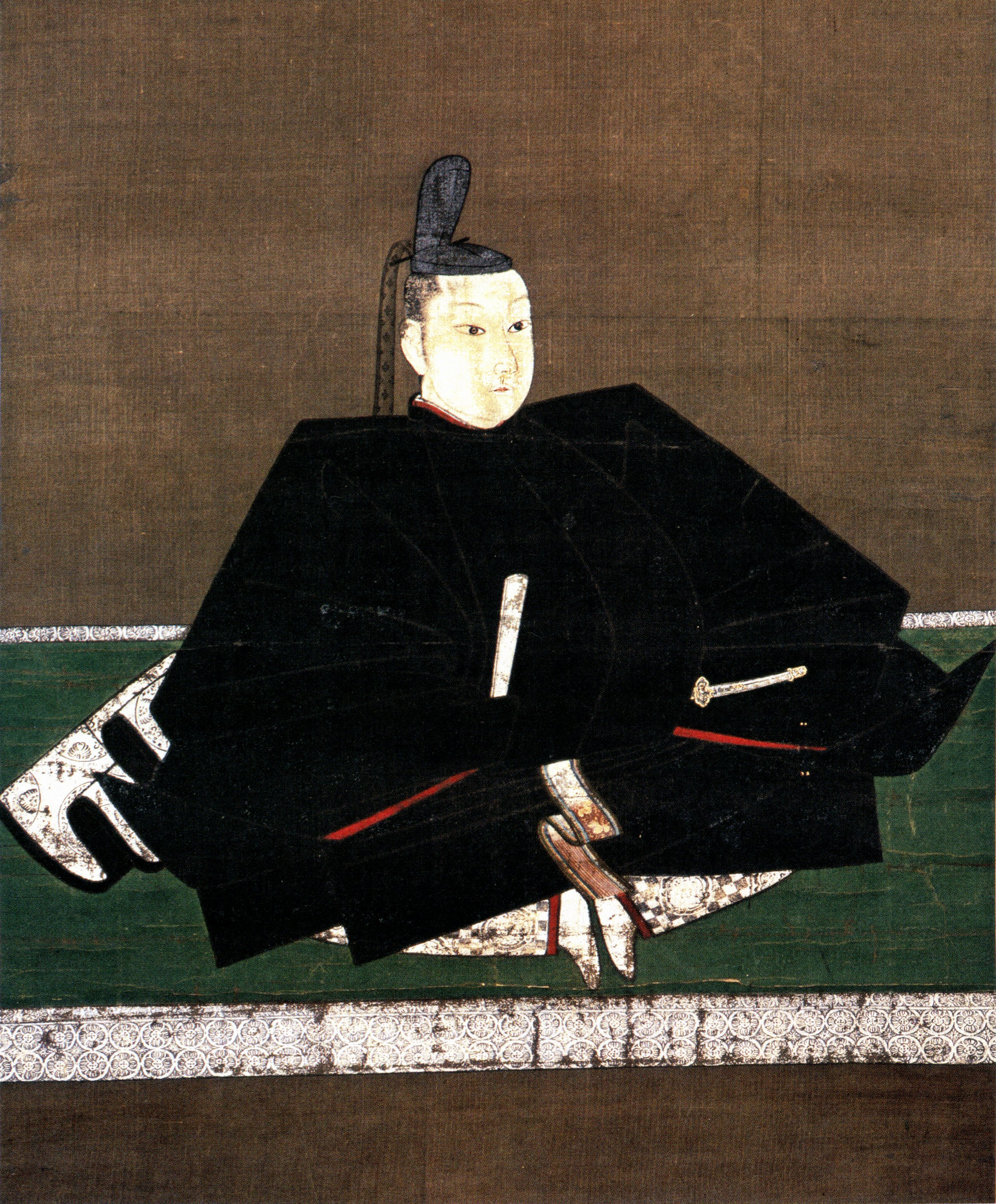
Shogun Ashikaga Yoshihisa, who was wounded and defeated in 1487 at Magari by the Rokkaku clan and the Iga–Kōka alliance. His wounds might have contributed to his early death in 1489.

The first documented joint operations between Iga and Kōka were in 1487, when ninja from Iga and Kōka gained significant fame due to their actions at the village of Magari (today party of Rittō, Shiga). The Kōka shugo (military governor), Rokkaku Takayori, was aggressively raiding the territory of his neighbors. In response to these depredations, the shogun Ashikaga Yoshihisa attacked Takayori. At Magari, Iga and Kōka ninja fought on the side of Takayori. The Iga and Kōka units harassed Yoshihisa's army with guerilla warfare, hit-and-run tactics, and night attacks. Yoshihisa was wounded during this campaign, and those injuries might have contributed to his death from illness two years later. The 53 ninja families in Kōka who participated in the conflict were formally recognized by Takayori as the "Kōka 53", and 21 of these families were given special recognition for their service, including retainership and permission to bear surnames and own swords.

=== Joint actions in the mid-1500s ===
By the mid-1500s, the services of ninja from Iga and Kōka were in high demand, in use by at least 37 surrounding areas. On December 15, 1541, the shogun in Kyoto sent a letter to Iga's governor requesting that the province assist Tsutsui Junshō (from the adjacent Yamato Province) in his siege of Kasagi Castle in Yamashiro Province, Japan's capital region. In the morning of December 23, 1541, 70–80 ninja agents from Iga and Kōka infiltrated the castle, set fire to the settlement, and captured the first and second baileys. Two days later, the armies inside Kasagi sallied out and were defeated, after which the ninjas dispersed.

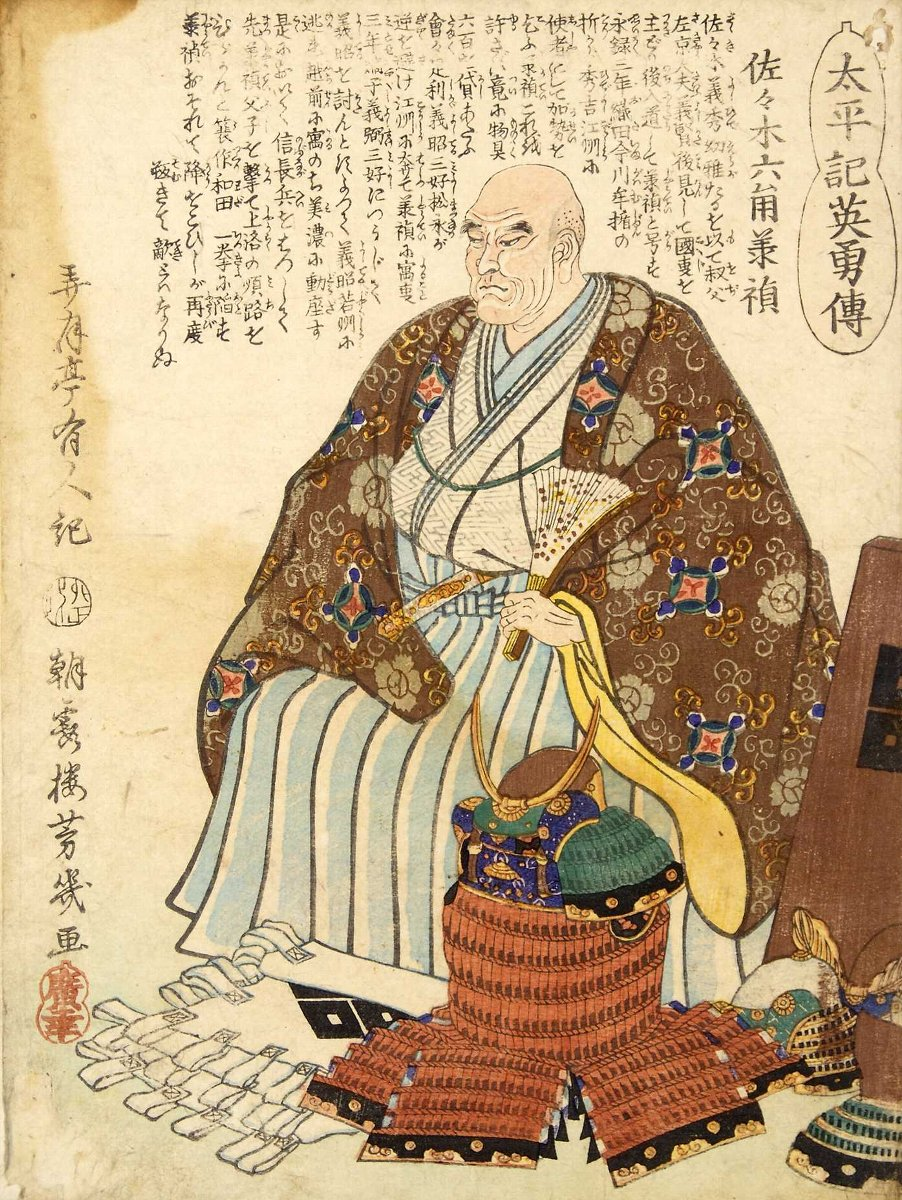
Rokkaku Yoshikata, a powerful ally of the alliance.

The Bansenshūkai, an early Edo period document compiled in 1676 by a member of the Fujibayashi family, alleges an incident from 1558 regarding a ninja commander, Tateoka Doshun, from Iga leading a combined force of Iga and Kōka soldiers against Sawayama Castle. However, according to the historian Stephen Turnbull, this account is full of errors, and accounts not derived from the Bansenshūkai do not mention ninja, let alone Tateoka Doshun, at all. Per the account, Rokkaku Yoshikata was campaigning against an alleged rebel retainer, Dodo Oki-no-Kami Kuranosuke, and besieged him. After many days of unsuccessful siege, Yoshikata employed to aid him. Doshun led a team of 44 Iga ninja and 4 Kōka ninja who carried lanterns Doshun had made with replicas of Dodo's mon (family crest). They entered the gates of the castle without opposition and then set fire to the castle. They escaped successfully and in the ensuing panic Yoshikata was able to capture the castle. According to Turnbull, contrary to the account, Dodo in actuality was a retainer of the Rokkaku's enemies, the Azai clan, and when Yoshikata invaded Northern Omi Province in 1559, Dodo was ordered by Azai Nagamasa to hold Sawayama. The historian and travel writer John Man, on the other hand, takes the account at face value and cites this as an example of the fame of the ninjas and of them offering their services for hire.

=== Formalized alliance ===
At an approximate date of 1560, the alliance between Iga and Kōka was formalized in constitutional document. Exactly how long the document was extent and how widely it applied to the villages is unknown, as is its specific provenance or date of origin. It was preserved in Kōka by the Yamanaka family but was attributed to Iga by the historian Ishida Yoshihito because it refers to a "self-governing league" – sokoku ikki – which is what Iga referred to itself as. Based on references within the document, Yoshihito deduced that it was composed between 1552 and 1568.

=== Resistance against Nobunaga ===
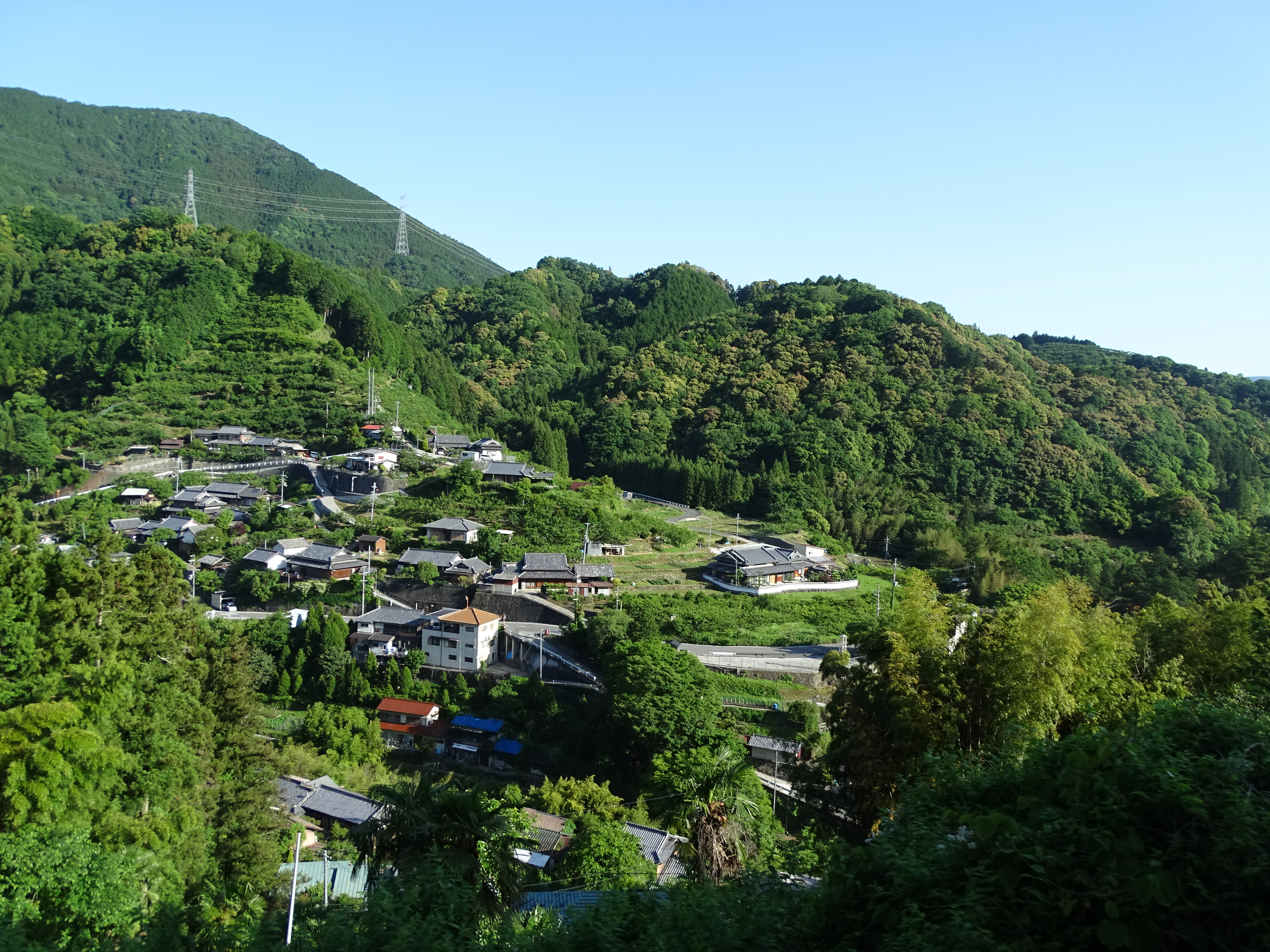
Mount Kōya. It was from here that the Rokkaku clan and its Kōka and Iga allies staged guerrilla war against Oda Nobunaga's armies.

In 1568, Oda Nobunaga, a rising power in central Japan, marched to Kyoto on behalf of Ashikaga Yoshiaki to install Yoshiaki as shogun. The Rokkaku clan in southern Ōmi Province allied with the Miyoshi clan and backed Yoshiaki's nephew and rival, Ashikaga Yoshihide, that the Miyoshi had established in Kyoto. After Rokkaku Yoshitaka and his sons were defeated by Nobunaga during the invasion of Kannonji Castle, they fled first to Kōka and then Mount Kōya. From there they staged a guerrilla war against Nobunaga, assisted by the Iga and Kōka ninja forces. The danger of harassment by this alliance made Nobunaga's control of southern Ōmi insecure, and in 1570 when Nobunaga retreated from the Siege of Kanegasaki back to Kyoto he was forced to go along the north-west shore of Lake Biwa rather than the more direct route through southern Ōmi.

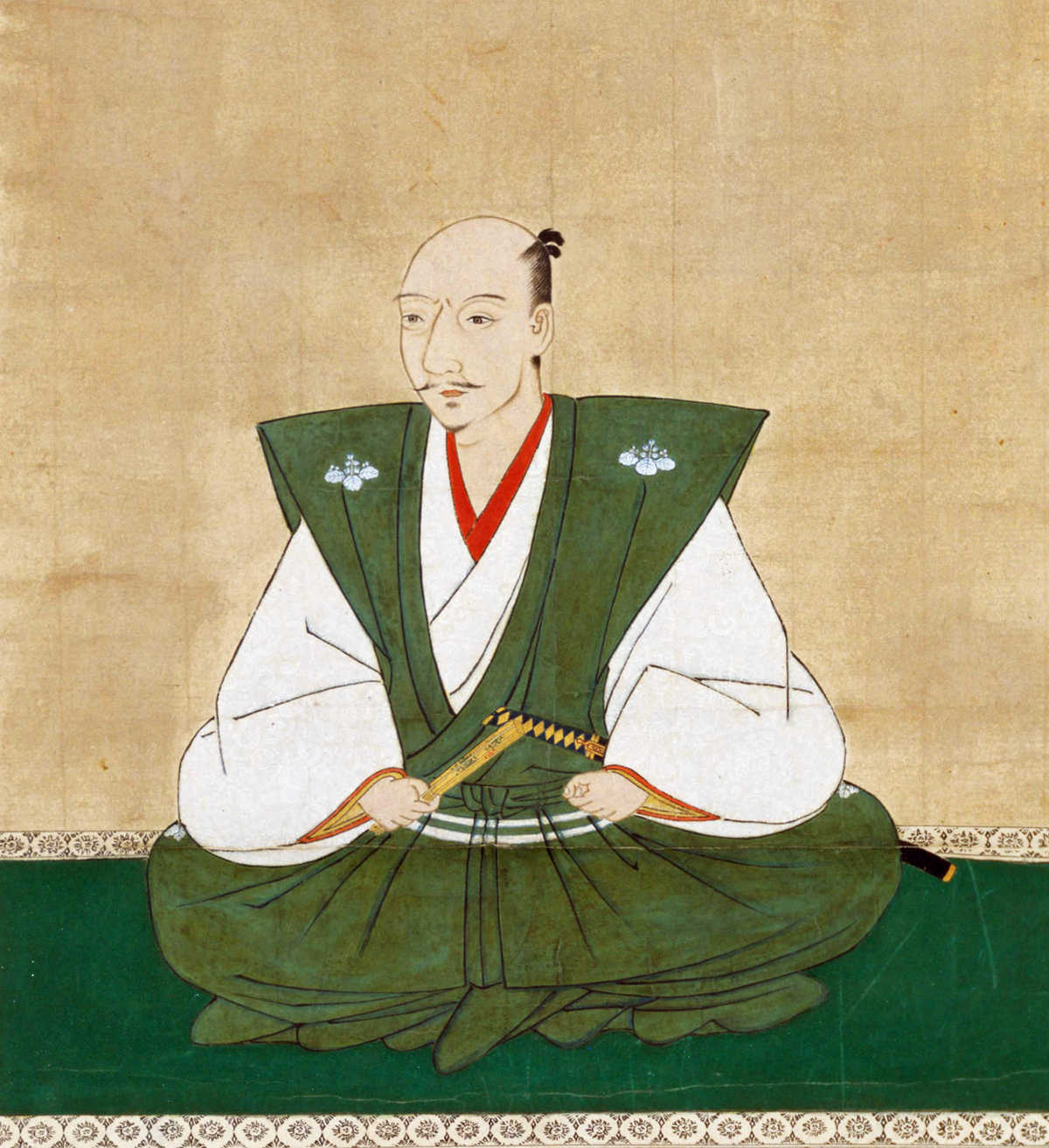
Oda Nobunaga

Jizamurai from Iga and Kōka assisted Yoshitaka and his sons in raids against Nobunaga, including setting fire to the village of Heso and the southern approaches of Moriyama. On July 6, 1570, these alliance forces were moving down along the Yasugawa river when an army led by Shibata Katsuie and Sakuma Morimasa, generals for Nobunaga, intercepted them at the village of Ochikubo. The alliance was defeated and 780 ninja - specified as samurai - from the Iga and Kōka ikkis were killed, along with the father and son Mikumo Takanose and Mikumo Mizuhara. The historian Stephen Turnbull estimates that 780 casualties must have been enormous for Iga and Kōka, since their armies likely were not very large, and indeed Shinchō Kōki, a chronicle of Oda Nobunaga dated to the early Edo period that was compiled by a warrior from Nobunaga's army, makes no reference to that alliance for the next three years.

Around the same time, a monk named Sugitani Zenjūbō who is presumed to have been a mercenary ninja from either Iga or Kōka, failed to assassinate Nobunaga. Turnbull states that Zenjūbō fired two shots at Nobunaga, both of which were absorbed by Nobunaga's armor. Conversely, John Man cites an interview with a local resident in Kōka City who contends that the monk, who the resident insisted was from Kōka, attempted only one shot, which missed narrowly missed Nobunaga and passed through his right sleeve. Zenjūbō was executed three years later.

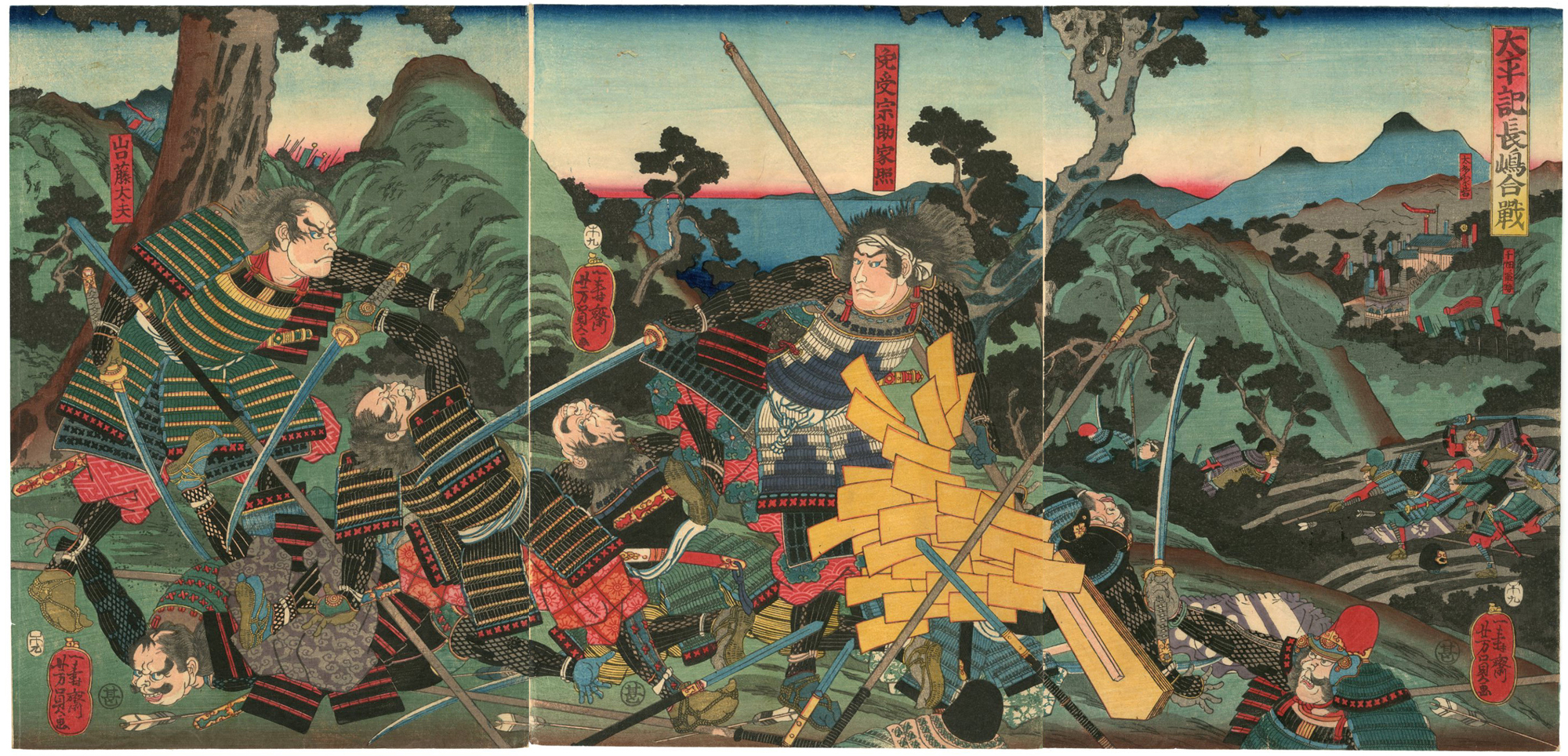
Battle of Nagashima. There were three sieges of Nagashima, and the Iga–Kōka alliance participated in the second.

In 1573, the shogun Yoshiaki attempted to thwart the power Nobunaga held over him and allied with the Rokkaku clan and the Kōka and Iga ikkis. Yoshiaki began constructing a castle next to Lake Biwa. The castle was half-finished and the garrison, which included Kōka and Iga troops, was small when Nobunaga attacked. The defenders fled and begged for mercy, and Nobunaga immediately demolished the castle. The same year, archers from Iga and Kōka assisted the Ikkō-ikki, a rebel confederation of adherents to Jōdo Shinshū with territory located in multiple areas of Honshu, in counter-attacking Nobunaga as he retreated from the second siege of Nagashima. Yoshiaki continued his resistance to Nobunaga but in late summer, 1573, he was defeated and forced to surrender.

=== Dissolution ===
The Iga–Kōka alliance was terminated when Oda Nobunaga forced Kōka to surrender in 1574 after the alliance sided with Rokkaku and Ashikaga Yoshiaki against Oda. According to a document preserved by the Yamanaka family, on March 27, 1574, the remnants of the Kōka jizamurai surrendered to Nobunaga. When Nobunaga destroyed Iga in 1581, troops from Kōka are mentioned among Nobunaga's forces, indicating that it was now compelled to oppose its former ally.
