= Iga ninja =

Iga ninja may refer to:

- A practitioner of the Iga-ryū style of ninjutsu.
- A ninja from or associated with the Iga ikki, a historical confederation of ninja families in Iga Province
