= Kōga ninja =

Kōga or Kōka ninja may refer to:

- A practitioner of the Kōga-ryū style of ninjutsu
- A ninja from or associated with the Kōka ikki, a historical confederation of ninja families in Kōka District.
