= Jizamurai =

Military rulers of small rural domains in medieval Japan

The jizamurai (地侍; Japanese pronunciation: [dʑi.(d)zaꜜ.mɯ.ɾai], lit. 'samurai of the land') were lower-ranking provincial samurai that emerged in 15th-century Japan Muromachi period. The definition was rather broad and the term jizamurai included landholding military aristocracy as well as independent peasant farmers. They alternated between warfare and using their relatively small plots of land for intensive and diversified forms of agriculture. They came from the powerful myōshu (名主), who owned farmland and held leadership positions in their villages, and became vassals of shugo (守護) and later sengoku daimyō (戦国大名).

One of the primary causes for the rise in the number of smaller landholders was a decline in the custom of primogeniture. Towards the end of the Kamakura period, inheritance began to be split among a ruler's sons, making each heir's holdings, and thus their power, smaller. Though many jizamurai were members of the military aristocracy, they were considered to be lower in status compared to the samurai who ruled in castles and cities.

Over time, many of these smaller fiefs came to be dominated by the shugo, constables who were administrators appointed by the shogunate to oversee the provinces. Resentful and mistrustful of the interference of government officials, people under their control banded together into leagues called ikki (一揆). The uprisings that resulted, particularly when the shugo tried to seize control of entire provinces, were also called ikki; some of the largest and most famous took place in Wakasa Province in the 1350s, Yamashiro Province in 1485, and Kaga Province in 1487–1488. In the latter two, independent confederacies, the Yamashiro and Kaga ikki, respectively, were established. In the late 15th century, jizamurai also formed ikki in Iga and Kōka, the military forces of which became known as ninja and gave name to the ninjutsu styles of Iga-ryū and Kōga-ryū.

These independent jizamurai confederacies were eventually subdued by the Oda clan, who launched large invasions into their territory. The surviving jizamurai were given the option to join loyal samurai retinues in the cities and castles, or forsake their samurai status and become peasant farmers. Despite their defeat, the ninjitsu tradition was secretly preserved by the jizamurai and their descendants, allowing it to survive up to present-day.

== In popular culture ==
Jizamurai appear in Hayao Miyazaki's animated film Princess Mononoke as the main force, under the control of Lord Asano, opposing the main character Ashitaka and the people of Iron Town. Miyazaki explains that iron production using iron sand pollutes the downstream areas of rivers, and that if Iron Town were built in the mountains at a time when the distinction between samurai and farmers was blurred, it would be natural for the farmers of the downstream areas and Iron Town to come into conflict with each other, and for the jizamurai to invade Iron Town.

== See also ==
- Ikkō-ikki
- Petty nobility
- Gentry
- Yeoman
- Shugodai
