= Kōka ikki =

Military confederacy of ninja families

Kōka ikki Kōka-gun Chūsō (甲賀郡中惣) (Japanese)
- c. 1460–1574
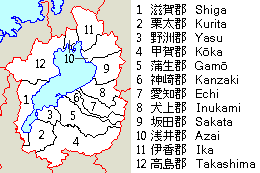
- Ōmi Province with Kōka District labeled with the number 4
- Location: Kōka District; 34°58′N 136°10′E
- Largest city: Kōka
- Religion: Shugendō
- Government: Feudal military confederation • military-elder council
- Legislature: General Assembly of Kōka District (Kōka-gun Chūsō)
- Establishment: c. 1460
- History
  - Established: c. 1460
  - Kōka and Iga units aid Rokkaku Takayori in defending against Ashikaga Yoshihisa: 1487
  - Subjugated by Oda Nobunaga: March 27 1574
  - Participates in the second invasion of Iga ikki: 1581
- Today part of: Japan

The Kōka ikki or Kōka Confederacy, historically known as the Kōka-gun Chūsō, was a military confederation and network of ninja (then known as shinobi) in Kōka District (often spelled Kōga) in Southern Ōmi Province during the Sengoku period of Japan. Kōga-ryū, one of the two major traditions of ninjutsu that survived by fleeing to the mountains, is named after the confederacy and attributes its origins to it. The confederation emerged in the 15th century when local "jizamurai" (lower status samurai landholders) formed mutual defense and aid co-operatives. Local co-operatives together formed larger co-operatives, and all together at the district level. The armies of Kōka achieved fame in 1487 in the Battle of Magari, when they assisted the Rokkaku clan (who controlled the portions of Southern Ōmi province immediately to the north) in defeating a punitive expedition by Ashikaga Yoshihisa. In gratitude for their assistance, the Rokkaku granted 21 prominent families from Kōka positions as retainers.

Although they were previously rivals of Iga Province to the south, by the 16th century Kōka formed an alliance with Iga. As Iga also partook in the Battle of Magari, this alliance was established by 1487 at the latest. Kōka also continued its alliance with the Rokkaku. The independence of the confederation ended with the subjugation of Kōka in 1574 to the Oda clan. After that conquest, Kōka ninjas served Tokugawa Ieyasu and then his descendants late into the Edo period.

== History ==
=== Formation ===
In 15th and 16th-century Japan, Kōka, in Ōmi Province, had some 53 clans and adjacent Iga Province contained some 300–500 small estates. Both regions were in anarchy, with their estates and families constantly engaged in low-level, small-scale feuds and squabbles within and between each region. This and the constant external threats posed by the incessant warfare of the period necessitated that the local jizamurai (wealthy administrators technically of peasant class) and their soldiers develop specialized espionage and combat skills. The remoteness of the hill country in this part of Japan might also have encouraged the development of these skills. The militant mountain-monks, yama-bushi, were also likely an influence as even the bandits in the area wore yellow scarfs that seem to have been copies of those worn by the mountain monks.

Reputedly, the units from these two regions often offered their services to nearby provinces as professionally trained, highly trained mercenaries. The usages of the term shinobi, specifically shinobi-mono, later known as ninjas, appearing in the late 1580s and early 1600s, referred to the soldiers from Iga and Kōka.

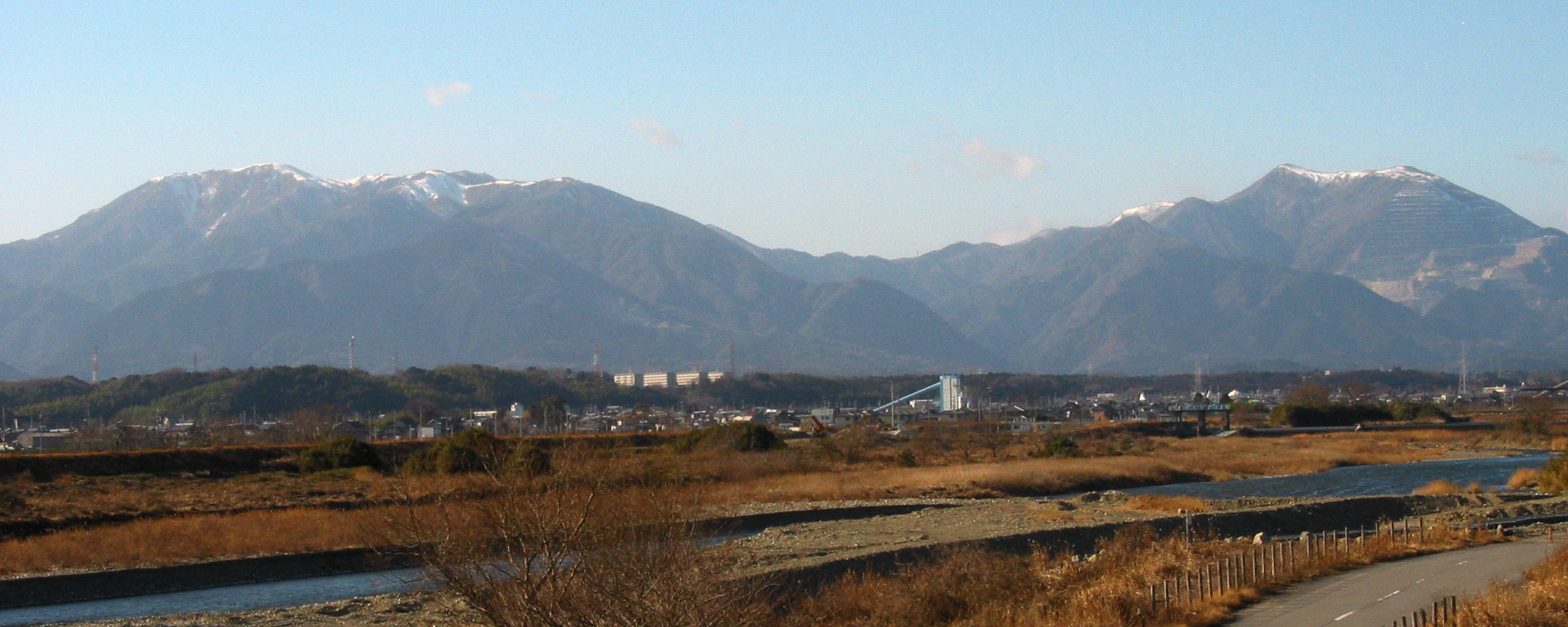
The Suzuka Mountains, which run through the eastern portions of Kōka District.

The anarchy of the period and, in the case of Iga, the remoteness of the territory encouraged autonomy, and the communities began organizing into ikki - "revolts" or "leagues". Kōka was situated along a major road that during the Edo period became the famous Tōkaidō. It thus bridged the isolation of Iga to the key communication lines of Ōmi. Historical Kōka consisted of two large and several small valleys with rivers flowing down from the mountains which separated it from Iga. Terrain along the border with Iga consisted of gentle hills. In the center of the historical area are the Shigaraki Mountains and in the east are the Suzuka Mountains, the latter of which rise some 1,000 m (3,280 ft) above sea level. The two major rivers are the Yasugawa and the Somagawa, which, combined with mountains and hill, form a maze of valleys. At least 230 fortifications dotted the region. The historian Stephen Turnbull wrote that Takigawa Castle, associated with the Ōhara family, is a typical arrangement of these forts: The main castle - kyojō - lies across from the Tendai temple Rakuyaji. Adjacent to it is the western castle - saijō - with another subsidiary castle - bunjō - across the valley. Each follows the mountain castle - yamashiro - design.

=== Kōka-gun Chūsō and joint operations with Iga ikki ===
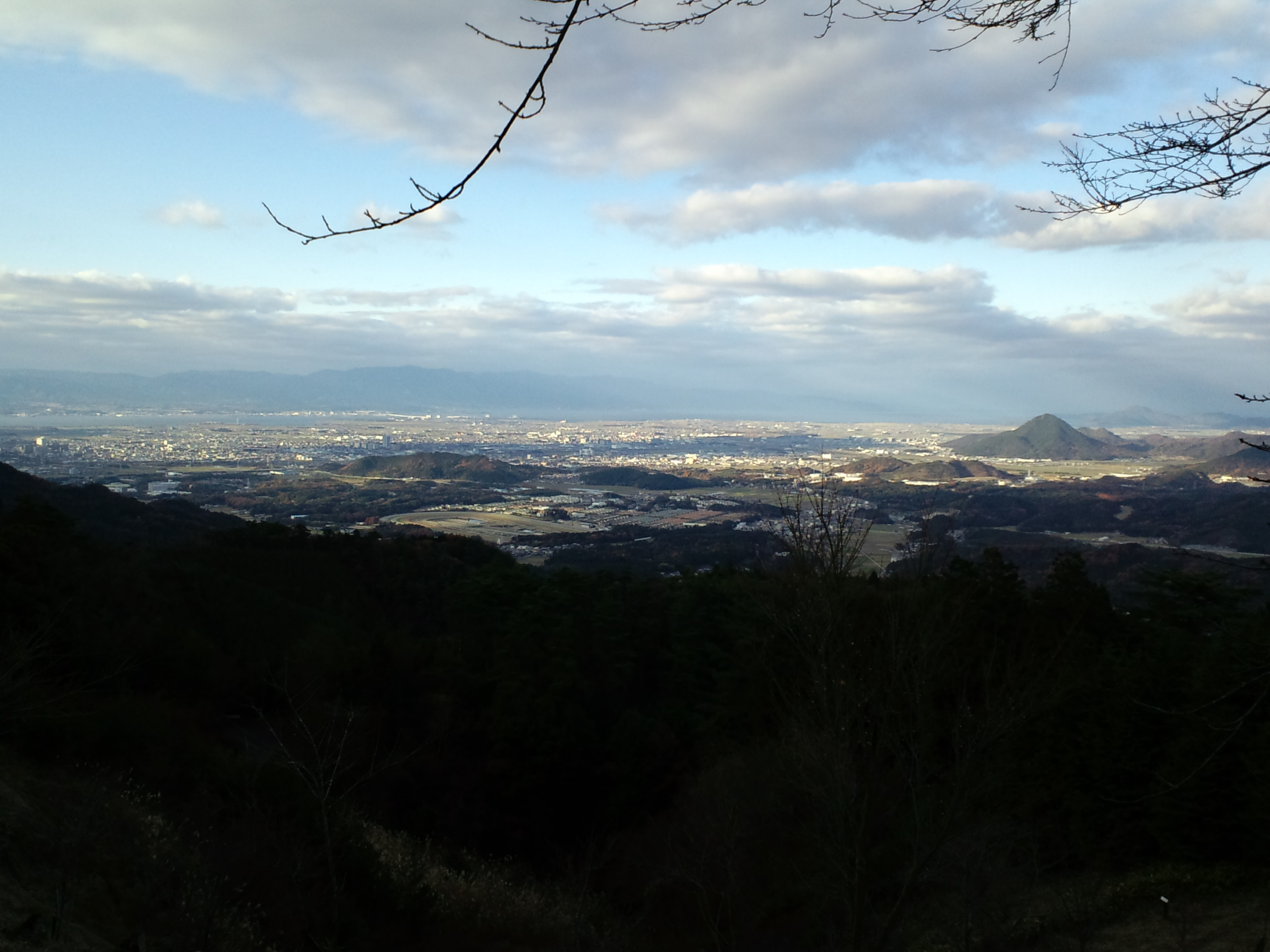
A panorama of Rittō, Shiga. It was in this area that the Battle of Magari was fought.

In 1487, the ninja from Iga and Kōka gained significant fame due to their actions at Magari, a village in what is now Rittō, Shiga. Shogun Ashikaga Yoshihisa, concerned about the aggressive landgrabs by the Kōka shugo, Rokkaku Takayori, attacked Takayori with 30,000 troops. At Magari, Iga and Kōka ninja fought on the side of Takayori, whose forces, including the ninja, barely numbered 6,000 men. Yoshihisa prematurely died of an illness, illness which may have been at least hastened by, if not caused by wounds suffered during, the guerilla tactics and night attacks by the Iga and Kōka units. The 53 ninja families in Kōka who participated in the conflict were recognized as the "Kōka 53", and 21 families were given special recognition from Takayori for their service. The Mochizuki, descendants of the Kōka clan, were among the families which participated in the battle. Because of their service, Takayori made them retainers and allowed them the privileges of surnames and sword ownership.

By the mid-1500s, the services of ninja from Iga and Kōka were in high demand, in use by at least 37 areas. On December 15, 1541, the shogun in Kyoto sent a letter to Iga's governor requesting that the province assist Tsutsui Junshō in his siege of Kasagi Castle. In the morning of December 23, 1541, 70–80 ninja agents from Iga and Kōka infiltrated the castle, set fire to the settlement, and were said to have captured the first and second baileys. Two days later, the armies inside Kasagi sallied out and were defeated, after which the ninjas dispersed.

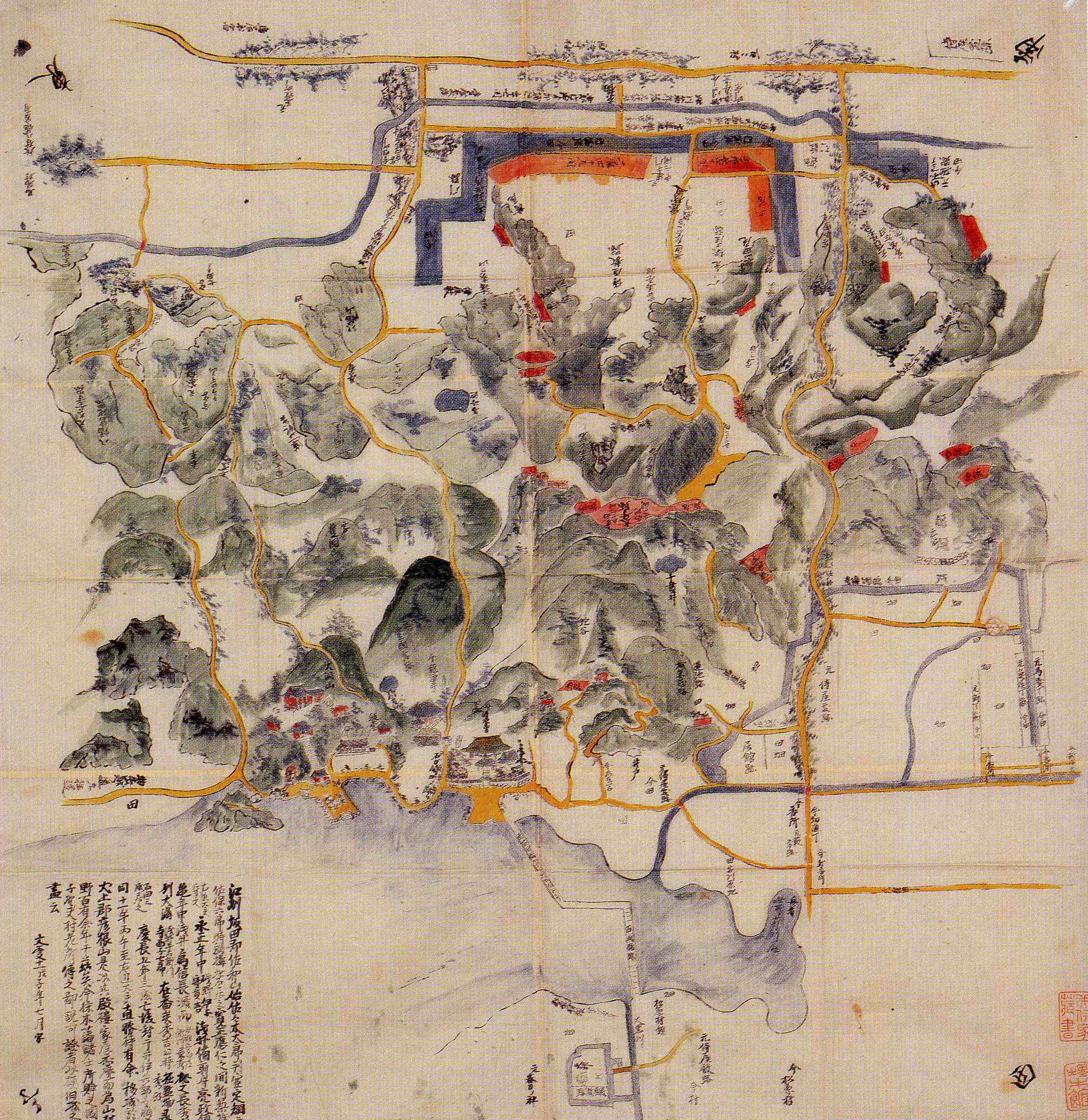
A map of Sawayama Castle, which Kōka ikki allegedly, according to a retrospective account, participated in a siege against.

The Bansenshūkai, an early Edo period document compiled in 1676 by a member of the Fujibayashi family, alleges an incident from 1558 regarding a ninja commander, Tateoka Doshun, from Iga leading a combined force of Iga and Kōka soldiers against Sawayama Castle. However, according to the historian Stephen Turnbull, this account is full of errors, and accounts not derived from the Bansenshūkai do not mention ninja, let alone Tateoka Doshun, at all. Per the account, Rokkaku Yoshikata was campaigning against an alleged rebel retainer, Dodo Oki-no-Kami Kuranosuke, and besieged him. After many days of unsuccessful siege, Yoshikata employed to aid him. Doshun led a team of 44 Iga ninja and 4 Kōka ninja who carried lanterns Doshun had made with replicas of Dodo's mon (family crest). They entered the gates of the castle without opposition and then set fire to the castle. They escaped successfully and in the ensuing panic Yoshikata was able to capture the castle. According to Turnbull, contrary to the account, Dodo in actuality was a retainer of the Rokkaku's enemies, the Azai clan, and when Yoshikata invaded Northern Omi Province in 1559, Dodo was ordered by Azai Nagamasa to hold Sawayama. The historian and travel writer John Man, on the other hand, takes the account at face value and cites this as an example of the fame of the ninjas and of them offering their services for hire.

At some point between 1552 and 1568, the Iga Republic drafted a constitution which included an outline for its alliance with Kōka. Exactly how long the document was extent and how widely it applied is unknown. The document provided for bugyō (military commissioners) to govern the alliance - 12 from Kōka and 10 from Iga - who would regularly meet along the Iga—Kōka border to discuss strategy and other important affairs.

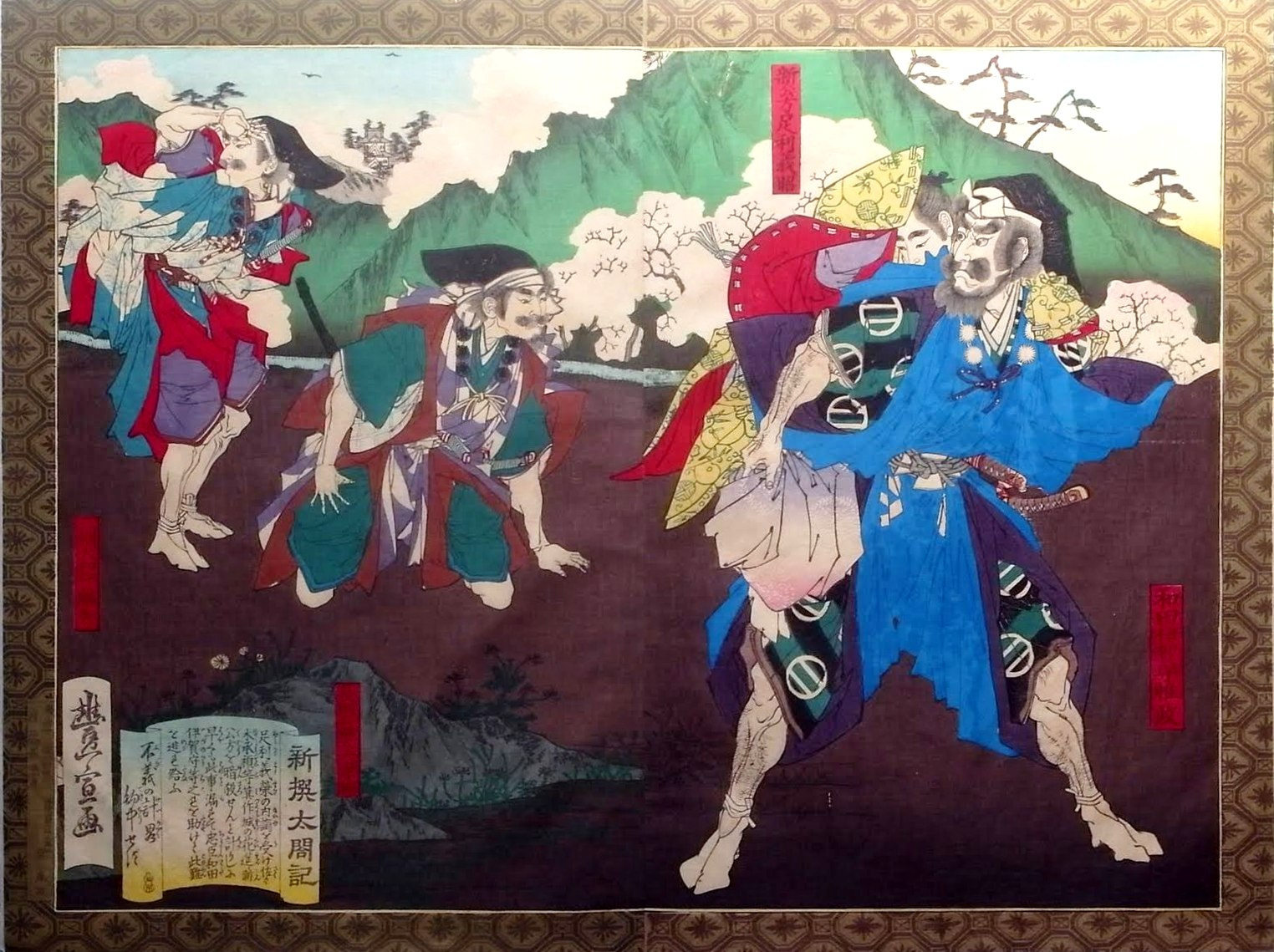
An ukiyo-e of Ashikaga Yoshiaki escaping the Miyoshi and Matsunaga, aided by the powerful ninja leader Wada Koremasa

In 1565, the Wada family in Kōka became embroiled in a conflict for control of the shogunate. That year, Miyoshi Chokei and Matsunaga Hisahide launched an attack on the shogun Ashikaga Yoshiteru while he slept. Yoshiteru was mortally wounded and committed seppuku. His distant cousin, the infant Ashikaga Yoshihide, was denied investiture. Ashikaga Yoshiaki, Yoshiteru's brother who lived as a monk in Nara, was approached by Chokei and Hisahide to be Yoshiteru's successor, but instead Yoshiaki fled south to Kōka. He took refuge under Wada Koremasa, a powerful lord among the Kōka families, and Koremasa either constructed or expanded a mansion for the shogun. The shogun soon left for Yashima in Ōmi plead for help from Rokkaku Yoshikata. Yoshikata, not wanting conflict with the Miyoshi clan, rejected the proposal. Asakura Yoshikage sheltered Yoshiaki but declined to restore him to power. Three years later, Oda Nobunaga pledged to support Yoshiaki, and among the escort sent to Echizen Province was Wada Koremasa. As a reward for his support, Koremasa was granted Akutagawa Castle in Settsu Province. With this, the Wada family's association with Kōka terminated.

==== Conquest ====
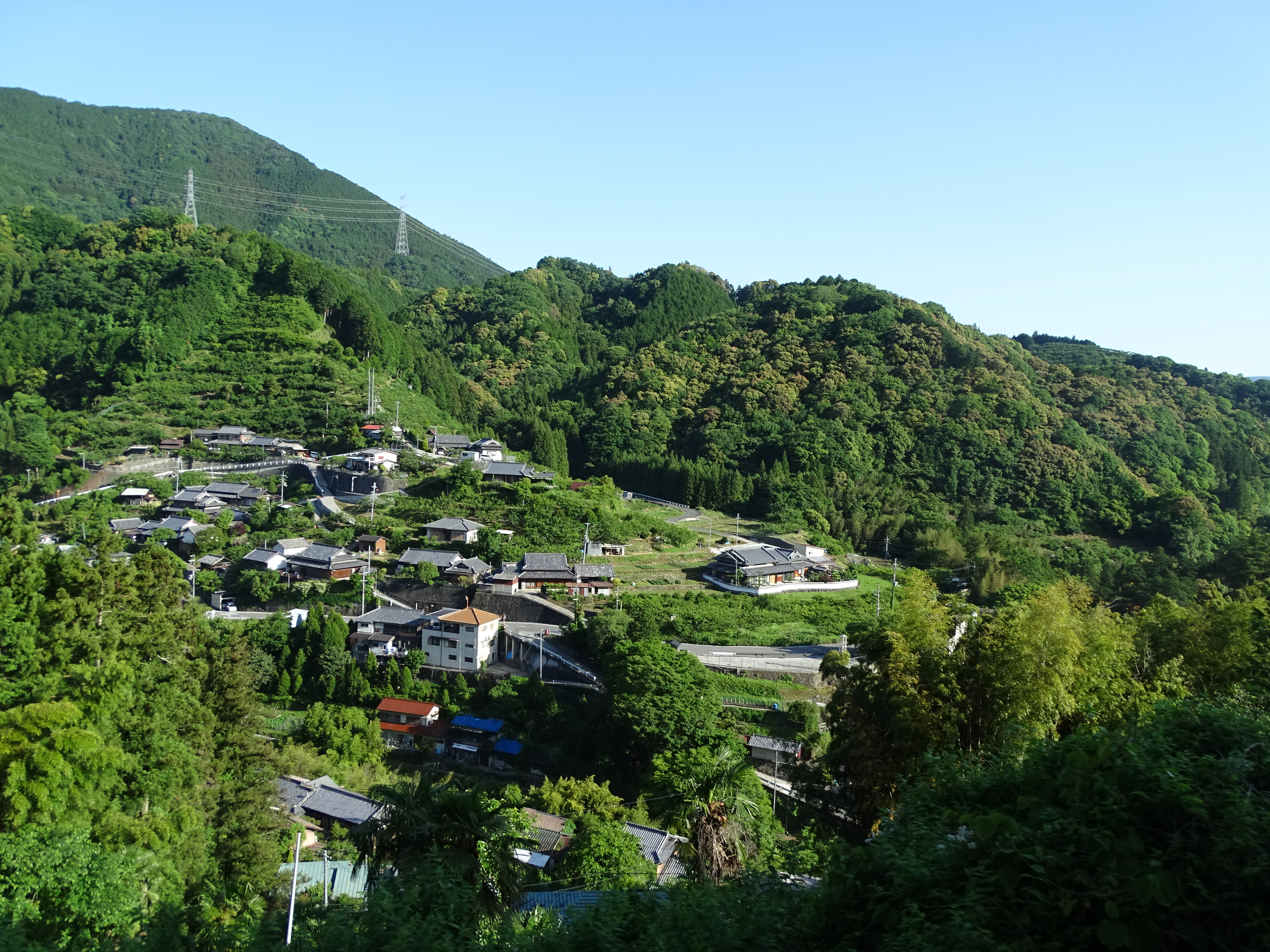
Mount Kōya. It was from here that the Rokkaku clan and its Kōka and Iga allies staged guerrilla war against Oda Nobunaga's armies.

Kōka soon came in conflict with this rising power of Oda Nobunaga. In 1568, Nobunaga marched to Kyoto to install Ashikaga Yoshiaki as shogun. The Rokkaku clan in southern Ōmi Province allied with the Miyoshi clan and backed Yoshiaki's nephew and rival, Ashikaga Yoshihide, that the Miyoshi had installed in Kyoto. After Rokkaku Yoshikata and his sons were defeated during the invasion of Kannonji Castle, they fled first to Kōka and then Mount Kōya. From there they staged a guerrilla war against Nobunaga, assisted by the Iga and Kōka ninja forces. The danger of harassment by this alliance made Nobunaga's control of southern Ōmi insecure, and in 1570 when Nobunaga retreated from the Siege of Kanegasaki back to Kyoto he was forced to go along the north-west shore of Lake Biwa rather than the more direct route through southern Ōmi. Jizamurai from Iga and Kōka assisted Yoshikata and his sons in raids against Nobunaga, including setting fire to the village of Heso and the southern approaches of Moriyama. On July 6, 1570, these alliance forces were moving down along the Yasugawa river when an army led by Shibata Katsuie and Sakuma Morimasa, generals for Nobunaga, intercepted them at the village of Ochikubo. The alliance was defeated and 780 samurai from the Iga and Kōka ikkis were killed, along with the father and son Mikumo Takanose and Mikumo Mizuhara. Stephen Turnbull estimates that 780 casualties must have been enormous for Iga and Kōka, since their armies likely were not very large, and indeed Shinchō Kōki makes no reference to that alliance for the next three years.

Around the same time, a monk named Sugitani Zenjūbō and who is presumed to have been a mercenary ninja from either Iga or Kōka, failed to assassinate Nobunaga. Turnbull states that Zenjūbō fired two shots at Nobunaga, both of which were absorbed by Nobunaga's armor. Conversely, John Man cites an interview with a local resident in Kōka City who contends that the monk was from Kōka and attempted only one shot, which narrowly missed Nobunaga and passed through his right sleeve. He was executed three years later.

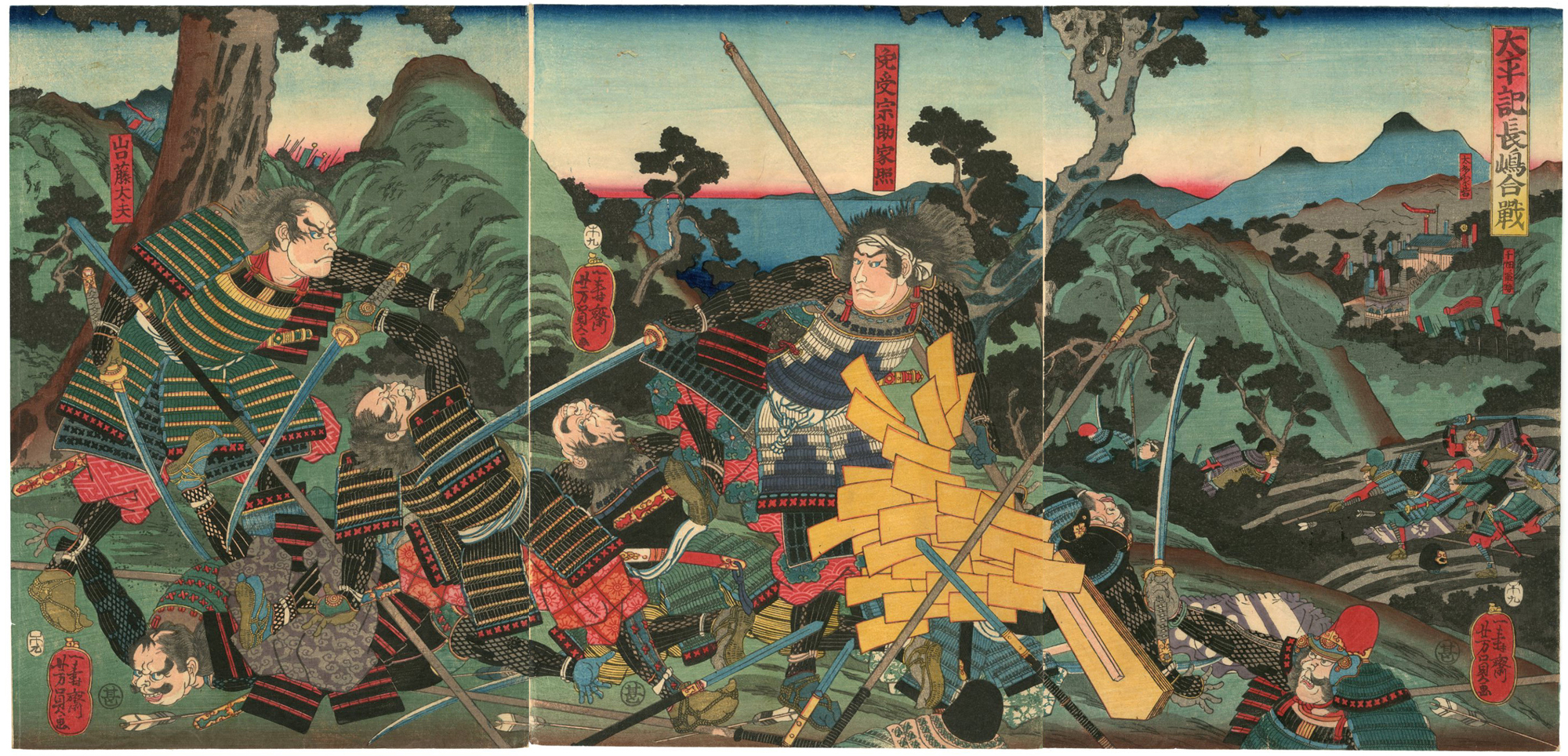
An ukiyo-e of the Sieges of Nagashima. During the second siege, Kōka contributed archers to the defense of the fortress.

In 1573, the shogun Yoshiaka attempted to thwart the power Nobunaga held over him and allied with the Rokkaku and the Kōka and Iga ikkis. Yoshiaki began constructing a castle next to Lake Biwa. The castle was half-finished and the garrison, which included Kōka and Iga troops, was small when Nobunaga attacked. The defenders fled and begged for mercy, and Nobunaga immediately demolished the castle. Later the same year, archers from Iga and Kōka assisted the Ikkō-ikki against Nobunaga as he retreated from the second siege of Nagashima. Yoshiaki continued his resistance to Nobunaga but in late summer, 1573, he was defeated and forced to surrender. The following year, Nobunaga defeated Rokkaku and the Kōka ikki. According to a document preserved by the Yamanaka family, on March 27, 1574, the remnants of the Kōka jizamurai surrendered to Nobunaga. On May 3, Rokkaku Yoshikata, who had fled to Kōka, surrendered to Nobunaga.

=== Existence as an Oda vassal ===
After forcing Kōka into submitting to be a vassal, Nobunaga destroyed the many small castles throughout the district and integrated the Kōka-shu, the military units that had composed the ikki, into his own armed forces. In the second invasion of Iga in 1581, the Kōka-shu are mentioned among the soldiers comprising Nobunaga's invading armies. Thus, Kōka had now been forced to terminate the alliance that Iga had constitutionally bound itself into and instead oppose its southern neighbor.

=== Service under the Tokugawa clan ===
After the destruction of the Iga Confederacy, surviving Kōka and Iga families assisted Tokugawa Ieyasu. In June 1582, after the Honnoji Incident, Ieyasu underwent an arduous journey to escape the enemies of Nobunaga in Sakai and return to Mikawa. However, this journey was very dangerous due to the existence of Ochimusha-gari - outlaw - groups across the route. (Note: According to Imatani Akira, professor of Tsuru University, and Ishikawa Tadashi, assistant professor University of Central Florida, during Sengoku period particularly dangerous groups called Ochimusha-gari or "fallen warrior hunters" had emerged. These groups were disenfranchised peasant or Rōnin who had been displaced by war. They formed self-defense forces which operated outside the law, and they often resorted to hunt samurai or soldiers who had been defeated in wars.) The Kōka ninja assisted the Tokugawa escort group to eliminate the threats of ochimusha-gari, then escorted them until they reached Iga Province. There they were further protected by Iga ninja, which accompanied them until they safely reached Mikawa. The Ietada nikki journal records that the escorts of Ieyasu killed some 200 outlaws during their journey from Osaka.

In 1582, Toyotomi Hideyoshi abolished the Koga samurai, and Koga came under the control of Hideyoshi's vassal, Nakamura Kazushige . As a result, the Koga samurais disenfranchised and became ronin.

After the establishment of the Tokugawa shogunate their services continued throughout the Edo period. The final instance of combat involving ninja was the Shimabara Rebellion in 1630, after which the ninja mostly served as spies and bodyguards. The last documented use of ninja in the shogunate was in 1853 when, allegedly, ninja were sent to investigate the arrival of the Perry Expedition.

== Government ==
In Kōka, the jizamurai organized as an ikki and the high-ranking families, although technically of peasant class, acted as the barons of the district. Pierre Souyri argues that they formed these collectives not out of a commitment to a particular ideology but out of necessity. Defeated jizamurai who took refuge in the area trained the local inhabitants and together they desperately fought to maintain their social status and autonomy. Some 53 clans in the district ruled as the elders of the confederation, meeting successively at three shrines, one of which was located on the outskirts of Kōka City.

The ruling class was called dōmyōchu or ichizoku shūdan, and they composed the Kōka-gun Chūsō (General Assembly of Kōka District), the governing assembly and historical expression for the Kōka Confederacy. Among the documented ruling families are the Ōhara, Hattori, Mochizuki, Ikeda, Ukai, Ichiyaku, Taki, Saji, Takamine, Ueno, Oki, Yamanaka, Ban, and Minobe. Each of these families ruled over a sō, that is, federated districts of villages pledged to provide mutual aid and self-defense, roughly analogous to a European medieval commune. These districts then sometimes were themselves part of higher level sō. For example, the Yamanaka, Ban, and Minobe families, who all lived in the vicinity of Kashigawi Shrine, each controlled a respective sō, named a dōmyō-sō because all the members of the respective district shared the same surname. They then combined their individual sō into the Kashigawi sanbōsō (the Kashigawi three-member league). All these family sō linked together to form a district-wide sō that was the Kōka Confederacy. The historian Pierre Souyri speculates that this high level of social organization allowed the jizamurai, who were of lower rank in society, to become particularly powerful in Kōka. The lesser landholders composed the samurai-shū, among whom are the documented clans Tomita, Masuda, Shiotsu, Nishioka, Kitano, and Nakagami. Below the district level, individual villages formed communes named sōson, which came to replace estates as the dominant source of power.

The Wada family also were powerful, controlling a series of mountain castles along a river valley. The most famous member of the clan, Wada Koremasa, controlled his small valley as if he were a daimyō. He built at least seven fortifications: Wada Castle, five adjacent bunjō, each one of which was in sight of at least two others, and kubō yashiki, which was the mansion for Ashikaga Yoshiaki when he took refuge in Kōka after the assassination of his brother Ashikaga Yoshiteru in 1565. After allying with Oda Nobunaga to restore Yoshiaki in 1568, Koremasa was granted land in Settsu Province the same year, and with that relocation ended the Wada association with Kōka.

The Russian economist Vladimir V. Maltsev hypothesizes that the formation of a private and voluntary government allowed Iga and Kōka the stability to reap profits from its mercenary market while remaining effectively stateless. In most of Japan after the Onin War, the loss of centralized power and the ensuing banditry, peasant uprisings, and feuds between and predatory taxation and raids by local daimyō resulted in insecure property rights, thin markets, and greatly weakened provision of public goods. This economic situation offered a lucrative mercenary market. Conventionally in economics, a formal state is deemed necessary to protect complex trade arrangements. However, Maltsev hypothesizes that in the chaotic and violent environment of the Sengoku period, state formation was cost-prohibitive and potentially hazardous for the region. Instead, the model of private government practiced by various ikki was much more attractive, whose voluntary nature of the confederacy resulted in a competitive Tiebout model of government.

== Religion ==
The religion in the district was Shugendō, a syncretism of Buddhism and Shinto, particularly Tendai and Shingon. In the hill country, militant mountain-monks dedicated themselves to asceticism and esoteric practice. Members of the samurai-shū are mentioned in a 1475 document of donations to Aburahi Daimyōjin, the patron deity of Kōka, and the Kōka-gun are named in a 1571 records relating to the mediation of a dispute between the Handōji, the main Shugendō temple in Kōka, and the Shingu and Yagawa Shrines. Takigawa Castle, of the Ōhara clan, lay across from the Tendai temple Rakuyaji.
