= Wada Koremasa =

Japanese samurai (1536–1571)

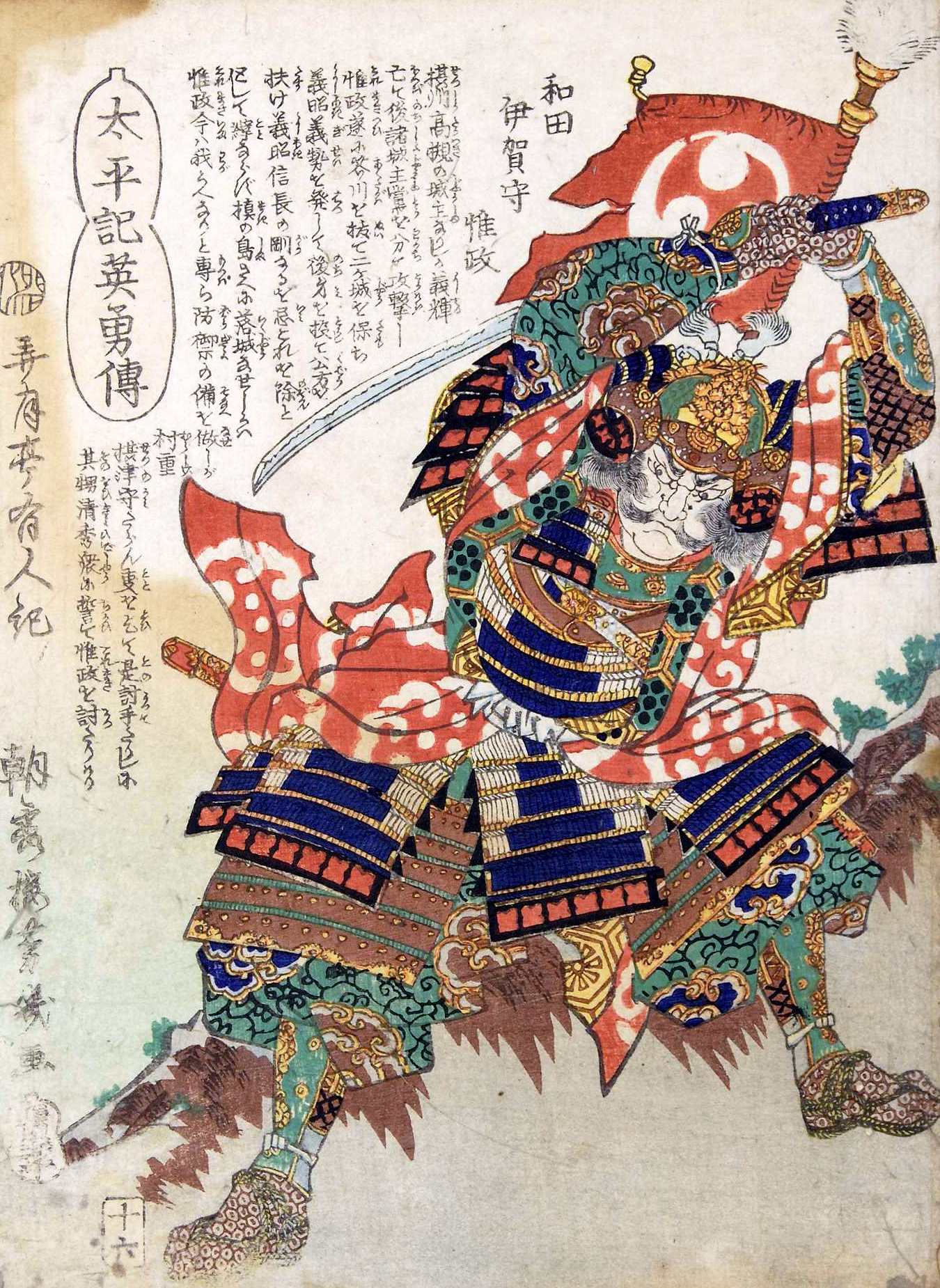
Portrait of Wada Koremasa from Utagawa Yoshiiku's Heroes of the Taiheiki

Wada Koremasa (和田 惟政; 1536–1571) was samurai and senior retainer of the Ashikaga Shogunate. The Wada clan were a Kōka ikki clan in Kōka District until Koremasa was granted land in Settsu Province in 1568 as a reward for his support for Ashikaga Yoshiaki and Oda Nobunaga.

Nobunaga held him in high regard. Koremasa was appointed as the lord of Takatsuki castle and given part of the Settsu province. He secured an audience between Oda Nobunaga and the Jesuit Missionary Luís Fróis, and was a staunch supporter of the Catholic Church throughout his life. Koremasa fought against Settsu Ikeda clan and died during the battle of Shiraigawara in 1571, being killed by Araki Murashige.
