= Tateoka Doshun =

Legendary Iga ninja

Tateoka no Dōshun 楯岡ノ道順
- Military career
- Allegiance: Iga ikki • Kōka ikki • Rokkaku clan
- Service years: Mid-16th century
- Unit: Iga-shū
- Conflicts: Siege of Sawayama

Tateoka Doshun (楯岡ノ道順, Tateoka no Dōshun) was purported to be a ninja from the Iga ikki during the Sengoku period. He is also known as Igasaki Doshun or Igasaki Dōjun (伊賀崎道順).

According to the Bansenshūkai, an early Edo period document compiled in 1676 by a member of the Fujibayashi family, Tateoka led an assault in 1558. The document recounts that in 1558, Rokkaku Yoshikata was campaigning against a rebel retainer, Dodo Kuranosuke, and besieged him in Sawayama Castle. After many days of unsuccessful siege, Yoshikata employed Tateoka Doshun from Iga to aid him. Doshun led a team of 44 Iga ninja and 4 Kōka ninja who carried lanterns Doshun had made with replicas of Dodo's mon (family crest). They entered the gates of the castle without opposition and then set fire to the castle. They escaped successfully and in the ensuing panic Yoshikata was able to capture the castle. The same technique was also used by Matsudaira clan during the siege of Kaminogō Castle in 1562. However, this account of the Rokkaku campaign against Dodo is full of errors, and accounts not derived from the Bansenshūkai do not mention ninja, let alone Tateoka Doshun, at all. Dodo Oki-no-Kami Kuranosuke in actuality was a retainer of the Rokkaku's enemies, the Azai clan, and when Yoshikata invaded Northern Omi Province in 1559, Dodo was ordered by Azai Nagamasa to hold Sawayama. There is a popular rumour that Tokugawa Ieyasu had Doshun assassinated by Hattori Hanzō during the Battle of Komaki and Nagakute for giving information to the Toyotomi clan.
