= Military Council =

A military council is an approach to organization by a council with representatives from various bodies.

The term "military council", also known as council of war, applied to organizational groupings of senior ranking officers in the European armies of the 19th century during operational planning, also refers to the practice retained in the Soviet Union's Red Army until 1947.

As a proper noun term, it may refer to:

- Military Council (Russian Empire), a coordination body which operated under the Ministry of War of the Russian Empire.
- Military Council (Georgia), the military junta that couped the Georgian government in the Georgian Civil War, and ruled from January 6–March 10, 1992
- Military Council for Justice and Democracy, the supreme political body of Mauritania
- Military Council of National Salvation, a military group administering Poland during the period of martial law, 1981–1983
- Revolutionary Military Council, the supreme military authority of Soviet Russia from 1918 to 1934
- Transitional Military Council (1985), a council created to lead Sudan, lasted from April 1985 to April 1986
- Transitional Military Council (2019), a council created to lead Sudan, lasted from April to August 2019
- Transitional Military Council (Chad), a council created to lead Chad after the death of president Idriss Déby, established April 2021
- Shura Council of Benghazi Revolutionaries, an Islamist coalition created in 2014 during the Second Libyan Civil War
- One of the Syrian Democratic Forces military councils, each of which unifies local units loyal to the Syrian Democratic Forces in the context of the Syrian Civil War.
- Military Council for the Liberation of Syria, Assadist insurgent group in Syria
