= Iga ikki =

Military confederation of ninja families

Iga ikki Iga Sokoku Ikki (伊賀惣国一揆) (Japanese)
- c. 1460–1581
- Location of Iga Province

- Map of late 16th-century Iga Province during the Tenshō Iga War
- Headquarters: Ueno; 34°46′N 136°8′E
- Religion: Shugendō (Tendai-Tantric Buddhism and Shinto)
- Government: Feudal military confederated republic
- Legislature: Military-elder council
- History
  - Shinobi begin organizing in Iga: c. 1460
  - The de facto independence of Iga is first mentioned: 1477
  - Battle of Magari: Iga and Kōka assist Rokkaku Takayori in repelling an invasion by Shogun Ashikaga Yoshihisa: 1487
  - Constitutional document drafted: c. 1560
  - First Tenshō Iga War: October 6–7, 1579
  - Second Tenshō Iga War; organized governance destroyed: September 30–October 8, 1581 1581
- Today part of: Japan

The Iga ikki, full name Iga Sokoku Ikki, also known as the Iga Republic, Iga Confederacy, or Iga Commune, was a republic-style military confederation of ninjas (then known as shinobi) based in Iga Province during the Sengoku period of Japan. One of the two major schools of ninjutsu, Iga-ryū, is attributed to and takes its name from this confederation. During the second half of the 15th century, the ninja families in Iga formed a military confederacy dedicated to the defense of the province. After centuries of rivalry with its northern neighbor, Kōka District in Ōmi Province, eventually Iga worked closely with in alliance with Kōka.

In the 16th century, a constitution was drafted based on principles of mutual defense and voluntary association. The confederacy produced legendary figures such as Hattori Hanzō, Tateoka Doshun, and Shimotsuge no Kizaru. The activities of Iga eventually drew the ire of the Oda clan, who launched invasions in 1579 and 1581. The first invasion was decisively repelled by Iga, but the second overwhelmed the Iga forces and Oda Nobunaga viciously destroyed the confederation. Some ninja were spared and their activities allowed to continue. After Nobunaga's assassination in 1582, Iga and Kōka ninja entered the service of Tokugawa Ieyasu and his descendants into the Tokugawa shogunate.

== Primary sources ==
Though there are an abundance of primary documents attesting the history of the Iga ninjas, the majority were written decades later during the Tokugawa shogunate and were subject to distortion and exaggeration. Shinchō Kōki, a chronicle of Oda Nobunaga that was compiled in the early Edo period based on records kept by Ōta Gyūichi, a warrior who followed Nobunaga, is considered by historians to be "mostly factual" and "reliable". It includes mentions of Iga and Kōka soldiers. Most pre-Edo sources are presumed lost in the devastation of Oda Nobunaga's destruction of the Iga ikki in 1581.

Five pre-1581 sources detailing military activities by Iga ninja survive. Four of these are diaries or letters from local temples. A December 1541 raid on Kasagi Castle at the request of the Ashikaga shogunate was detailed by Abbot Eishun of Tamon'In, a sub-temple of Kōfuku-ji, in his diary Tamon'In nikki. Kyōroku Temmon no Ikki, another diary associated with Kōfuku-ji, describes an attack on Takada Castle in 1556. A letter from Ichiborō a priest of Kongōbu-ji to Futami Mitzuzōin, dated September 12, 1580, describes a counter-attack by the Iga ikki against an ally of Oda Nobunaga, Sakaibe Hyōbudaiyū. Amagoisan rōjō okite kaki — Written Regulations for the Siege of Amagoison, a fifth and undated document, describes events from the Tenshō Iga War. While Kawakami Jinichi, a historian at Mie University, dates the document to 1579, because Oda Nobukatsu in that year invaded from Ise Province while the work mentions the invasion of Iga coming from Kōka, historian Stephen Turnbull believes that Amagoisan describes the second invasion by Oda Nobunaga in 1581, specifically the force led by Gamō Hidesato along Tamataki route from Kōka.

There also is an extant constitution with an unclear provenance and no specific date or year. It was preserved in Kōka by the Yamanaka family but was attributed to Iga by the historian Ishida Yoshihito because it refers to a "self-governing league" - sokoku ikki -, which is what Iga referred to itself as. Based on references within the document, Yoshihito deduced that it was composed between 1552 and 1568.

== History ==
=== Formation ===
In 15th and 16th century Japan, Iga Province contained some 300-500 small estates and 700 castles and nearby Kōka, in Ōmi Province, had some 53 clans. Both regions were in anarchy, their estates and families constantly engaged in low-level, small-scale feuds and squabbles within and between each region. In Iga, fighting was constant from at least the late 13th century. Bandits also frequently raided the local monasteries. For example, late into the Kamakura period, bandits attacked the Tōdaiji monastery on the Kuroda estate. Incessant warfare broke out in the region 14th century and neighboring daimyo posed external threats to Iga. These threats and the banditry necessitated that the local jizamurai (high-ranking peasant warriors) form an alliance and develop specialized combat, espionage, and guerilla warfare skills in order to restore peace and order to the province. The remoteness of the hill country in this part of Japan might also have encouraged the development of these skills. Iga was surrounded by mountains and accessible mostly only by narrow paths that permitted only one horse-rider at a time. The militant mountain-monks, yama-bushi, were also likely an influence as even the bandits in the area wore yellow scarfs that seem to have been copies of those worn by the mountain monks. Reputedly, the units from these two regions often offered their services to nearby provinces as professionally trained, highly trained mercenaries. Specifically, the Iga professionals were sought after for their skill at siege warfare, that is, shirotori, which included night attacks and ambush. The legendary general Kusunoki Masashige was said to have employed soldiers from Iga to infiltrate and reconnoiter Kyoto in the early 14th century. Turnbull in 2007 argued that this market in mercenary work could have been a motivator for exaggerating the abilities of ninja. However, in 2017, Turnbull questions the existence of such a market at all, contending that, contrary to the mercenary narrative, political self-interest, including continued survival, could also have equally motivated the activities of Iga units in these provinces. The usages of the term shinobi, specifically shinobi-mono, later known as ninjas, appearing in the late 1580s and early 1600s, referred to the soldiers from Iga and Kōka. The isolation in these two regions encouraged autonomy, and the communities began organizing into ikki - "revolts" or "leagues".

=== Late 15th century ===
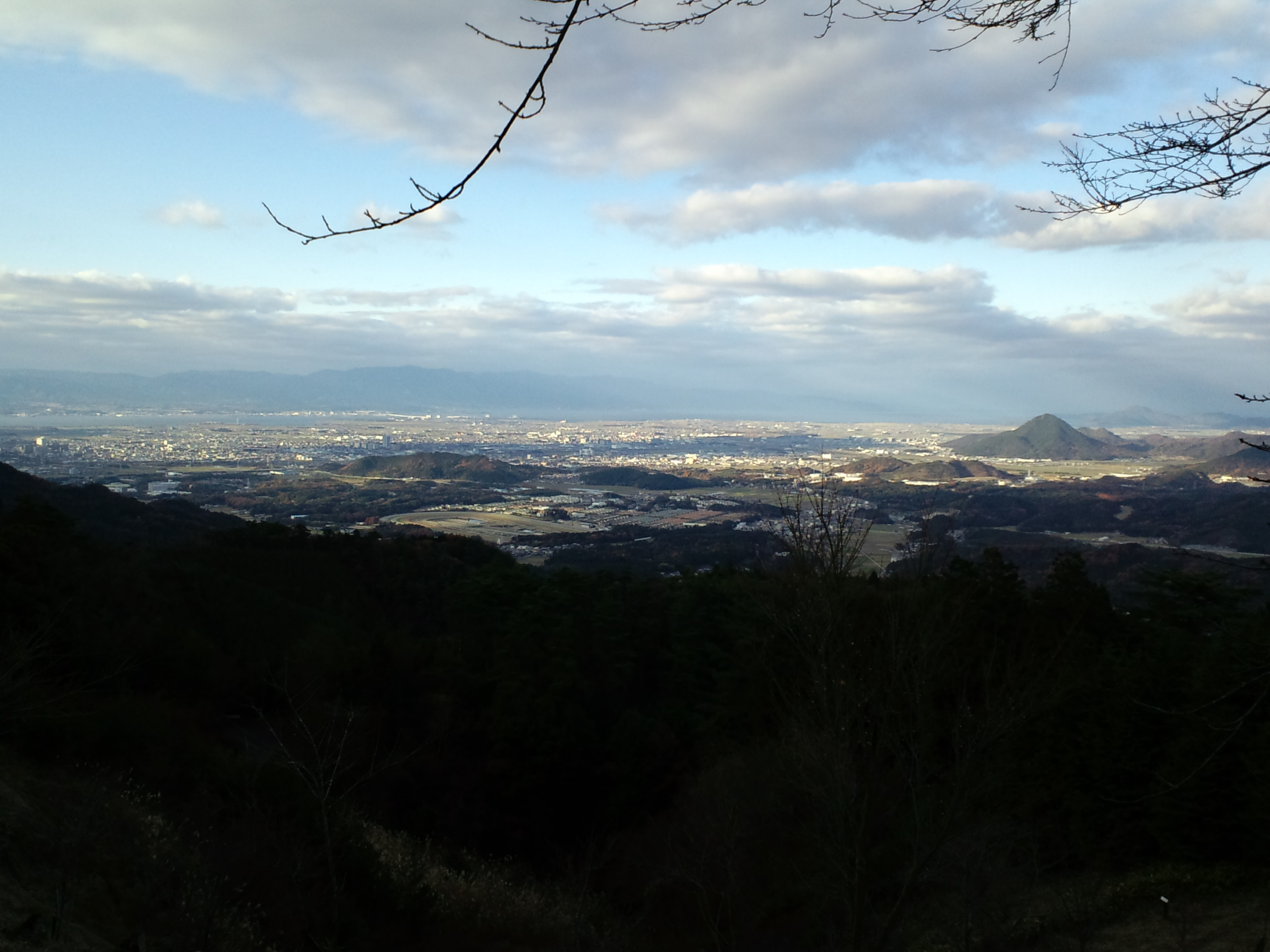
A panorama of Rittō, Shiga. It was in this area that the Battle of Magari was fought.

By 1477 Iga was known for rejecting the authority of the military governors - shugo - appointed by the shogun, and by around 1500 they had formed an ikki - a "league". Instead of a local daimyo from an aristocratic family replacing the shugo, leadership remained divided among the jizamurai and they formed a league. Records of their military unit, Iga-shū, appear as early as June 1470, when they assisted the Hatakeyama clan in an attack in the fields outside the Negoro-ji in Wakayama. Another reference to the Iga-shū appears in 1482. In October 1485, Iga kokujin – another term for jizamurai – helped the Hatakeyama defend Mizushi-castle in the neighboring Yamato Province. In 1487, the ninja from Iga and Kōka gained significant fame due to their actions at Magari, which is part of present-day Rittō, Shiga. Shogun Ashikaga Yoshihisa, concerned about the aggressive landgrabs by the Kōka shugo, Rokkaku Takayori, attacked Takayori. At Magari, Iga and Kōka ninja fought on the side of Takayori in exchange for Takayori recognizing their land ownership. The illness which prematurely killed Yoshihisa may have been at least hastened by, if not caused by wounds suffered during, the guerilla tactics and night attacks by the Iga and Kōka units. Iga troops again were involved with the Rokkaku in 1492.

=== Mid-16th century ===
By the mid-1500s, the services of ninja from Iga and Kōka were in high demand, in use by at least 37 areas. On December 15, 1541, the shogun in Kyoto sent a letter to Iga's governor requesting that the province assist Tsutsui Junshō in his siege of Kasagi Castle. In the morning of December 23, 1541, 70–80 ninja agents from Iga and Kōka infiltrated the castle, set fire to the settlement, and were said to have captured the first and second baileys. Two days later, the armies inside Kasagi sallied out and were defeated, after which the ninjas dispersed. On January 24, 1556, during the Tsutsui siege of Takada Castle in Yamato Province (the site of present-day Takada High School in Yamatotakada, Nara), 11 Iga soldiers attacked the castle and both the castle and the nearby Jōkō-ji were set ablaze.

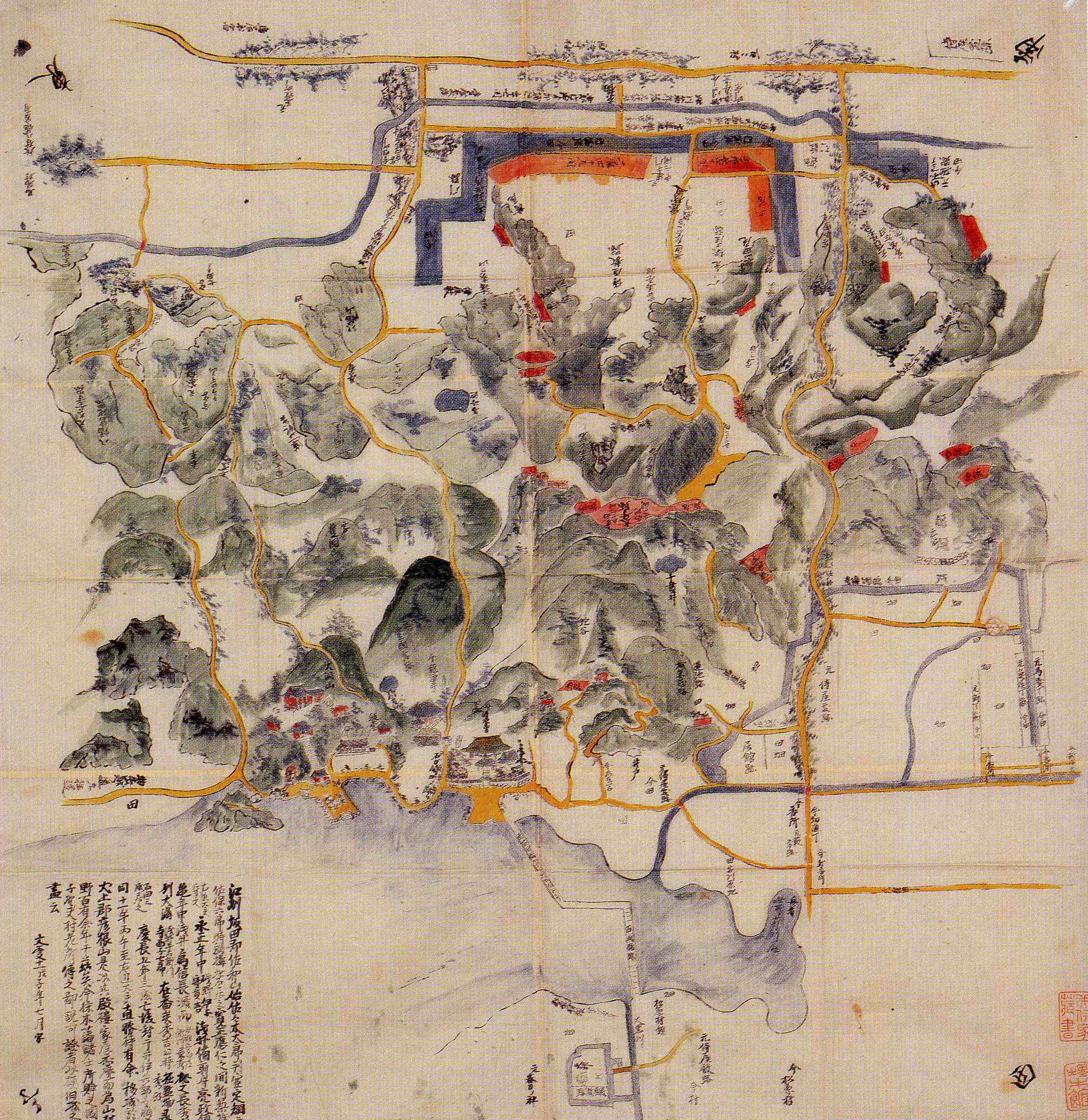
A map of Sawayama Castle, which Iga ikki allegedly, according to a retrospective account, participated in a siege against.

The Bansenshūkai, an early Edo period document compiled in 1676 by a member of the Fujibayashi family, alleges an incident from 1558 regarding a ninja commander, Tateoka Doshun, from Iga leading a combined force of Iga and Kōka soldiers against Sawayama Castle. However, according to the historian Stephen Turnbull, this account is full of errors, and accounts not derived from the Bansenshūkai do not mention ninja, let alone Tateoka Doshun, at all. Per the account, Rokkaku Yoshikata was campaigning against an alleged rebel retainer, Dodo Oki-no-Kami Kuranosuke, and besieged him. After many days of unsuccessful siege, Yoshikata employed Doshun to aid him. Doshun led a team of 44 Iga ninja and 4 Kōka ninja who carried lanterns Doshun had made with replicas of Dodo's mon (family crest). They entered the gates of the castle without opposition and then set fire to the castle. They escaped successfully and in the ensuing panic Yoshikata was able to capture the castle. According to Turnbull, contrary to the account, Dodo in actuality was a retainer of the Rokkaku's enemies, the Azai clan, and when Yoshikata invaded Northern Omi Province in 1559, Dodo was ordered by Azai Nagamasa to hold Sawayama. The historian and travel writer John Man, on the other hand, takes the account at face value and cites this as an example of the fame of the ninjas and of them offering their services for hire.

Around 1560, the confederacy drafted a constitution which included an outline for an alliance with Kōka. Exactly how long the document was extent for, and how widely it applied to the villages of the region, is unknown. In 1560, a highly influential leader within the confederacy, Shimotsuge no Kizaru, attacked Tōichi Castle (present-day Kashihara, Nara), which was commanded by Hashio Shōjirō Tōkatsu. The general's residence was captured, forcing him to flee to Toyoda Castle with his retainer, Dōruku. A man named Ueda and four others were killed.

=== Conflict with Oda Nobunaga ===
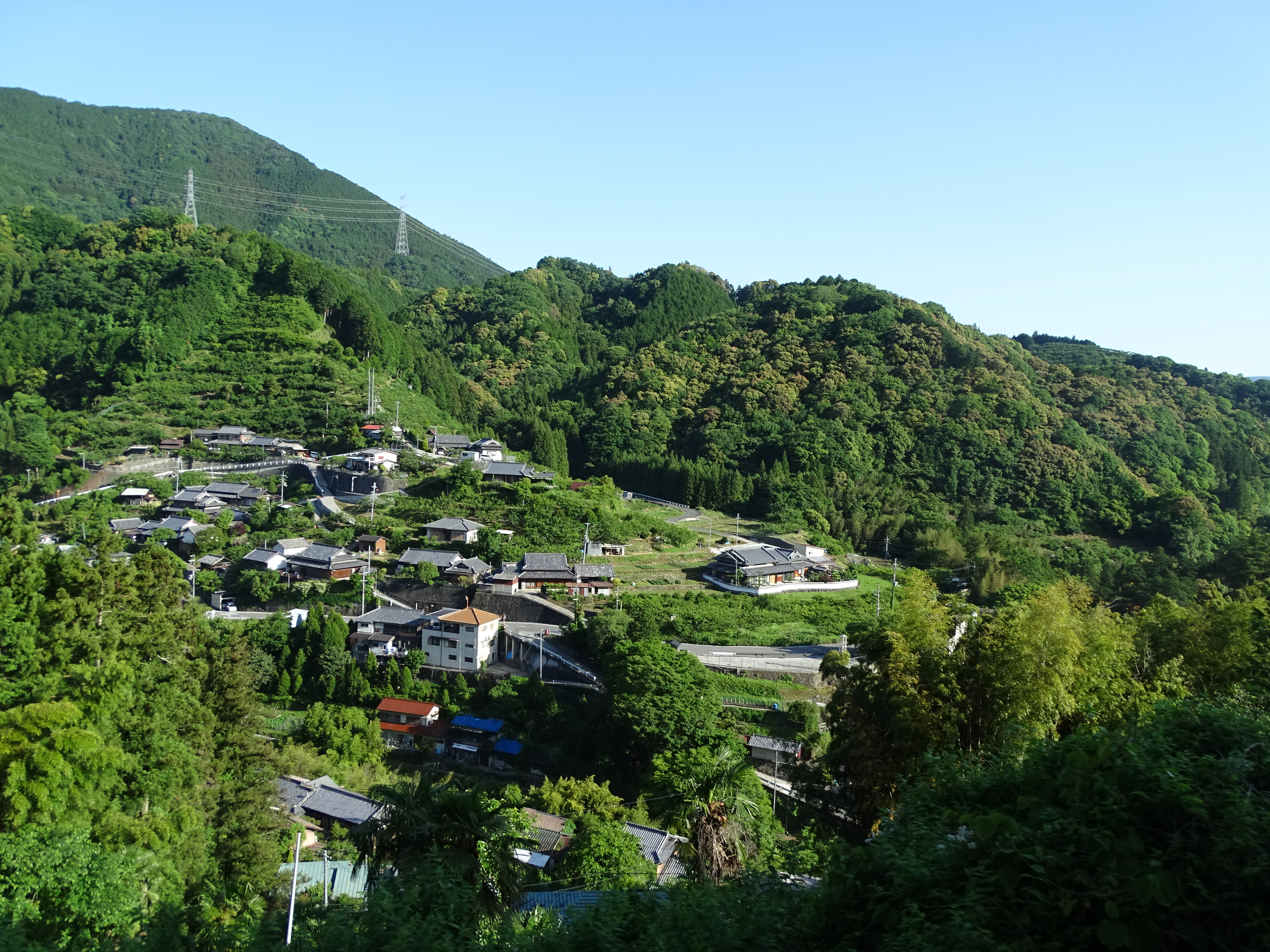
Mount Kōya. It was from here that the Rokkaku clan and its Kōka and Iga allies staged guerrilla war against Oda Nobunaga's armies.

The republic soon came in conflict with the rising power of Oda Nobunaga. In 1568, Nobunaga marched to Kyoto to install Ashikaga Yoshiaki as shogun. The Rokkaku clan in southern Ōmi Province allied with the Miyoshi clan and backed Yoshiaki's nephew and rival, Ashikaga Yoshihide, that the Miyoshi had installed in Kyoto. After Rokkaku Jōtei and his sons were defeated during the invasion of Kannonji Castle, they fled first to Kōka and then Mount Kōya. From there they staged a guerrilla war against Nobunaga, assisted by the Iga and Kōka ninja forces. The danger of harassment by this alliance made Nobunaga's control of southern Ōmi insecure, and in 1570 when Nobunaga retreated from the Siege of Kanegasaki back to Kyoto he was forced to go along the north-west shore of Lake Biwa rather than the more direct route through southern Ōmi. Jizamurai from Iga and Kōka assisted Jōtei and his sons in raids against Nobunaga, including setting fire to the village of Heso and the southern approaches of Moriyama. On July 6, 1570, these alliance forces were moving down along the Yasugawa river when an army led by Shibata Katsuie and Sakuma Morimasa, generals for Nobunaga, intercepted them at the village of Ochikubo. The alliance was defeated and 780 samurai from the Iga and Kōka ikkis were killed, along with the father and son Mikumo Takanose and Mikumo Mizuhara. Stephen Turnbull estimates that 780 casualties must have been enormous for Iga and Kōka, since their armies likely were not very large, and indeed Shinchō Kōki makes no reference to that alliance for the next three years.

Around the same time, a monk named Sugitani Zenjūbō and who is presumed to have been a mercenary ninja assassin from either Iga or Kōka, ambushed Nobunaga, fired at him, but failed to successfully assassinate him. Turnbull states that Zenjūbō fired two shots at Nobunaga, both of which were absorbed by Nobunaga's armor. Conversely, John Man cites an interview with a local resident in Kōka City who contends that the monk was from Kōka and attempted only one shot, which narrowly missed Nobunaga and passed through his right sleeve. He was executed three years later.

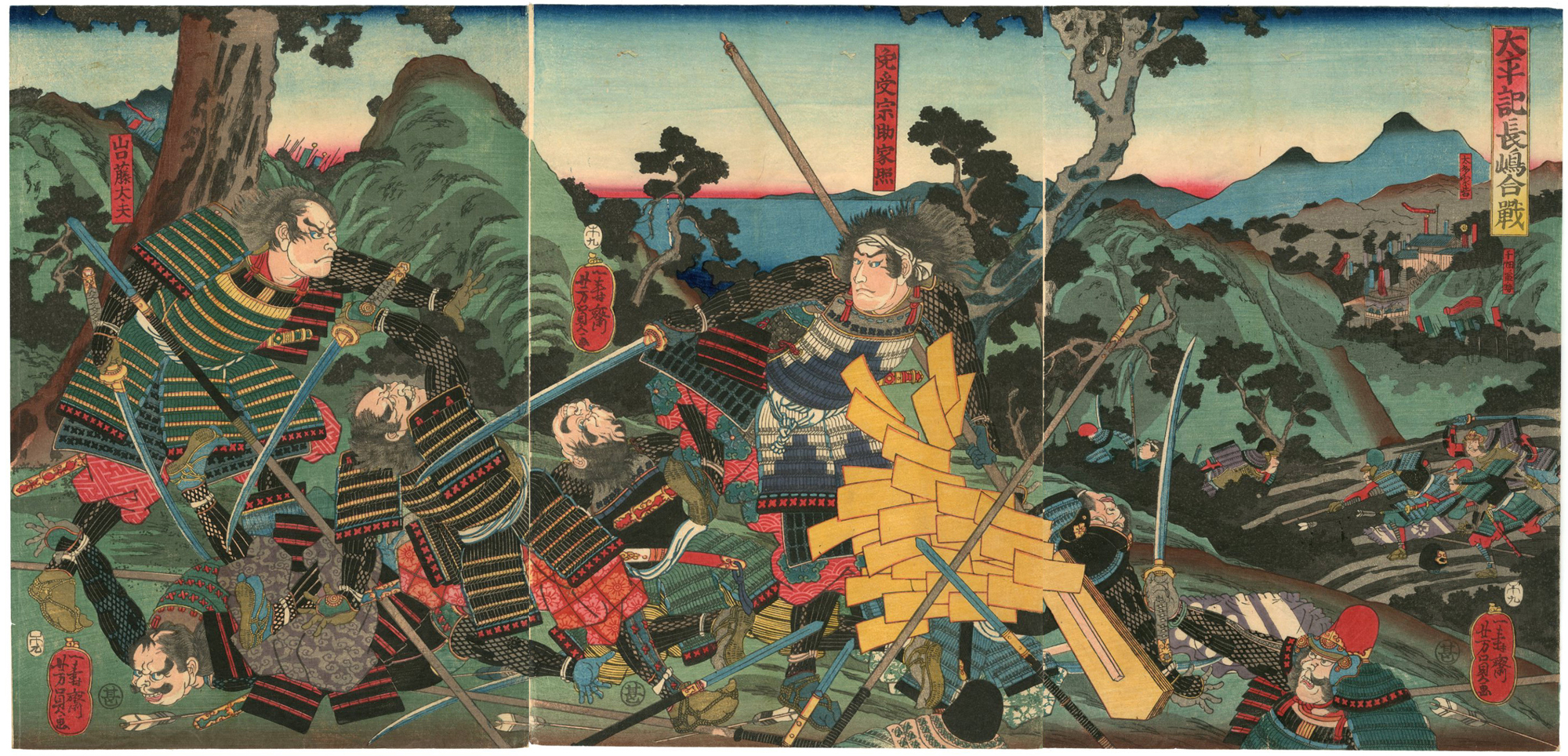
An ukiyo-e of the Sieges of Nagashima. During the second siege, Iga contributed archers to the defense of the fortress.

In 1573, the shogun Yoshiaki attempted to thwart the power Nobunaga held over him and allied with the Rokkaku and the Kōka and Iga ikkis. Yoshiaki began constructing a castle next to Lake Biwa. The castle was half-finished and the garrison, which included Kōka and Iga troops, was small when Nobunaga attacked. The defenders fled and begged for mercy, and Nobunaga immediately demolished the castle. The same year, archers from Iga and Kōka assisted the Ikkō-ikki against Nobunaga as he retreated from the second siege of Nagashima. Yoshiaki continued his resistance to Nobunaga but in late summer, 1573, he was defeated and forced to surrender. A later record states that in 1573 some Iga-shū supported Shibata Katsuie and other retainers of Nobunaga in defeating the Azai clan in the Siege of Odani Castle. The following year, Nobunaga defeated Rokkaku and the Kōka ikki. According to a document preserved by the Yamanaka family, on March 27, 1574, the remnants of the Kōka jizamurai surrendered to Nobunaga. On May 3, Rokkaku Yoshikata, who had fled to Kōka, surrendered to Nobunaga.

==== Tenshō Iga War ====
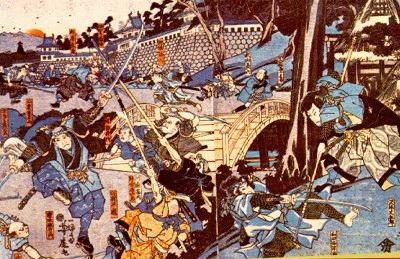
Artistic rendering of the 1581 destruction of Iga

The Iga ikki was destroyed in 1581 by Oda Nobunaga in the conclusion of the Tenshō Iga War. The war began after the Oda clan staged a coup on the territory of the Kitabatake clan in the adjoining Ise Province. The Kitabatake clan had recently commissioned a castle in the center of Iga, Maruyama, and with the Oda takeover, members of the Kitabatake family took refuge in Iga and sought aid from Mōri Motonari. In 1579 Oda Nobukatsu launched an invasion to take the unfinished castle in Maruyama and subjugate Iga. The campaign proved disastrous for Nobukatsu, who had underestimated the mix of peasants and local warriors: the effectiveness of their tactics, their strategic advantage conveyed by their knowledge of the local terrain, and their capacity for organization and mobilization. The historian Stephen Turnbull summarized the defeat as "one of the greatest triumphs of unconventional warfare over traditional samurai tactics in the whole of Japanese history." Nobunaga was enraged at his son and told him that his biggest mistake was not to use ninjas in his assault on Iga. In 1580, Iga counter-attacked by covertly infiltrating Sakaibe Castle. In the middle of the night, they crossed the wet moat from the south and were the first to arrive at each entrance. According to the narrator of the incident, Ichiborō, to enter the castle was an "event without parallel." In 1581, ninja were sent out on an espionage mission, holding captives for ransom in order to accomplish the mission.

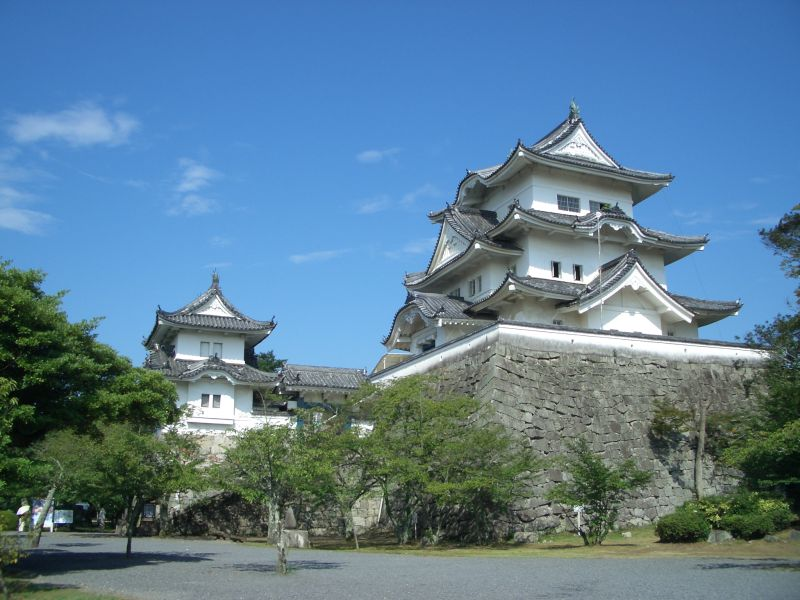
A reconstruction of Iga Ueno Castle, first built in 1585, shortly after the conquest of Ueno by forces of Nobunaga.

The resistance by Iga was not left unpunished. Nobunaga personally led a much larger army of 40,000-60,000 on a second invasion in 1581, guided by two samurai from northeast Iga and attacking from seven sides. Troops from Kōka are mentioned among Nobunaga's forces, indicating that its surrender in 1574 had forced it to terminate the alliance with Iga and instead oppose that confederacy. This time the invasion was successful. The guns and cannon employed by Nobunaga crushed the earth-and-wood fortresses of Iga. Last stands were made at Hajiyama, near Ueno, and at Kashiwara Castle, near Maruyama. After some initial success in defending themselves, the forces at Hajiyama were then trapped inside the complex of fortifications and temples as they were set on fire. Takino Jurobei commanded the final stand at Kashiwara. When defeat was imminent, he surrendered the fort and he, his officers, and half the population of the castle fled. Because of Iga's fierce resistance in this and the prior invasion, the political and social structures that it had created were destroyed, and most of the temple, forts, and villages in Iga burned. Some ninja fled to the mountains of Kii Province, while many others took shelter in Mikawa Province, where they served Tokugawa Ieyasu. Sporadic guerrilla resistance continued for years and was ended when Tokugawa integrated the Iga forces into his military as auxiliaries. A castle was constructed in Ueno in 1585 by Tsutsui Sadatsugu. It was severely damaged by a storm in 1612, and then gradually abandoned. It was reconstructed in 1935.

== Subsequent ninja activities ==
=== Purported Tokugawa escape through Iga ===
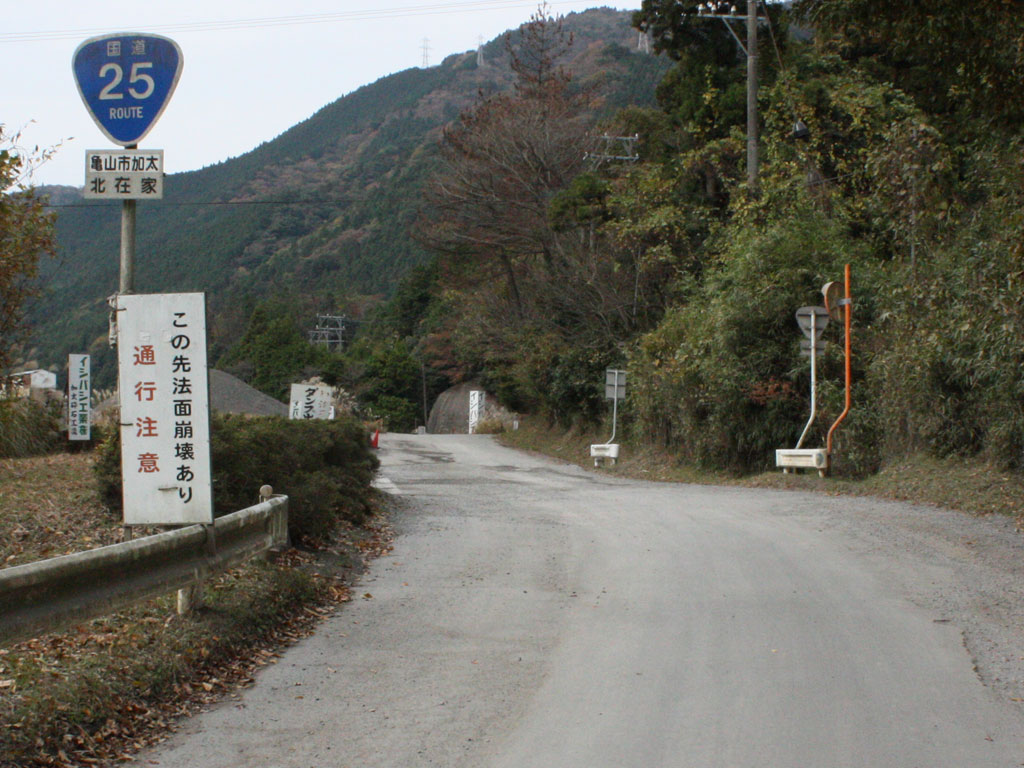
Kada pass, believed to be the road taken by Ieyasu Tokugawa in his journey.

Many of the Iga and Kōka ninja offered their services to Tokugawa Ieyasu after Oda Nobunaga was assassinated In June 1582. Specifically, it was reported by Edo period traditional records that Hattori Hanzō, a Tokugawa vassal from Iga, negotiated with Iga ninjas to hire them as guards to help Tokugawa escape to Kii Province and avoid capture by Nobunaga's assassin. The local Kōka and Iga ninjas under Hanzo who allegedly helped Ieyasu to travel into safety consisted of 300 soldiers.

Modern Japanese historians such as Tatsuo Fujita have expressed doubts about the credibility of story regarding Hattori Hanzō's ninja helping Ieyasu, given that the story does not appear until the 18th century during the rule of Tokugawa Yoshimune.

=== Edo period activities ===
Ninja activities continued in Iga into the 17th century, servicing the Tokugawa shogunate. Fujibayashi Yasutake, a member of the Fujibayashi family which was a prominent ruling family in Iga, composed the Bansenshūkai, an anthology he alleged contained the collective knowledge of ninja skills and history in Iga and Kōka, in 1676. The original manuscript has been lost, with the oldest extant copy being of the second volume and dating to 1748. The poet Matsuo Bashō was born in Ueno to a powerful ninja family and was trained in ninjutsu before he left to study haiku.

During Ieyasu's campaigns to unite Japan under his authority, many ninja from Iga and Kōka contributed their skills. After the establishment of the Tokugawa shogunate, many ninja turned to farming in Iga and Kōka, while others went on to serve as castle guards. Those who served at the forefront of battles for Ieyasu were granted residential land in the vicinity of Edo Castle. The final instance of combat involving ninja was the 1637 Shimabara Rebellion, after which they mostly served as spies and bodyguards. The last documented use of ninja in the shogunate was in 1853 when ninja allegedly were sent to investigate the arrival of the Perry Expedition.

== Government and military organization ==
The Iga ikki functioned as a province-wide sō, that is, individual villages banded together, similar to a European medieval commune. Typically, including in Iga, the leadership of sō consisted of kokujin (the jizamurai) and the dogō (villagers) and lesser farmers. Pierre Souyri argues that the inhabitants of Iga and Kōka formed these collectives not out of a commitment to a particular ideology but out of necessity. The defeated jizamurai who took refuge in the area trained the local inhabitants and together they desperately fought to maintain their social status and autonomy. By 1477 Iga was known for rejecting the authority of the shugo. In times of military crisis, the shugo would sometimes temporarily exercise his powers in nearby Yamato Province, which normally was under autonomous rule by Kōfuku-ji via the authority of the Fujiwara clan.

The documented ruling families were the Hattori and their cadet branches of Momochi and Fujibayashi. Some of the most famous ninja commanders came from these families, namely the legendary figures Momochi Sandayu, Fujibayashi Nagato no Kami, and Hattori Hanzō, all three of whom Okuse labeled jōnin. John Man lists them as officers of Takino Jurobei. According to the Bansenshūkai, the Momochi oversaw southern Iga, the Fujibayashi northeastern Iga, and the Hattori, western Iga. During the fall of Iga to Nobunaga, Sandayu either perished or escaped and went into hiding. Some other important kin groups which Iga units organized themselves around were the Kitakata-clan, Fukuchi-clan and Hioki-clan. At the local level, individual villages formed dōmyōsō ("leagues of villages").

Around the year 1560, a constitutional document was drawn up for Iga outlining principles of self-defense and participation of villages based on voluntary association. It also detailed an alliance and defense pact with Kōka. Eleven points were laid out in the constitution:

1. A requirement that the village collective, the sokoku, to join as one to resist the invading armies from any other domain.
2. A stipulation that whenever an alert is sent signaling that an enemy is spotted at a gate, all the villages should ring every bell, and every member should take up defensive positions and encamp with food, weapons, and shields.
3. Conscription of every person from age 17 through 50. For prolonged campaigns, article three called for a rotation system to be set up. Commanders were to be appointed in every village and area. The elders of the collective were to pray at the temples for prosperity of the province, and the young participants partake in the camps.
4. Hikan (retainers or servants) must swear loyalty to their lord regardless of the situation of the land.
5. Permission for even ashigaru (peasant infantry) to capture enemy castles and stated that ashigaru who successfully capture a castle in an enemy land would be promoted to samurai.
6. Severe penalties for treason. If any member of the collective let in an invading army, or shared intelligence with any enemy, their entire clan would be annihilated. Any member of the collective who shared intelligence regarding someone's treason as outlined above would be generously rewarded.
7. Any ashigaru or samurai is forbidden from serving the Miyoshi clan.
8. States that any member who refused to pay the Yumi Hanjo tax (presumably a war fund), they and their father, sons, and brothers would be ineligible for benefits from the fund for 10 years, and would be excluded from using the Yado Okuri or Mukae transport relay stations.
9. Prohibition against disorderly conduct or violence for anyone positioned in a village or camp within the borders of the alliance.
10. The collective is forbidden from hiring any rōnin who formerly served in the military from Yamato Province, due to that province's long-standing attacks against the collective.
11. Calls for an alliance with Kōka

To coordinate the Iga–Kōka alliance, the respective confederacies frequently held "field meetings" along their border to discuss issues of governance and cooperation. This co-operation within and between Iga and Kōka was in tension with constant petty feuds in each of the regions that helped contribute to the development of the leagues in the first place.

Leadership of the confederation was hierarchical: Military bands formed around the leadership of a lord. They thus were composed of both peasants and jizamurai, but the latter trained and oversaw the former. The ninjas were divided between high and low classes and only the upper-class ninja were given the prestigious missions. Though these class divisions were well-established, social mobility was possible as peasants who distinguished themselves in battle could be promoted to samurai. Each band comprised from 100 to 300 men. Even though the sō was embedded within a feudal hierarchy, it had democratic tendencies and the possibility of social mobility through promotion meant that class differences could be overcome. Informers and traitors were severely punished by confiscation of their property followed by beheading. Overseeing the entire confederation was military council of elders among the jizamurai. John Man and Vladimir V. Maltsev claim that this council consisted of 66 members with a headquarters at the Buddhist temple, Heirakuji, in Ueno (located at the present-day site of Iga Ueno Castle). This "parliament" of Iga also met in various locations throughout the province. Conversely, Eiko Ikegami states that 10 magistrates oversaw the collective, with important matters discussed at meetings with the entire membership of the ikki, while a 2017 book published by Mie University argues that the bands of clans overseeing different portions of territory were overseen by 12 leaders known as hyojo-shu. According to the latter work, important decisions made by the hyojo-shu were circulated in writing among the various bands and representatives of those bands would pledge loyalty in various written forms, such as renbanjo joint agreements or kishomon pledges to gods. The lords within Iga were highly independent. While they might have constantly negotiated master-subordinate relationships with daimyo, they might also have independently worked as mercenaries on occasion.

The Russian economist Vladimir V. Maltsev hypothesizes that the formation of a private and voluntary government allowed Iga the stability to reap profits from its mercenary market while remaining effectively stateless. In most of Japan after the Onin War, the loss of centralized power and the ensuing banditry, peasant uprisings, and feuds between and predatory taxation and raids by local daimyō resulted in insecure property rights, thin markets, and greatly weakened provision of public goods. In Iga and Kōka, this economic situation offered a lucrative mercenary market. Conventionally in economics, a formal state is deemed necessary to protect complex trade arrangements. However, Maltsev hypothesizes that in the chaotic and violent environment of the Sengoku period, state formation was cost-prohibitive and potentially hazardous to Iga. Instead, the model of private government practiced by various ikki was much more attractive. Particularly as outlined in the c. 1560 constitution, the ban on violent altercations within the alliance and defensive measures against external invasion secured military protection, and the provision of relay stations and a war fund secured economic productivity. Maltsev claims that the requirement and expectation of certain behaviors delineated in the constitution and the enumerated penalties, combined with a relatively homogenous identity in the mountainous region, constrained abusive behaviors. And the voluntary nature of the confederacy resulted in a Tiebout model of government.

Okuse Heishichirō, the writer who in the mid-20th century greatly contributed to the development of ninja myth, outlined a three-tiered social structure in Iga. At the top were jōnin, the head families. Depending on their wealth, the comparable rank of a jonin could range from that of a minor daimyō to a jizamurai village headman. Below the jonin were the chunin, the family's executive officers and leaders. Turnbull in his 2003 and 2007 books on the ninja speculates that the famous commander Tateoka Doshun was of this rank. Below them were the genin, the agents typically sent out on missions. However, in Turnbull's 2017 revisionist work he notes the source for these terms, the Bansenshūkai, lists these as skills rather than social rank. Thus, Turnbull argues, this ranking system could be of Okuse's own invention.

== Religion ==
Within Iga Province, esoteric and ascetic forms of shugendō, a syncretism of Shinto and Buddhism – specifically, Tendai and the Shingon school of Tantric Buddhism – was the prevalent religion. The Buddha statues dating back to the Heian period are still displayed in the present-day. The Fujibayashi clan worshipped at the Tejikara-jinja Shinto shrine. Fujibayashi Nagato no Kami was known for his specialty in fire practices at the site, which are commemorated in the present-day with fireworks. The Hattori clan was associated with Aekuni Shrine and is thought to have originated the Kurondo Matsuri in which participants dress entirely in black. The Iga-shū sometimes facilitated important ceremonial events: The funeral of Shinsei, the founder of the Tendai sect Tendaishinsei-shu, in 1495 was mainly held by influential samurai from Iga, and in 1580 Iga jizamurai held a festival at Aekuni Shrine, the Ichinomiya for the Province, attended by Kanemi Yoshida, a priest from Yoshida Shrine in Kyoto.
