= Siege of Hikida Castle =

Siege of Hikida
- Part of the Sengoku period
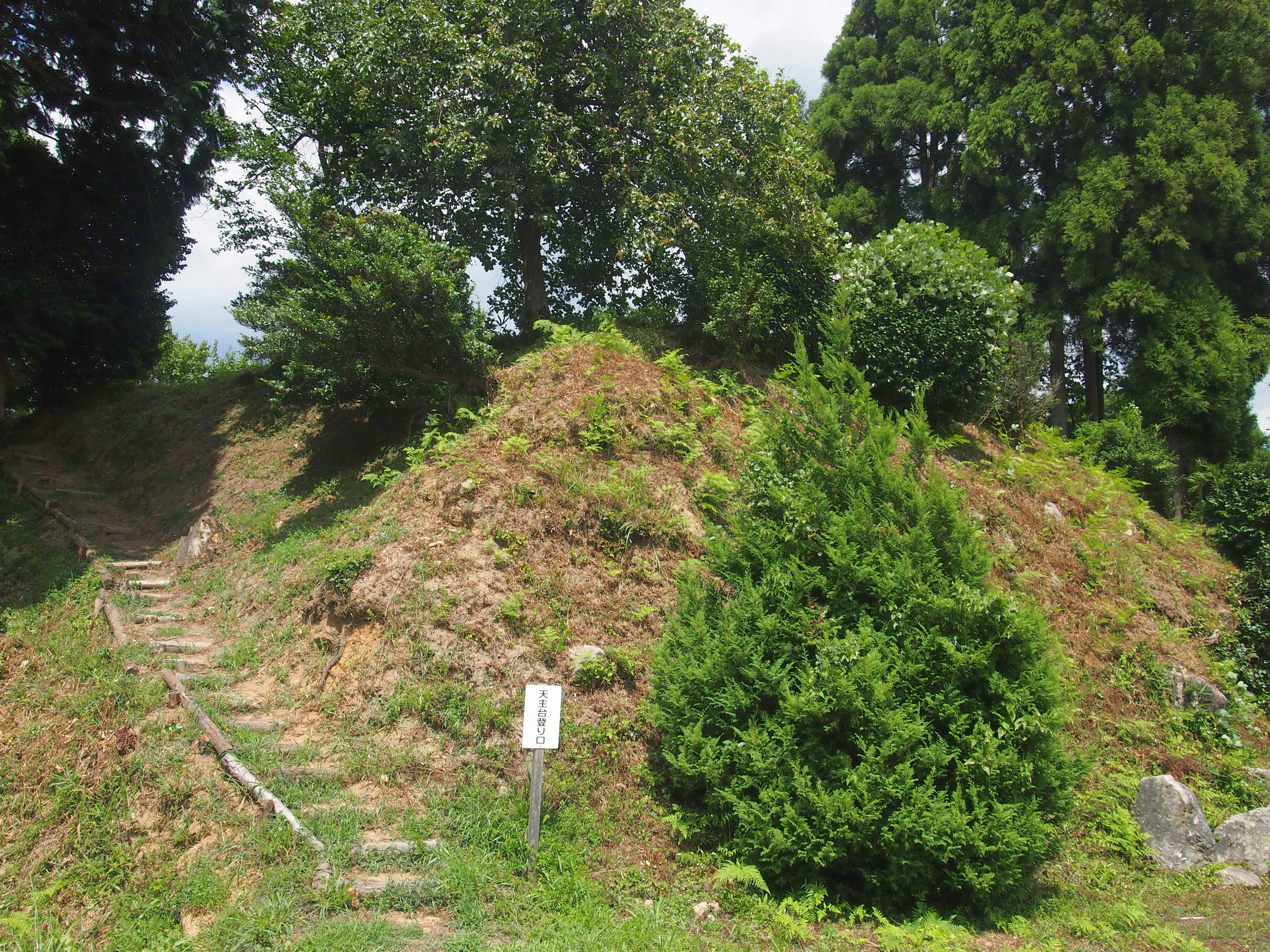
- Steps at the Hikida Castle ruins
Date	September 1573
Location	Hikida Castle, Echizen Province (present-day Tsuruga, Fukui Prefecture) 35°35′59.4″N 136°5′59.2″E
Result	Oda Nobunaga victory

Belligerents
forces of Oda Nobunaga	forces of Asakura Yoshikage

Commanders and leaders
Oda Nobunaga	Asakura Yoshikage

Strength
30,000	20,000
- Location of Hikida Castle in Fukui Prefecture

The 1573 siege of Hikida Castle (疋壇城の戦い, Hikida-jō no Tatakai) was one of many battles the warlord Oda Nobunaga fought against the Azai and Asakura clans during Japan's Sengoku period. These two families were among the staunchest opponents of Nobunaga's attempts to seize land and power for himself.

Hikida Castle (疋壇城, also written 疋田城) stood at Hikida, in present-day Tsuruga, where the routes from Ōmi pass through a narrow valley into Echizen, one of the proposed sites of the ancient Arachi Barrier.

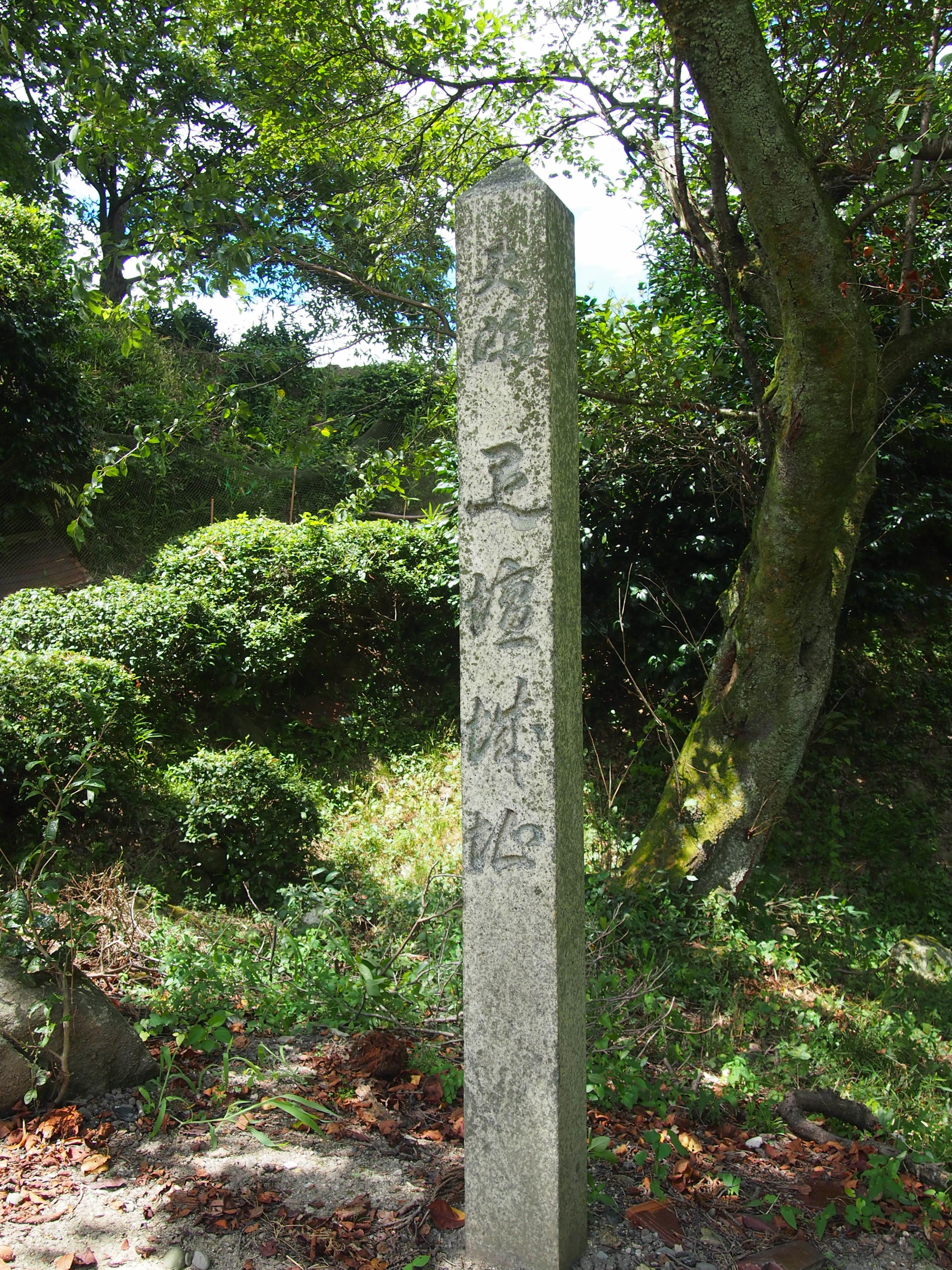
Monument at the Hikida Castle ruins

The castle was built during the Bunmei era (1469–1487) by Hikida Tsushima-no-kami Hisayasu, a retainer of Asakura Takakage, the first Asakura lord of Ichijōdani. In 1570, during the Kanegasaki campaign, Nobunaga marched through Wakasa and made a surprise attack on Tsuruga, taking Tezutsuyama, Kanegasaki and Hikida castles in turn. When Azai Nagamasa sent troops to Kaizu and cut off his route home, Nobunaga withdrew through Wakasa to Kyoto.

In the summer of 1573, Nobunaga marched 30,000 troops from Gifu Castle into Ōmi Province to besiege Odani Castle, held by Azai Nagamasa. In response, Asakura Yoshikage led 20,000 troops to relieve the Azai garrison.

Yoshikage began to withdraw on the night of 8 September 1573 (Tenshō 1, 8th month, 12th day). The following night, Nobunaga's pursuing forces routed his army at Tonezaka, the pass from Yanagase in northern Ōmi to Tone in Tsuruga District, and Yoshikage lost most of his troops. He fled through Tsuruga and Fuchū (present-day Takefu, in Echizen) to Ichijōdani, and on 12 September withdrew to Ōno. Nobunaga followed him from Tsuruga to Fuchū and sent troops to destroy Ichijōdani. Hikida Castle fell during the Oda invasion and was dismantled.

== Aftermath ==
Later, Oda Nobunaga's forces advance to Echizen and attacked Ichijodani castle in September 1573, devastating the Asakura clan.

Fukui Prefecture designated the castle site a prefectural historic site on 3 December 1954. Part of the stone walls survives, along with what is thought to be the base of the keep.
