= Asakura Kagetake =

Japanese samurai

- Born: 1536
- Died: September 25, 1575 (aged 38–39)
- Military career
- Allegiance: Asakura clan
- Rank: commander
- Conflicts: Siege of Kanegasaki (1570); Battle of Anegawa (1570); Battle of Shimosakamoto (1570); Battle of Tonezaka (1573)

Asakura Kagetake (朝倉 景健; 1536 – September 25, 1575) was a Japanese samurai commander of the Sengoku era from Asakura clan.

In the 1570, he defended against an invasion by Oda Nobunaga into Echizen at Siege of Kanegasaki. In the same year, at the Battle of Anegawa, Kagetake was an Asakura Yoshikage army's "Commander in Chief" of Asakura forces. He lost against Tokugawa forces under Ieyasu and surround by Ieyasu second division under Honda Tadakatsu and Sakakibara Yasumasa. Following the battle of Anegawa, Kagetake's launch a counterattack at the battle of Shimosakamoto, his troops killed over 750 soldiers in the Oda army including Mori Yoshinari and Oda Nobuharu (Nobunaga’s younger brother).

In 1573, he led an Asakura army of 20,000 soldiers confronted 30,000 Oda troops under the direct command of Nobunaga, but defeated at the Battle of Tonezaka. After Asakura Yoshikage died in the Siege of Ichijodani Castle, Kagetake surrendered to Nobunaga.

In 1574, he responded to uprisings of the Echizen Ikkō-Ikki by surrendering, despite the ongoing struggle between the Ikkō sect and the Oda.

In 1575, after Nobunaga's army invaded Echizen Ikkō-Ikki, Nobunaga forced him to commit suicide.
