= Fukui Prefectural Ichijodani Asakura Family Site Museum =

- 福井県立一乗谷朝倉氏遺跡博物館

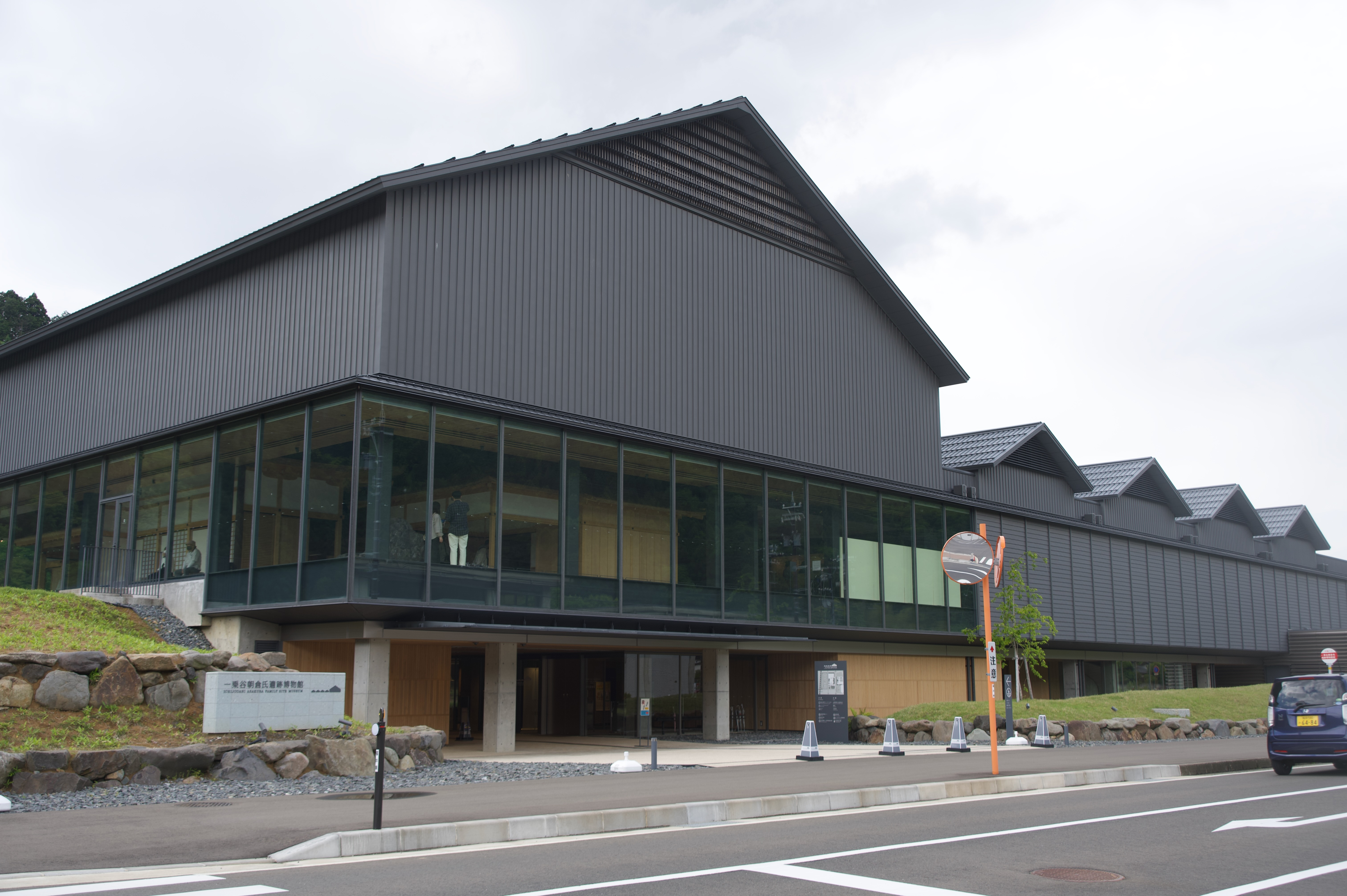
- Exterior view of the new museum building

- Location in Fukui Prefecture Location in Japan
- Established: 1981
- Location: 8-10 Abakanakajima-cho, Fukui City, Fukui Prefecture, Japan
- Coordinates: 36.0152°N 136.2989°E
- Type: Historical museum
- Public transit access: JR Etsumi-Hoku Line Ichijōdani Station
- Website: asakura-museum.pref.fukui.lg.jp

Fukui Prefectural Ichijodani Asakura Family Site Museum (福井県立一乗谷朝倉氏遺跡博物館, Fukui Kenritsu Ichijōdani Asakurashi Iseki Hakubutsukan) is a historical museum located in Fukui City, Fukui Prefecture, Japan. Asakura clan, a feudal lord in the Sengoku period, had their castle in the Ichijodani (Ichijo Valley), which was burnt down by Oda Nobunaga. The museum carries a collection of excavated remains from the valley and focuses on the history of the clan as well as living around the time.

== Overview ==
The museum is located in the eastern part of Fukui City, Fukui Prefecture. It is a historical museum featuring the Echizen Asakura clan, which flourished in Echizen Province (present-day eastern Fukui Prefecture). The Asakura clan established its territory in the area in 1471 during the Sengoku Period and had a castle in Ichijodani. However, the castle and the town was later burnt down to ash by Oda Nobunaga. The museum opened in 1981. In October 2022, a new museum building opened to the public in an adjacent block.

The museum exhibits a 3D model of the terrain, a reconstructed model of Yoshikage Asakura's castle, and excavated remains such as ceramics, stone, wood, and metal objects from Ichijodani. It covers the history of Asakura clan as well as the life of people during the days (religion, housing, food, daily goods, etc.). In addition to the permanent exhibition, the museum holds special exhibitions and publishes books.

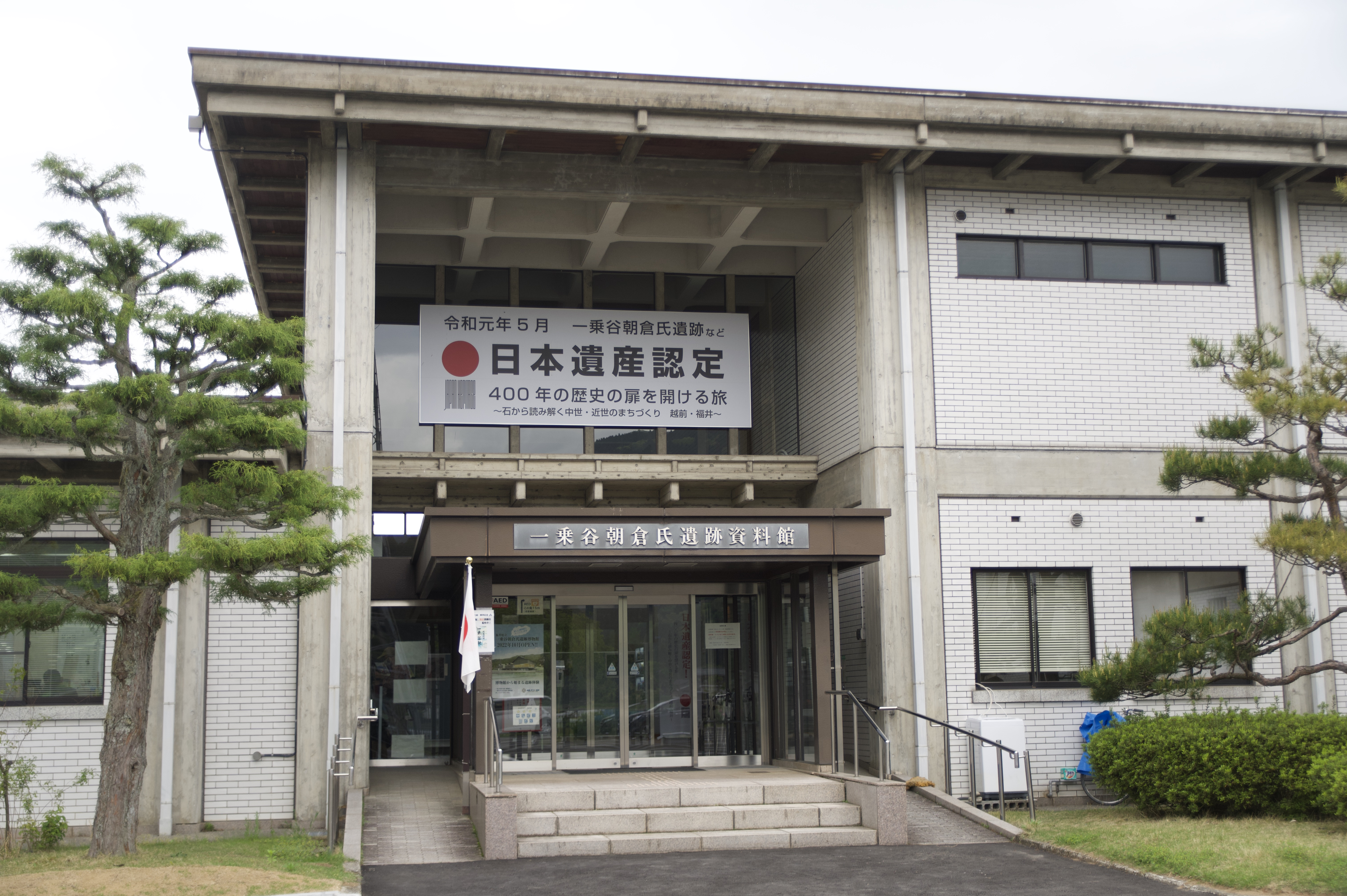
Exterior view of the original museum building, now a branch exhibition hall

== Cultural Properties ==
=== Important Cultural Properties ===
The following goods excavated from Ichijodani are designated as Important Cultural Properties by Japanese government.

Ceramic and clay artifacts: 1,246 items
Glassware 1 item
Wooden artifacts: 267 items
Wooden letter and ink-writing wooden products: 184 items
Lacquerware: 28 items
Stoneware 144 items
Metalware 456 items
Bone and antler ware: 12 items
Cloth remnants: 2 items
Ink stick: 1 item
Paper: 1 piece
Carbonized rice: 1 item

== Access ==
- Take JR Etsumi-Hoku Line from Fukui Station and get off at Ichijōdani Station. A few minutes walk from the station.
- Free shuttle bus Asakura-Yumemaru from/to the center of Ichijodani excavation site is also available on weekends.

== See also ==
- Asakura clan
- Ichijōdani Asakura Family Historic Ruins
