= Siege of Ichijōdani Castle =

1573 siege

- Part of the Sengoku period
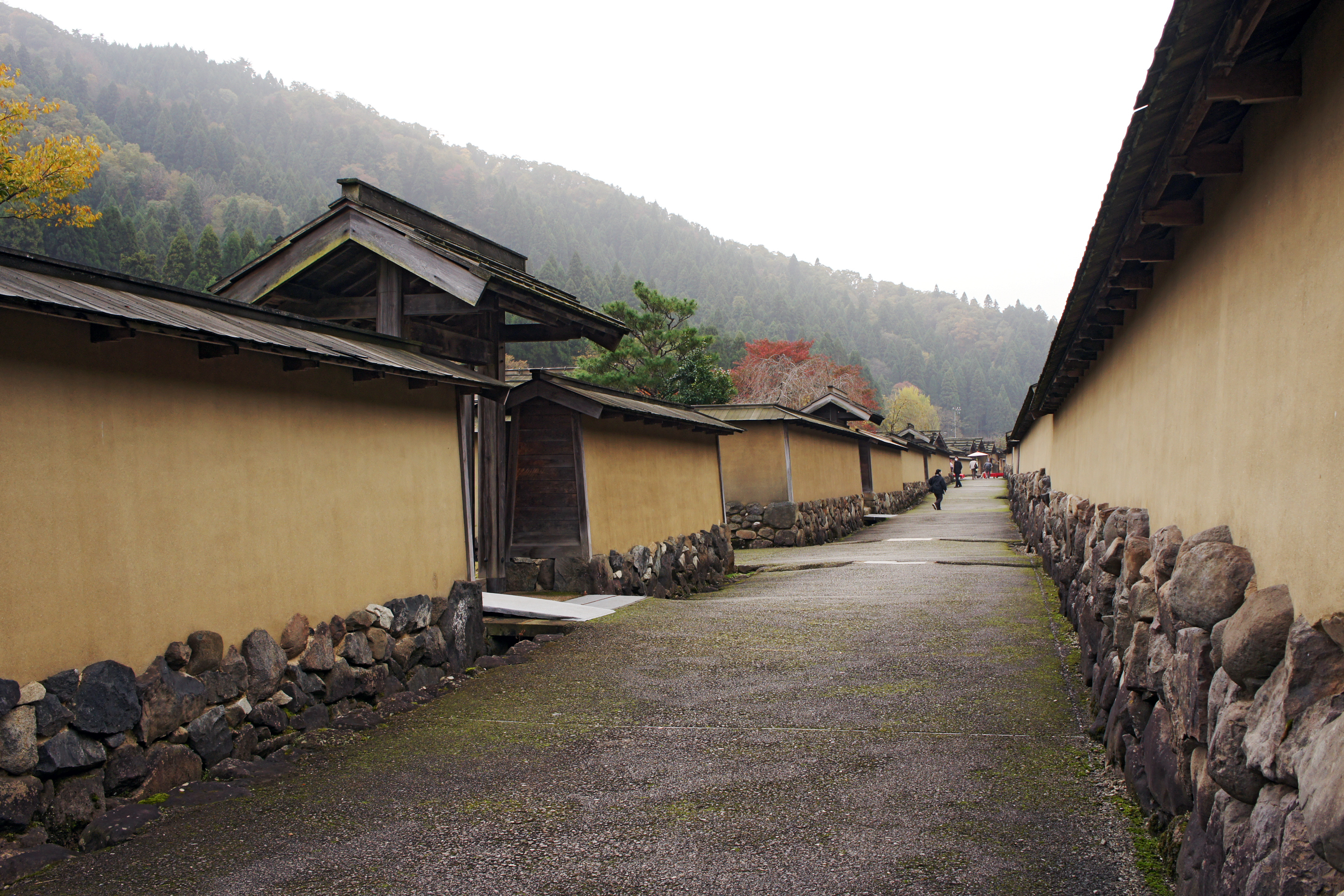
- Reconstructed castle town on the site of Ichijōdani Castle, Fukui prefecture
| Date | September, 1573 |
| Location | Ichijōdani Castle, Echizen Province, Japan 35.999474°N 136.29557°E |
| Result | Oda clan victory: Asakura clan destroyed |

Belligerents
| forces of Oda Nobunaga | forces of Asakura Yoshikage |

Commanders and leaders
| Oda Nobunaga; Sakuma Nobumori; Shibata Katsuie; Niwa Nagahide; Takigawa Kazumasu; Hashiba Hideyoshi; Inaba Yoshimichi; Andō Morinari; Kutsuki Mototsuna | Asakura Yoshikage †; Asakura Kagetake; Asakura Kageakira (executed); Saito Tatsuoki † |

Strength
| 30,000 | 20,000 |

Casualties and losses
| Unknown | 3,000+ |

The 1573 siege of Ichijōdani Castle (一乗谷城の戦い, Ichijōdani-jō no Tatakai) was undertaken by Oda Nobunaga, a powerful warlord (daimyō) of Japan's Sengoku period. It was one of several actions taken in a series of campaigns against the Asakura and Azai clans, which opposed his growing power.

Ichijōdani Castle, the castle home of Asakura Yoshikage, was one of several lavishly furnished castles which can be said to typify the Azuchi-Momoyama period. Excavations and research at the ruins of the castle have revealed that, much like Toyotomi Hideyoshi's castle at Fushimi, Ichijōdani was a luxury home with a library, garden, and elegantly decorated rooms.

== Prelude ==
Nobunaga led an army of 30,000 soldiers, departing from Gifu Castle to invade Ōmi Province. Nobunaga marched to Odani Castle to surrounding and besieged the castle, which was held by Azai Nagamasa.

In the meantime, Asakura Yoshikage, leading 20,000 forces to relieve and reinforce the Azai garrison. However, Oda forces turn around and Yoshikage came under attack by Nobunaga's army, later he sought refuge in Hikida Castle, and came under siege at Hikida by Oda forces. Hikida castle fell on August 10, and Asakura fled back to his home province of Echizen.

== Battle ==
Later in September 1573, Nobunaga marched to Echizen Province, he battled against Yoshikage at Tonezaka (Battle of Tonezaka), Yoshikage was defeated, and Saito Tatsuoki who become guest commander of Asakura, was also killed in this battle, at the age of 26.

Nobunaga pursued Yoshikage and attacked the town of Ichijōdani, seizing control from the Asakura clan and burning it down. Yoshikage fled Ichijōdani castle with only his own troops, and upon the urging of Asakura Kageakira, headed for the Rokubō-kenshō monastery proposed by Kageakira as a temporary place to stay. However, Yoshikage was thoroughly surrounded by troops under Kageakira who betrayed him. As the attendants fought and died, Yoshikage killed himself.

== Aftermath ==
After Yoshikage died, Asakura Kageakira then brought Yoshikage's head, along with Yoshikage's mother (Kōtokuin), wife and children as hostages, and surrendered to Nobunaga. Kageakira made efforts to negotiate with Oda for his lives and status, but the Oda army executed him.

Later, Oda Nobunaga's forces returned to northern Ōmi and attacked Odani castle in October, 1573, devastating Azai Nagamasa and the Azai clan.

== See also ==
- Battle of Anegawa
- Siege of Odani Castle
