= Maeba Yoshitsugu =

Samurai

Maeba Yoshitsugu (前波 吉継, 1524 – February 11, 1574) was a samurai retainer beneath the clan of Asakura throughout the late Sengoku period of Feudal Japan. He was also known as Katsurada Nagatoshi (桂田 長俊). He held the fortress of Kanegasaki in Siege of Kanegasaki (1570) against Oda Nobunaga.

After the defeat of the Asakura, Maeba defected to Nobunaga. He was killed in a revolt supported by Toda Nagashige in 1574.
