= Asakura Sadakage =

Asakura Sadakage (朝倉 貞景, March 3, 1473 – April 11, 1512) was the son of Asakura Ujikage and proclaimed 9th head of Asakura during the early Sengoku Period of Feudal Japan.
