= Asakura Kageaki =

Japanese samurai

Asakura Kageaki (朝倉 景鏡; 1529 – May 4, 1574)

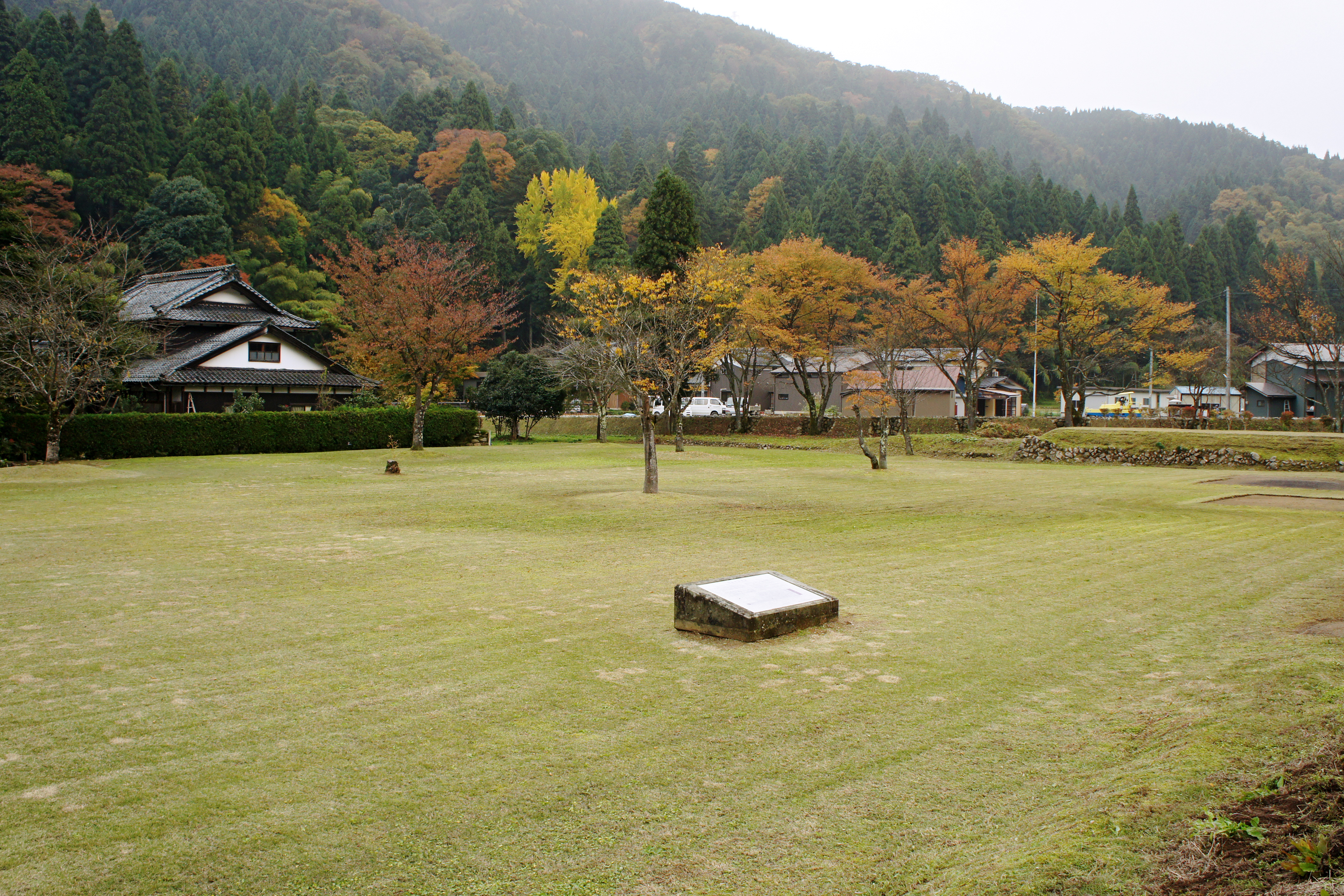
Asakura Kageakira Yakata-ato of Ichijōdani Asakura Family Historic Ruins in Fukui, Fukui prefecture, Japan.

, also known as Asakura Kageakira, was a Japanese samurai warrior of the later Sengoku period.

In 1573, after Asakura Yoshikage was defeated by Oda Nobunaga at Battle of Tonezaka, Yoshikage fled to Ichijodani castle with only his own troops and, upon the urging of Kageaki, went to the Ono district. Later, at the Rokubō-kenshō monastery proposed by Kageaki as a temporary place to stay, Yoshikage was thoroughly surrounded by 200 troops under Kageaki who betrayed his lord. As the attendants fought and died, Yoshikage suddenly killed himself. Kageaki then brought Yoshikage’s head, along with Yoshikage’s mother (Kōtokuin), wife and children as hostages, and surrendered to Nobunaga.

As a condition of the surrender, the lives were spared of very close relatives of Yoshikage including his infant son and designated heir (Aiōmaru) and cherished consort (Koshōshō). Some of Yoshikage’s attendants did not martyr themselves and survived the battle. Efforts were made by Kageaki to negotiate for their lives and future status but the dependents of Yoshikage were executed by the Oda army while in transit.
