= Asakura Ujikage =

- 朝倉氏景

8th Head of Asakura clan
- Era(s): Muromachi-Sengoku

Personal details
- Born: Bun'an 6, 5th day of the 6th month April 27, 1449
- Died: Bunmei 18, 4th day of the 7th month August 3, 1486 (aged 37)
- Relations: Asakura Norikage (brother)
- Children: 2, including Asakura Sadakage
- Parent: Asakura Toshikage (father)

Asakura Ujikage (朝倉 氏景; April 27, 1449 – August 3, 1486) was the 8th head of the Asakura clan during the period of the Ashikaga shogunate. His rule also coincided with the period of the Ōnin War (1467–1477) and the early years of the Sengoku period of Feudal Japan. He is remembered as an excellent swordsman, since with the famous katana Kotegiri Masamune in his hands, he managed to cut through the gauntlet of an enemy samurai in battle, cutting off his arm.
