= Ichijōdani Station =

Railway station in Fukui, Fukui Prefecture, Japan

Ichijōdani Station 一乗谷駅
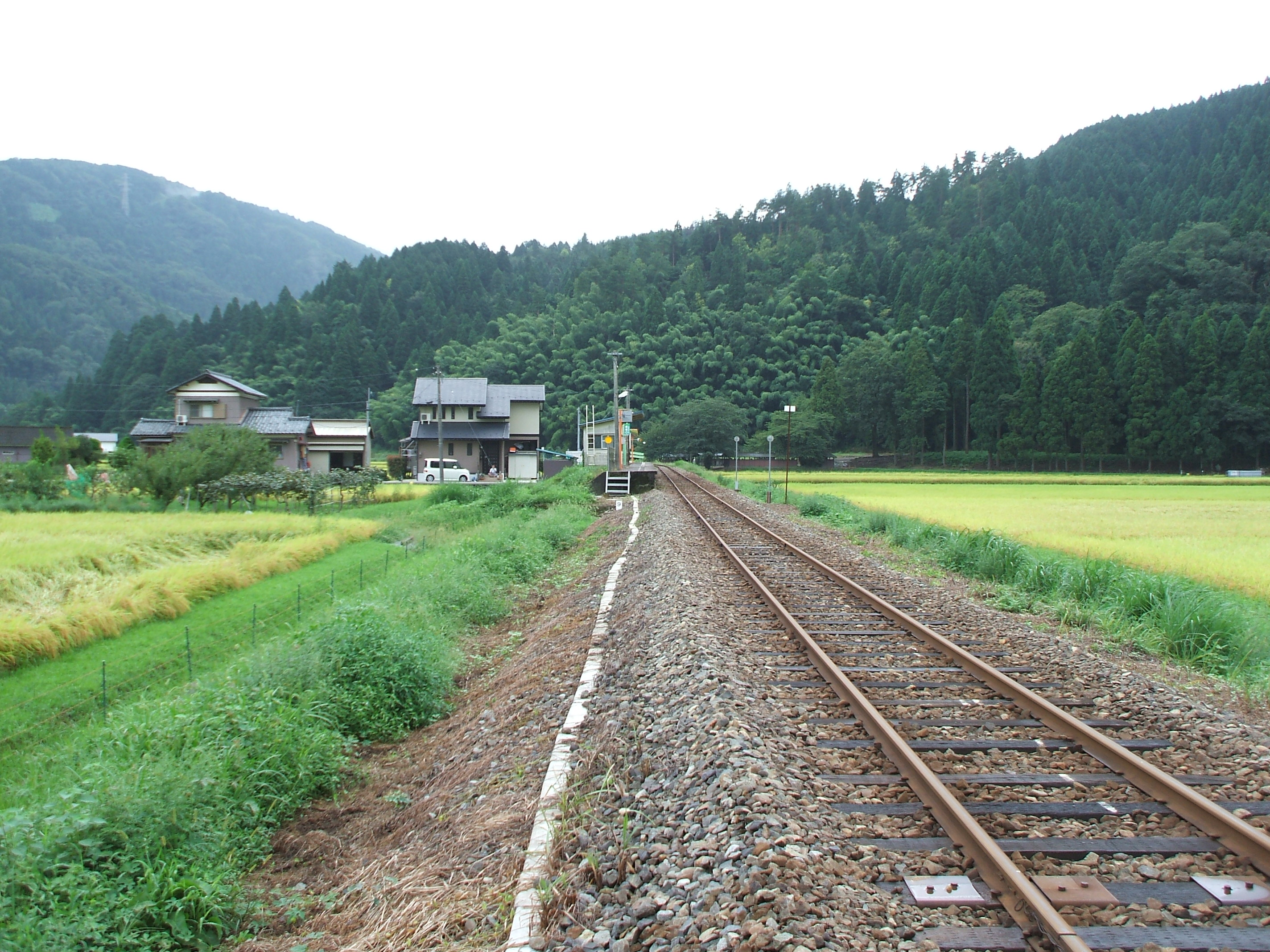
- Ichijōdani Station in September 2007

General information
- Location: Abakanakajimacho, Fukui, Fukui Prefecture 910-2151; Japan
- Coordinates: 36°00′49″N 136°17′51″E
- Operator: JR West
- Line: ■ Etsumi-Hoku Line (Kuzuryū Line)
- Distance: 8.3 km from Echizen-Hanandō
- Platforms: 1 side platform
- Tracks: 1

Other information
- Status: Unstaffed
- Website: Official website

History
- Opened: December 15, 1960

Passengers
- FY2016: 13 daily
Location
- Location within Japan

Ichijōdani Station (一乗谷駅, Ichijōdani-eki) is a JR West railway station in the city of Fukui, Fukui Prefecture, Japan.

== Lines ==
Ichijōdani Station is served by the Etsumi-Hoku Line, and is located 8.3 kilometers from the terminus of the line at Echizen-Hanandō and 10.9 kilometers from Fukui.

== Station layout ==
The station consists of one ground-level side platform serving single bi-directional track. There is no station building, but only a shelter on the platform. The station is unattended.

== Adjacent stations ==
| « | Service | » |
Etsumi Hoku Line
| Echizen-Tōgō | Local | Echizen-Takada |

== History ==
Ichijōdani Station opened on December 15, 1960. With the privatization of Japanese National Railways (JNR) on 1 April 1987, the station came under the control of JR West. The station was closed from July 18, 2004 to June 30, 2007 due to damages to the tracks following torrential rains, and services were temporality replaced by a bus service.

== Surrounding area ==
- Ichijōdani Asakura Family Historic Ruins. The lower gate is about 5 min walk from the station and the center of village is about 30 min. Free shuttle bus serviceAsakura-Yumemaru from Ichijodani Asakura Family Site Museum is also available on weekends to reach the directly to the center of village.
- Fukui Prefectural Ichijodani Asakura Family Site Museum. Temporally closed now for relocation to a new and larger building, planned to open in October 2022.
- Asuwa River

== Local Transport ==
- Asakura Shiryokan-mae (Entrance to Asakura Family Site Museum) bus stop. Keifuku Bus Route 62 Togo Line, Route 55/59 Ono Line, free shuttle "Asakura Yumemaru-go".
- Bicycle rental. Bicycles can be rented at the Ichijodani Asakura Family Site Museum. However, the museum is closed until October 2022.

== See also ==
- List of railway stations in Japan
