= Asakura Kagetsura =

Asakura Kagetsura (朝倉 景連, ? – 1570) was a senior retainer of the Asakura clan throughout the mid-Sengoku Period of Feudal Japan.
