= Asakura Yoshikage =

Japanese daimyō (1533–1573)

- 朝倉 義景
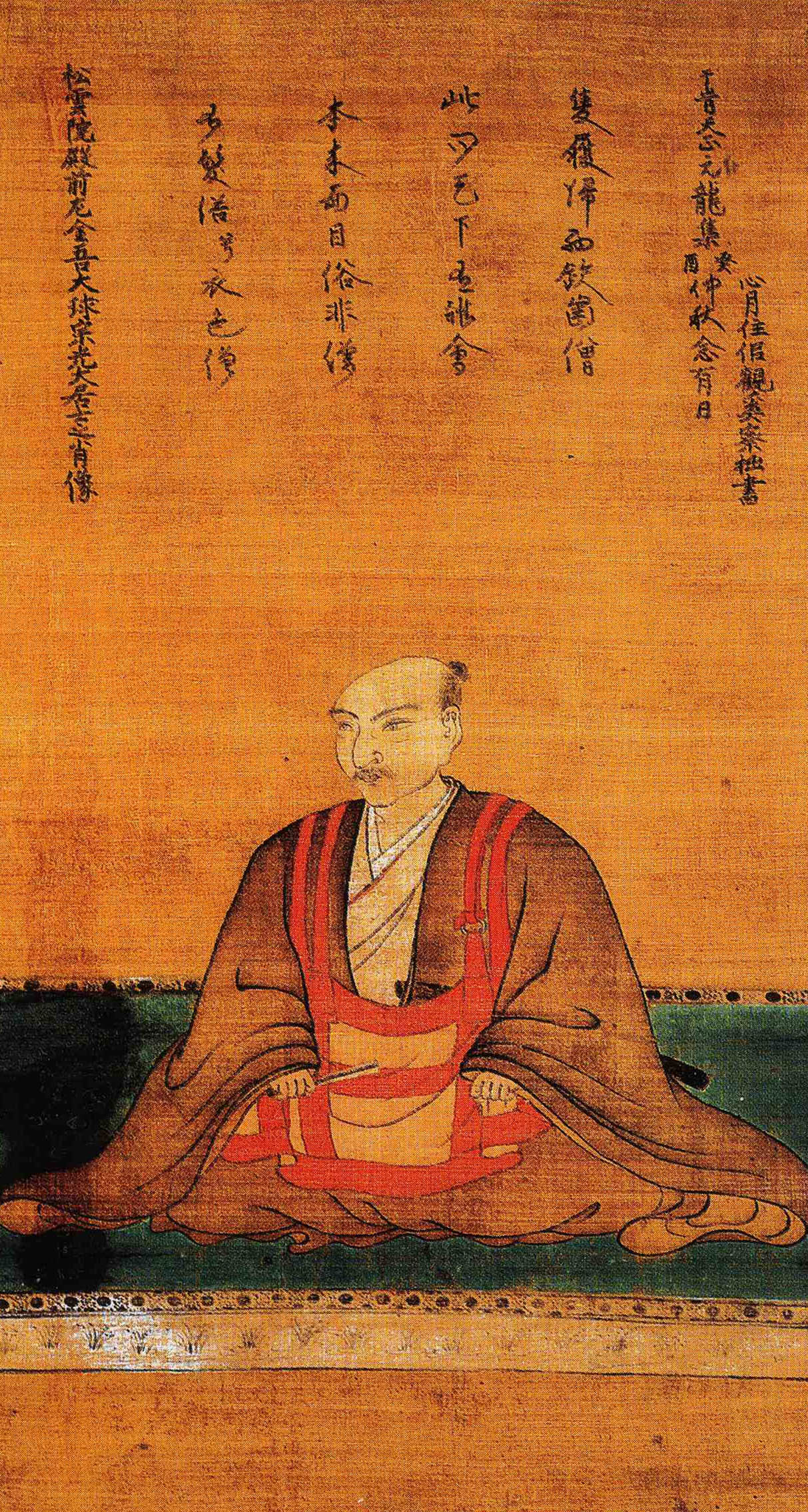

5th Head of Asakura clan
- In office 1548–1573
- Preceded by: Asakura Takakage

Personal details
- Born: October 12, 1533 Ichijōdani Castle
- Died: September 16, 1573 (aged 39) Rokubō Kenshō-ji, Ōno
- Spouse: Daughter of Hosokawa Harumoto
- Parents: Asakura Takakage (father); Daughter of Takeda Motomitsu (mother)

Military service
- Allegiance: Ashikaga shogunate Azai clan
- Unit: Asakura clan
- Battles/wars: Siege of Kanegasaki (1570); Battle of Anegawa (1570); Siege of Hikida Castle (1573); Siege of Ichijōdani Castle (1573)

Asakura Yoshikage (朝倉 義景; October 12, 1533 – September 16, 1573) was a Japanese daimyō of the Sengoku period (1467–1603) who ruled a part of Echizen Province in present-day Fukui Prefecture. He was a regent of Ashikaga Shogunate. Yoshikage's conflicts with Oda Nobunaga (1534–1582) resulted in his death and the destruction of the Asakura clan and its castle, Ichijōdani Castle.

== Early life ==
Yoshikage was born at the Asakura clan castle in Echizen Province, Ichijōdani Castle, in the present-day Kidanouchi district of Fukui, Fukui Prefecture. His father was Asakura Takakage (1493–1548) and his mother is presumed to be the daughter of Takeda Motomitsu. The Asakura had displaced the Shiba clan as the shugo military commanders of part of Echizen in 1471. Yoshikage succeeded his father as head of the Asakura clan and castle lord of Ichijōdani Castle in 1548. He proved to be adept at political and diplomatic management, markedly demonstrated by the Asakura negotiations with the Ikkō-ikki in Echizen at the start of his reign, which would at last put an end to major conflict between both parties. As a result of the negotiations and effective governance by Yoshikage, Echizen enjoyed a period of relative domestic stability compared to the rest of Sengoku period Japan. Consequently, Echizen became a site for refugees fleeing the violence in the Kansai region. Ichijōdani became a center of culture modeled on the capital at Kyōto.

== Conflicts with Oda Nobunaga ==
After the capture of Kyoto in 1568, Ashikaga Yoshiaki appointed Yoshikage as a regent and requested Asakura aid in driving Nobunaga out of the capital. In the mean time, after installing Yoshiaki as Shogun, Nobunaga had evidently pressed Yoshiaki to request all local daimyō to come to Kyoto and attend a certain banquet, but Yoshikage refused. As a result, in 1570, Oda Nobunaga launched an invasion of Echizen. Due to Yoshikage’s lack of military skill, Oda's forces besieged Kanegasaki Castle (in modern-day Tsuruga city), opening the entire Asakura Domain to invasion.

Yoshikage benefited from military conflict between Oda Nobunaga and his brother-in-law, Azai Nagamasa (1545–1573). Later, Azai launched a pincer attack with Asakura against Nobunaga at Kanegasaki, but Nobunaga withdrew his troops, the coalition of Asakura and Azai forces failed to capture Nobunaga.

Later in July 1570, in the Battle of Anegawa, Yoshikage and Nagamasa were defeated by numerically superior combined forces of the Oda and Tokugawa clans led by Nobunaga and Ieyasu (1543–1616). Yoshikage fled to Hiezan (Enryaku-ji, Hiei Monastery) after the Battle of Anegawa and negotiated a reconciliation with Nobunaga and was able to avoid conflict for three years.

== Death ==
In 1573, after Yoshikage fled from the Siege of Hikida Castle, Nobunaga attack Asakura's castle town, and besieged Ichijodani Castle, Yoshikage was eventually betrayed by his cousin, Asakura Kageaki (1529–1574). He was forced to commit suicide by seppuku at Rokubō Kenshō-ji, a temple which was located in present-day Ōno, Fukui Prefecture. He was 39 years old. The Asakura clan was destroyed with the death of Yoshikage.

== Ichijōdani Asakura family historic ruins ==
The former Asakura residence in Fukui Prefecture was excavated in 1967 and revealed the ruins of the castle, residences, and gardens of Ichijōdani. The site has been designated a Special Places of Scenic Beauty, Special Historic Sites, and an Important Cultural Properties of Japan as the Ichijōdani Asakura Family Historic Ruins. The site covers 278 hectares (690 acres).
