= Ichijōdani Asakura Family Historic Ruins =

Historic ruins in Fukui, Japan

- 一乗谷朝倉氏遺跡 (Japanese)
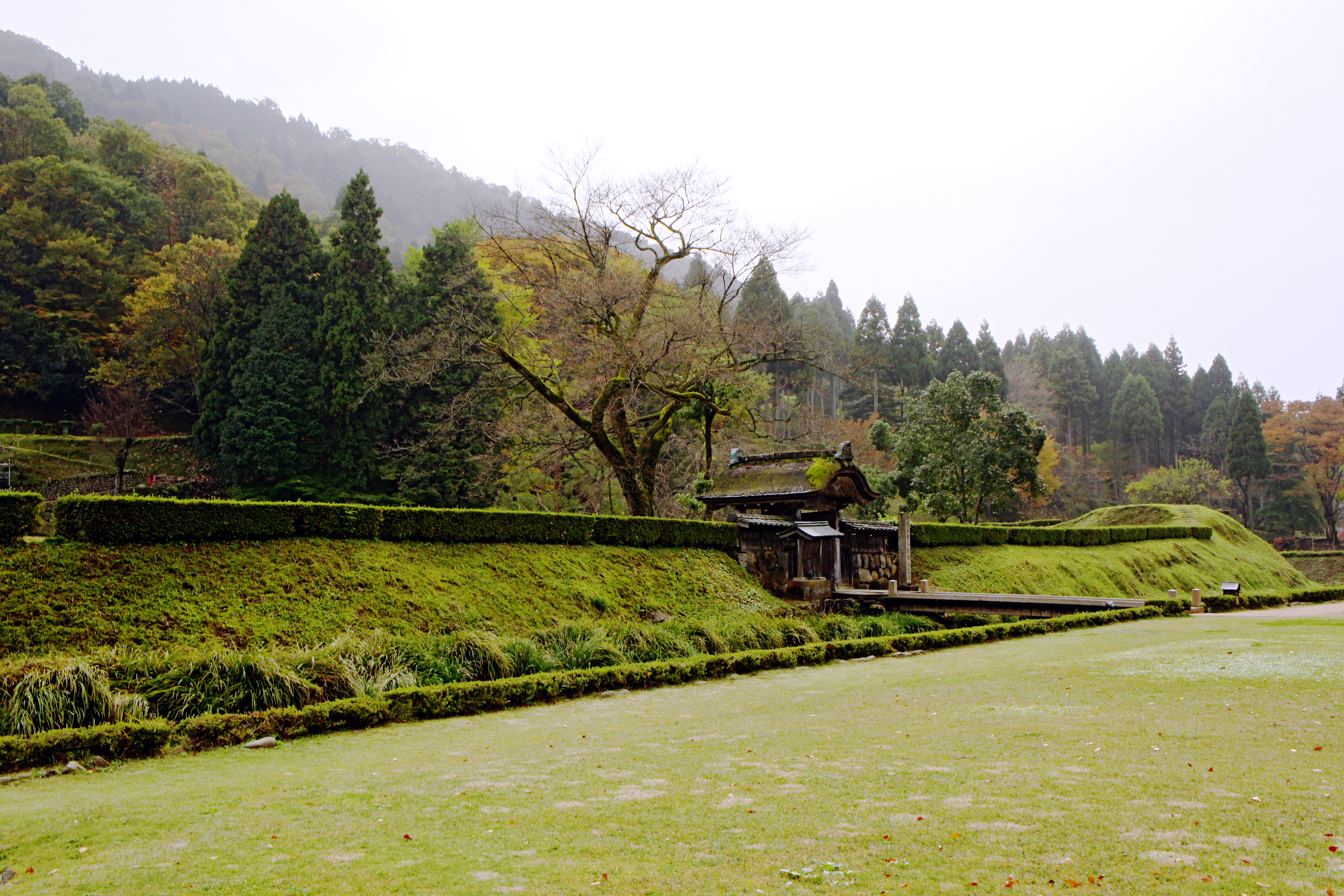
- Asakura Yakata ruins (Asakura Yoshikage`s residence)

- Ichijōdani Asakura Family Historic Ruins Ichijōdani Asakura Family Historic Ruins (Japan)
- 35.999474°N 136.29557°E
- Periods: Muromachi period
- Location: Fukui, Fukui, Japan
- Region: Hokuriku region

History
- Built: 1471
- Abandoned: 1573

Site notes
- Excavation dates: 1967-
- Owner: Special National Historic Site
- Public access: Yes

The Ichijōdani Asakura Family Historic Ruins (一乗谷朝倉氏遺跡, Ichijōdani Asakura-shi Iseki) are historic ruins located in the Kidonouchi section of the city of Fukui, Fukui Prefecture, in the Hokuriku region of Japan. This area was controlled by the Asakura clan for 103 years during the Sengoku period. It was designated as a Special Historic Site in 1971, and in June 2007, 2,343 artifacts were designated as Important Cultural Properties.

== Site ==
Ichijōdani is a valley of a branch of the Asuwa River with an east-west width of approximately 500 meters and a length of approximately three kilometers. The valley is surrounded by mountains on the east, west and south, and by the river to the north, forming a natural fortification.

== History ==
In 1471, Asakura had displaced the Shiba clan as the shugo military commander of Echizen Province. The same year, Asakura Toshikage (1428–1481) fortified the Ichijōdani by constructing hilltop fortifications on the surrounding mountains and constructing walls and gates to seal off the northern and southern end of the valley. Within this area, he contracted a fortified mansion, surrounded by the homes of his relatives and retainers, and eventually by the residences of merchants and artisans, and Buddhist temples. He offered refuge to people of culture or skills from Kyoto attempting to escape the conflict of the Ōnin War, and the Ichijōdani became a major cultural, military, and population center, and by the time of Asakura Takakage (1493–1548) it had a peak population of over 10,000 inhabitants. Yoshikage succeeded his father as head of the Asakura clan and castle lord of Ichijōdani Castle in 1548. The Asakura maintained good relations with the Ashikaga shogunate, and thus eventually came into conflict with Oda Nobunaga. Following Nobunaga's capture of Kyoto, Shōgun Ashikaga Yoshiaki appointed Asakura Yoshikage as regent and requested aid in driving Nobunaga out of the capital. As a result, Nobunaga launched an invasion of Echizen Province. Due to Yoshikage's lack of military skill, Nobunaga's forces were successful at the Siege of Kanegasaki and subsequent Battle of Anegawa in 1570, leaving the entire Asakura Domain open to invasion.

Ichijōdani was razed to the ground by Nobunaga during the 1573 Siege of Ichijōdani Castle.

Excavation of the ruins began in 1967 and continued on in 2017, revealing the shape of the whole town, including the house of the lord, samurai residences, temples, houses of merchants, houses of craft workers, and streets. Residences of samurai as well as merchants' quarters have since been restored along the 200 meter long street. Four Japanese gardens were unearthed and partially restored, and those were designated as Places of Scenic Beauty in 1991. The ruins of Ichijōdani Castle (一乗谷城) are on top of a nearby hill, with a scenic view of Fukui.

Approximately 1,700,000 relics were found at the ruins, and of these 2,343 are nationally designated as Important Cultural Properties, many of which are on display at the Ichijodani Asakura Family Site Museum.

== Cultural properties ==
Designated in the following categories:

- Special Places of Scenic Beauty — The Gardens, including Nanyōji-ato Garden of a temple and those of residences (Suwa Yakata-ato, Asakura Yakata-ato, and Yudono-ato)
- Special Historic Sites — The whole site (278 hectares)
- Important Cultural Properties — 2,343 pieces from among excavated artifacts
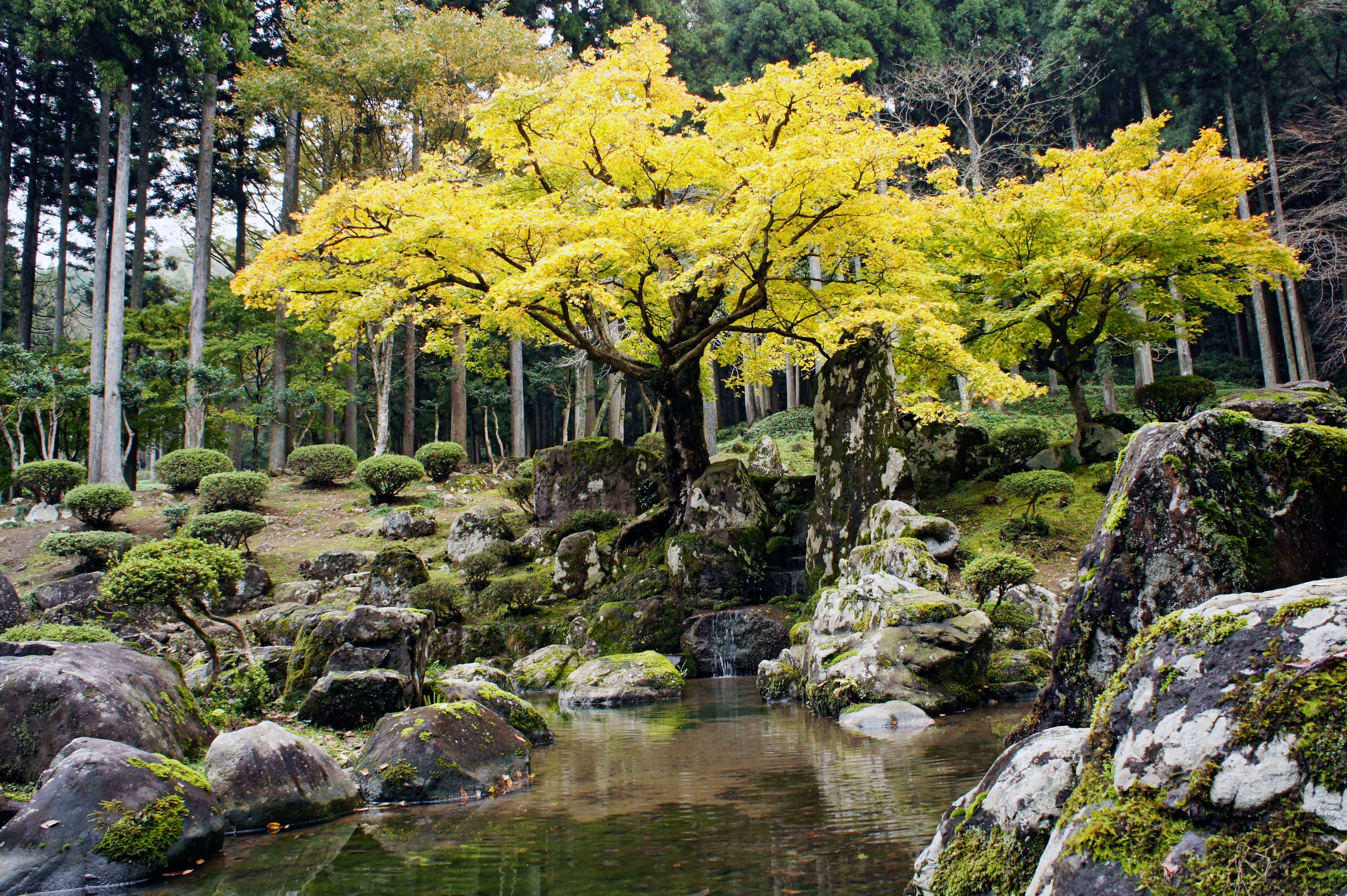
Suwa Yakata-ato Garden

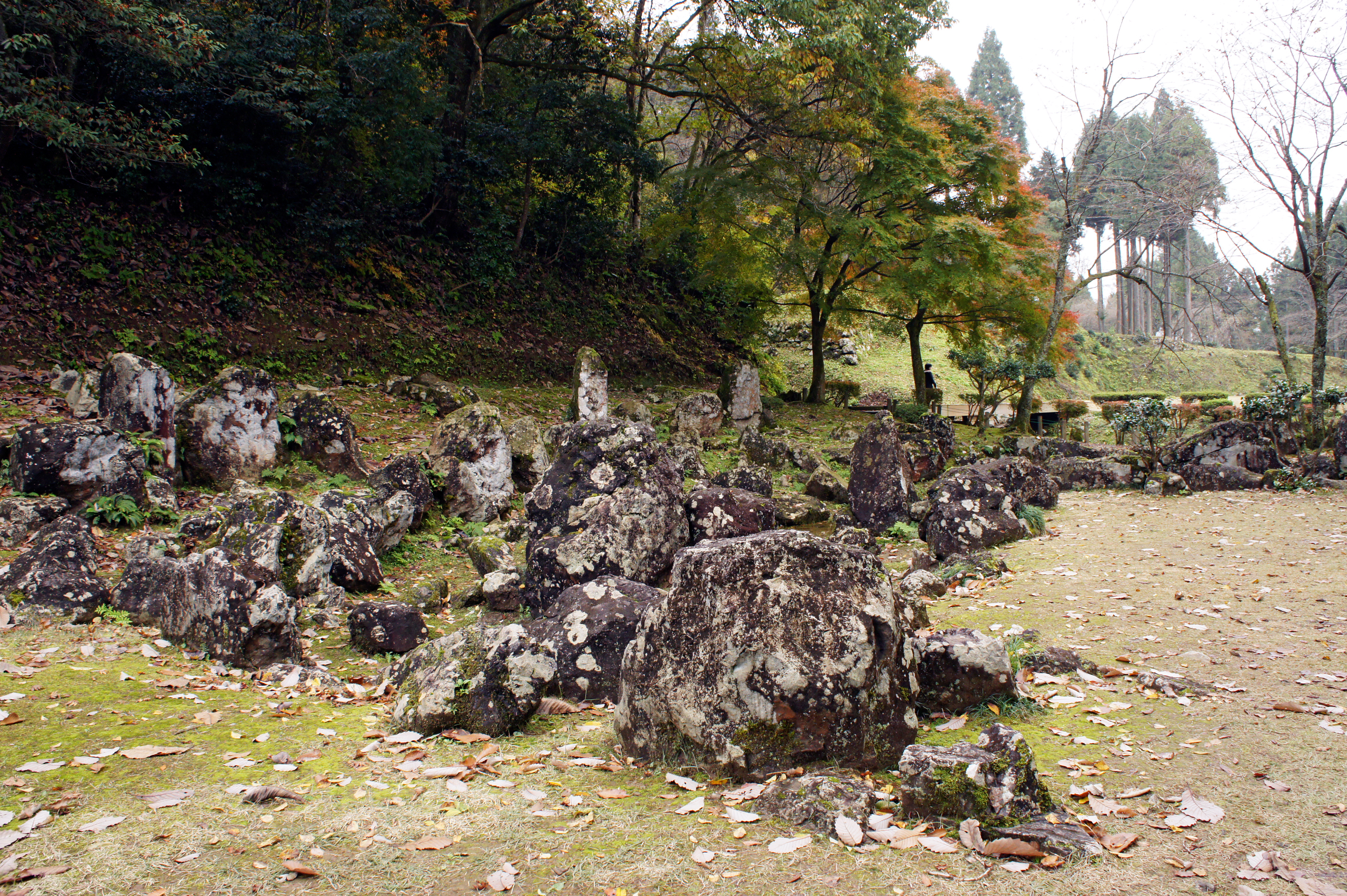
Yudono-ato Garden

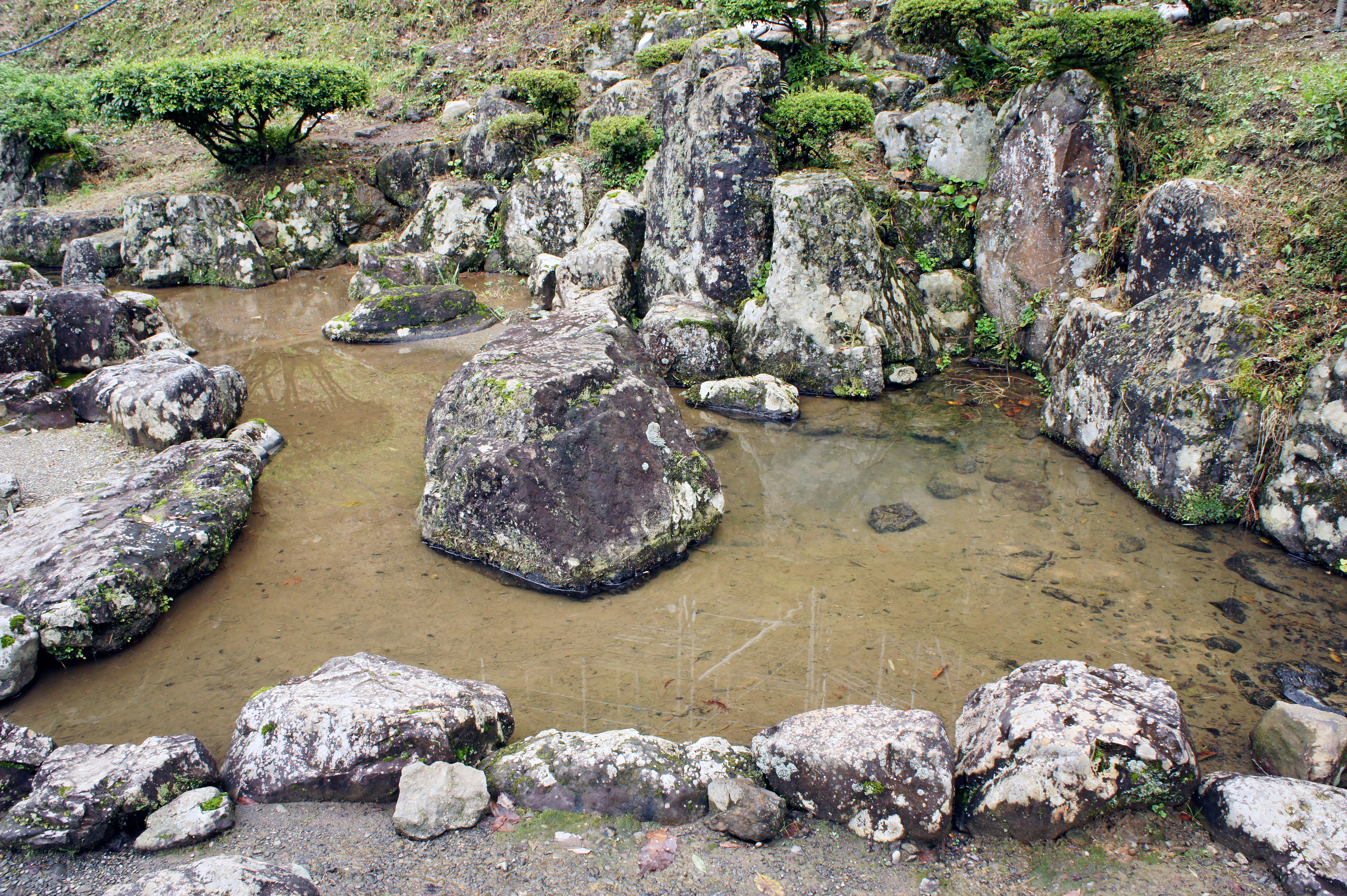
Asakura Yakata-ato Garden

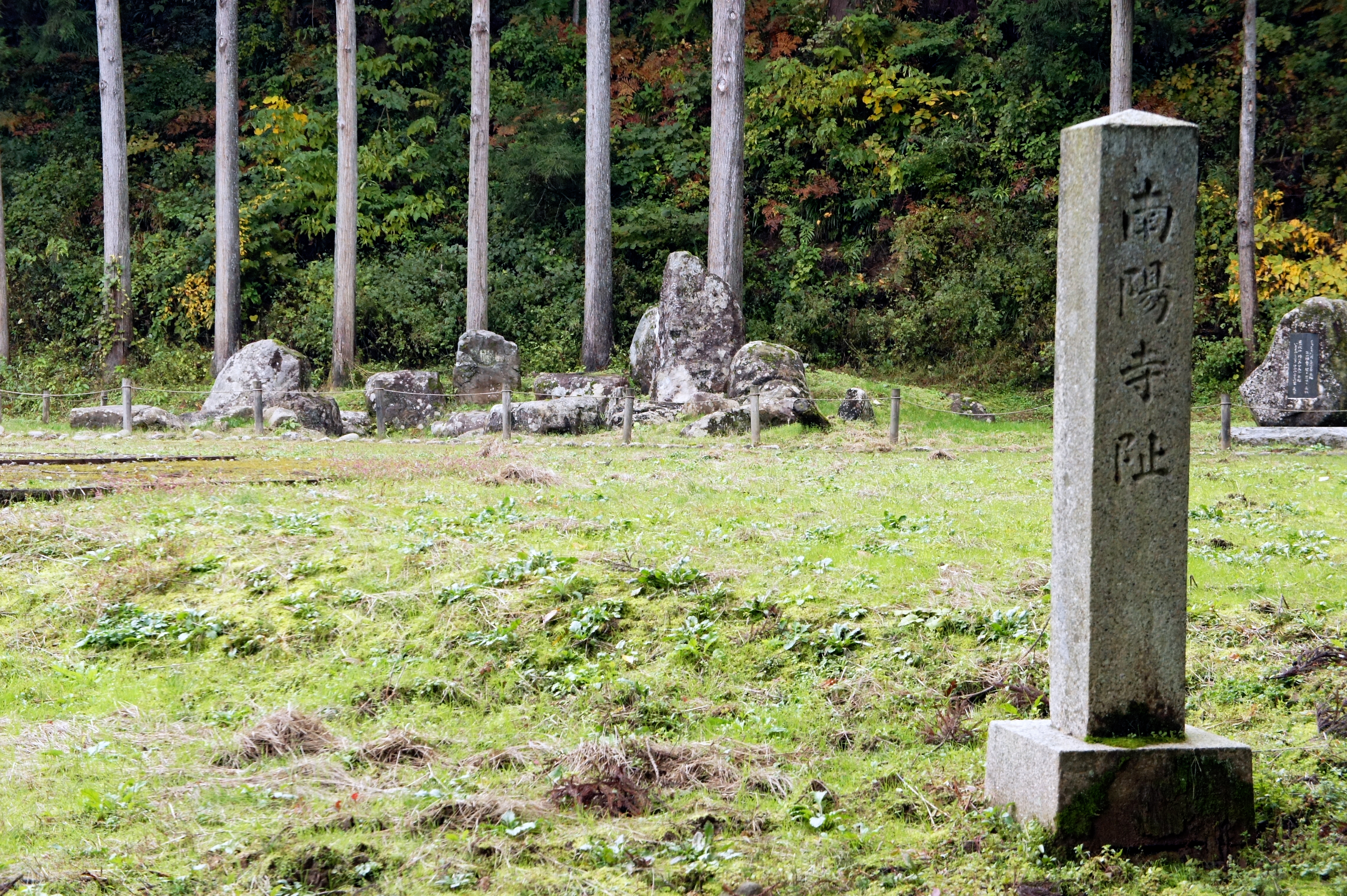
Nanyōji-ato Garden

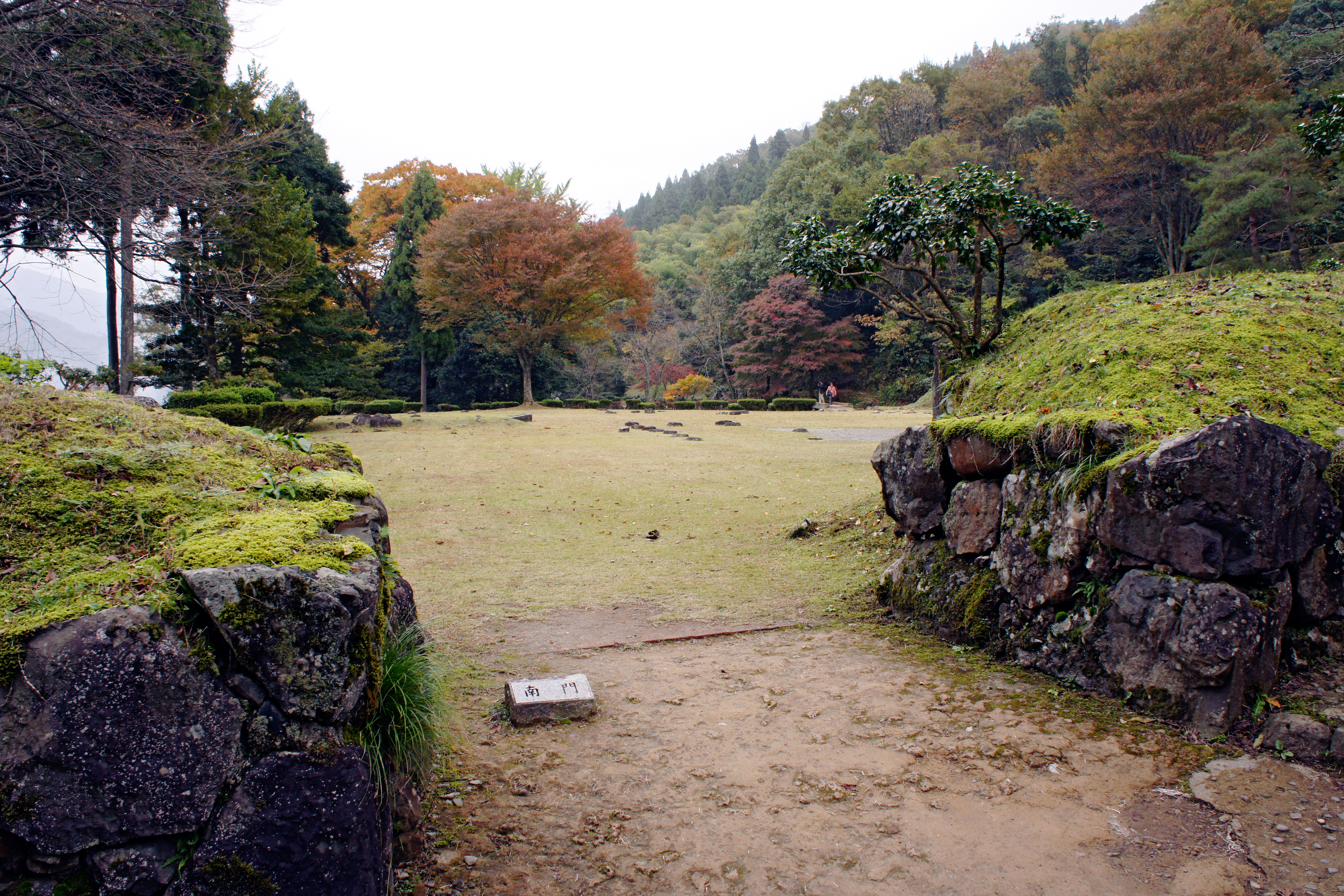
Stone wall of Nakanogoten gate

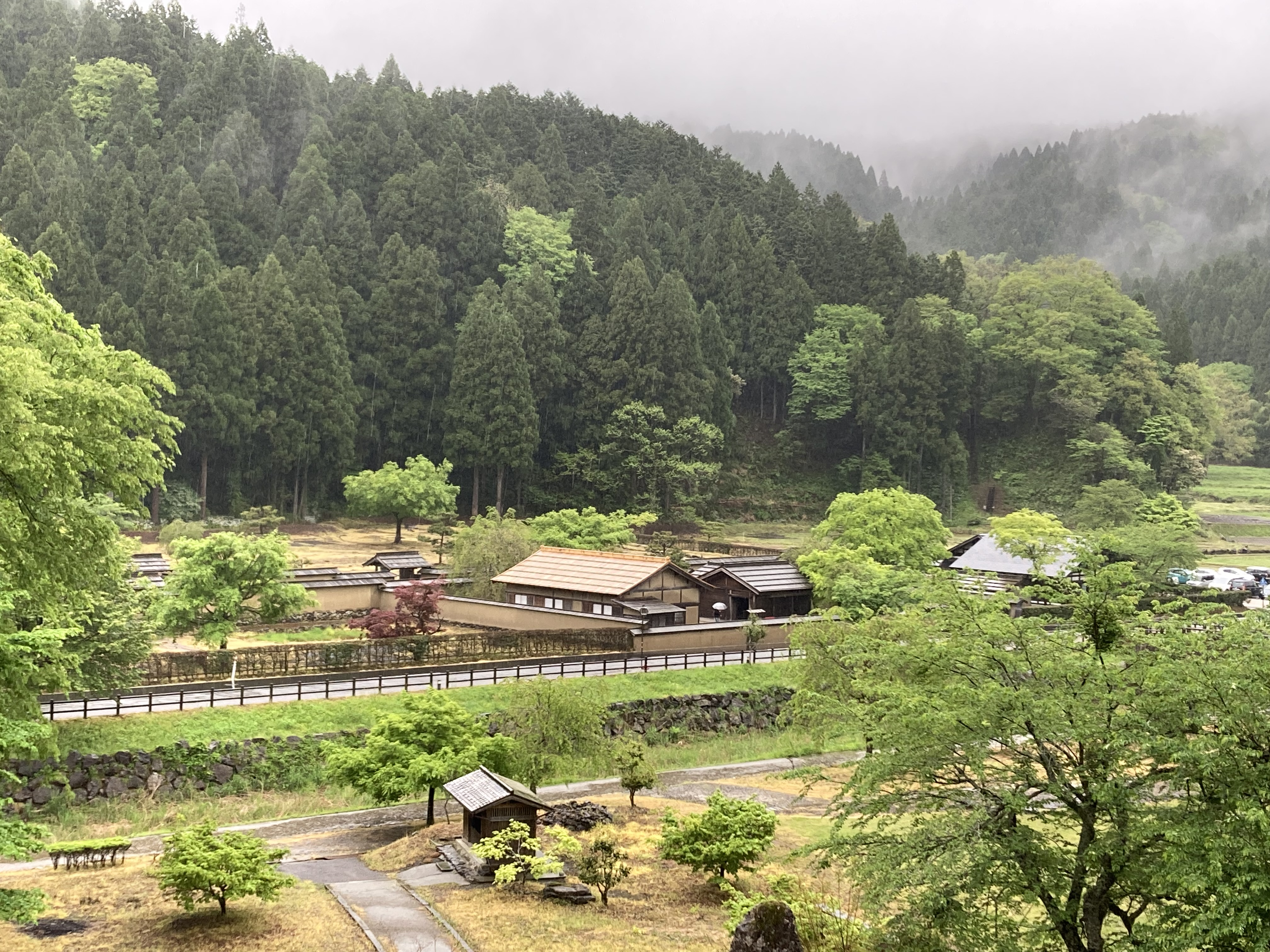
Distant view of restored town of Ichijodani

== Access ==
- Take JR Etsumi-Hoku Line from Fukui Station and get off at Ichijōdani Station. The lower gate is about 5 min walk from the station and the center of village is about 30 min. Free shuttle bus Asakura-Yumemaru from Ichijodani Asakura Family Site Museum is also available on weekends to reach the directly to the center of village.

== See also ==
- Fukui Prefectural Ichijodani Asakura Family Site Museum
- List of Special Places of Scenic Beauty, Special Historic Sites and Special Natural Monuments
- Tourism in Japan

== Literature ==
- De Lange, William (2021). An Encyclopedia of Japanese Castles. Groningen: Toyo Press. pp. 600 pages. ISBN 978-9492722300.
- Pitelka, Morgan (2023). Reading Medieval Ruins New Edition. Cambridge: Cambridge University Press. pp. 256. ISBN 978-1009069977.
