= Siege of Kanegasaki (1570) =

1570 siege

- Part of the Sengoku period
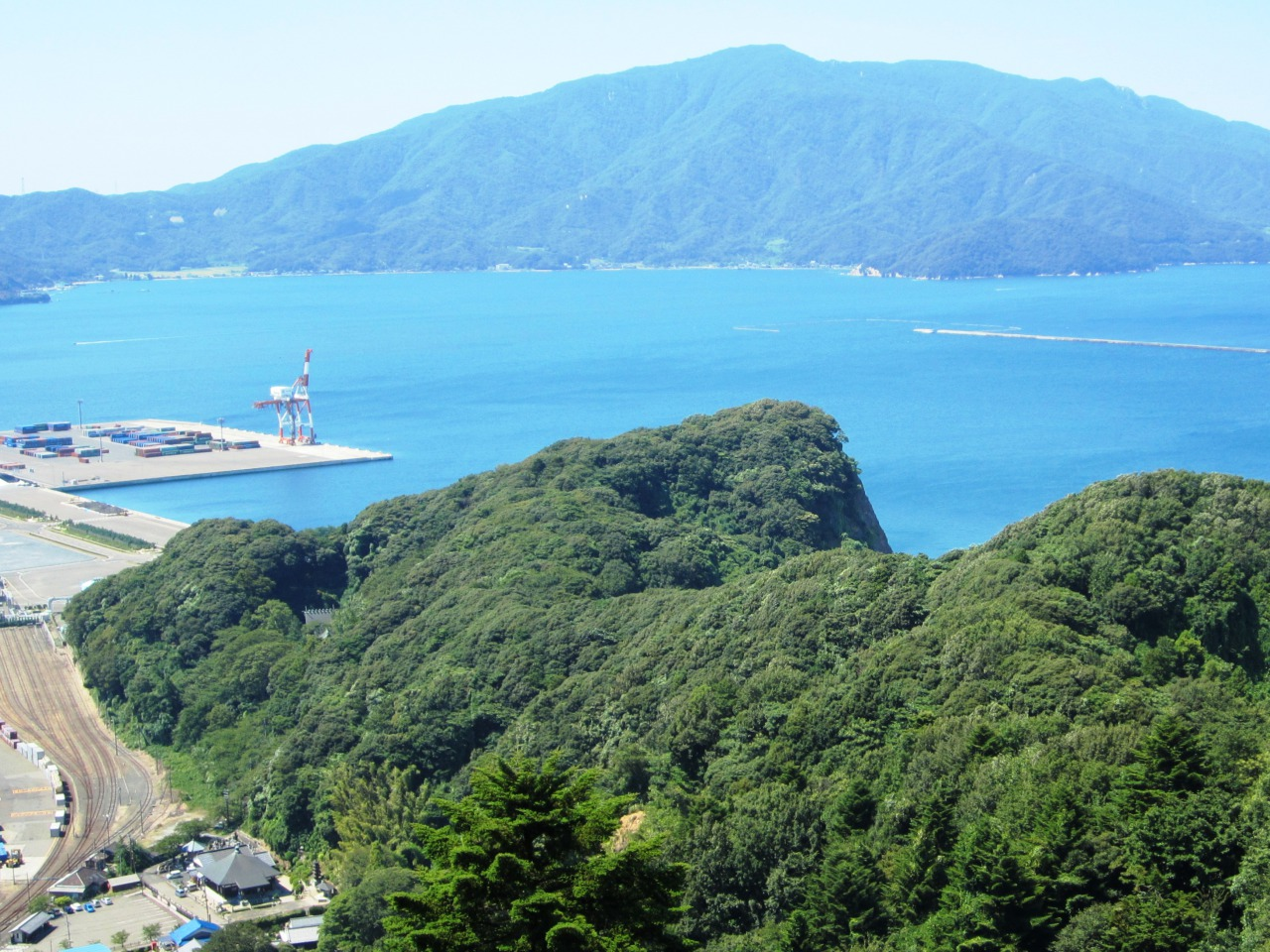
- The site of Kanegasaki Castle, seen from Tezutsu-yama in Tsuruga
| Date | 1570 |
| Location | Kanegasaki Castle, Tsuruga, Echizen Province |
| Result | Nobunaga withdraws his forces: Successful retreat by Nobunaga |

Belligerents
| Oda clan forces Tokugawa clan forces | Asakura clan forces Azai clan forces Rokkaku clan forces Ikkō-ikki forces |

Commanders and leaders
| Oda Nobunaga; Tokugawa Ieyasu; Hashiba Hideyoshi; Sassa Narimasa; Maeda Toshiie; Ikeda Katsumasa; Akechi Mitsuhide | Castle garrison: Maeba Yoshitsugu; Relief forces: Asakura Kagetake; Azai Nagamasa; Rokkaku Yoshikata |

Strength
| 30,000 | 24,500 |

The 1570 siege of Kanegasaki (金ヶ崎の戦い, Kanegasaki no Tatakai) took place during Oda Nobunaga's conflict with the Asakura clan in Echizen Province, which was allied with Azai Nagamasa.

== Background ==
Asakura Yoshikage, the head of the Asakura clan and regent to Ashikaga Yoshiaki, refused Nobunaga's invitation to a court banquet in Kyoto. Nobunaga interpreted this as disloyalty to both the shogun and the emperor, prompting him to raise an army and march on Echizen.

Several reports from Mikawa Monogatari, Nobunaga Koki, Tokugawa Jikki, and a supplement from Ietada Nikki documented that Tokugawa Ieyasu and his forces also participated in this campaign. They captured Mount Tenzutsu castle on April 25, killing 1,370 enemies in the process.

== Siege ==
The next day, Nobunaga's forces besieged Kanegasaki Castle, which was held by Maeba Yoshitsugu. One of Nobunaga's chief generals, Kinoshita Tōkichirō (later Hashiba Hideyoshi then Toyotomi Hideyoshi), led the attack, with Sassa Narimasa commanding a contingent of horse guards and firearms troops to support him.

Meanwhile, Azai Nagamasa led an army to relieve Kanegasaki Castle. Realizing that he was surrounded by Asakura and Azai forces, Nobunaga retreated from Kanegasaki. Ikeda Katsumasa led 3,000 soldiers to aid in his escape, while Akechi Mitsuhide and Tōkichirō served as the rear guard. This marked Nagamasa's betrayal of the Oda clan.

Nobunaga retreated without informing Ieyasu. After dawn, Ieyasu was guided by Kinoshita Tōkichirō to withdraw from the battle.

== Aftermath ==
The fighting retreat at Kanegasaki enabled Oda Nobunaga to once again escape death. He later gathered an army that would secure victory against the Azai-Asakura forces at the Battle of Anegawa. Kinoshita Tōkichirō's role in defending his lord during the retreat became one of his legendary achievements under Nobunaga.

== See also ==
- Siege of Kanegasaki (1337)
