= Asakura clan =

Japanese clan

Asakura 朝倉
- The Asakura clan mon
- Home province: Echizen
- Parent house: Kusakabe clan (purported)
- Titles: Various
- Final ruler: Asakura Yoshikage
- Founding year: 662–689; 1337 years ago
- Dissolution: 1573; 453 years ago
- Ruled until: 1573 (for 911 years), Asakura Yoshikage commits seppuku

The Asakura clan (朝倉氏, Asakura-shi) is a Japanese samurai kin group.

== History ==
The clan claims descent from Prince Kusakabe (662–689), who was the son of Emperor Tenmu (631–686). The family was a line of daimyō (feudal lords) who, along with the Azai clan, opposed Oda Nobunaga in the late 16th century. Nobunaga defeated the Asakura at the Battle of Anegawa in 1570; the family's home castle of Ichijōdani was taken in 1573. Asakura Nobumasa (1583–1637), nephew of Asakura Yoshikage, was allied with Toyotomi Hideyoshi and with Tokugawa Ieyasu. In 1625, he was granted the Kakegawa Domain (25,000 koku) in Tōtōmi Province. In 1632, he was implicated in a plot, causing him to be dispossessed and banished to Koriyama, where he died.

== Clan Heads ==
- Asakura Toshikage (1428–1481)
- Asakura Ujikage (1449–1486)
- Asakura Sadakage (1473–1512)
- Asakura Takakage (1493–1546)
- Asakura Yoshikage (1533–1573)

== Retainer ==
- Asakura Norikage (1477–1555)
- Asakura Kageaki (1529–1574)
- Asakura Kagetake (1536–1575)
- Asakura Kagetsura (d.1570)
- Asakura Nobumasa (1583–1637)
- Maeba Yoshitsugu (1524–1574)
