= Kannonshō-ji =

Buddhist temple in Ōmihachiman, Shiga, Japan

- 観音正寺
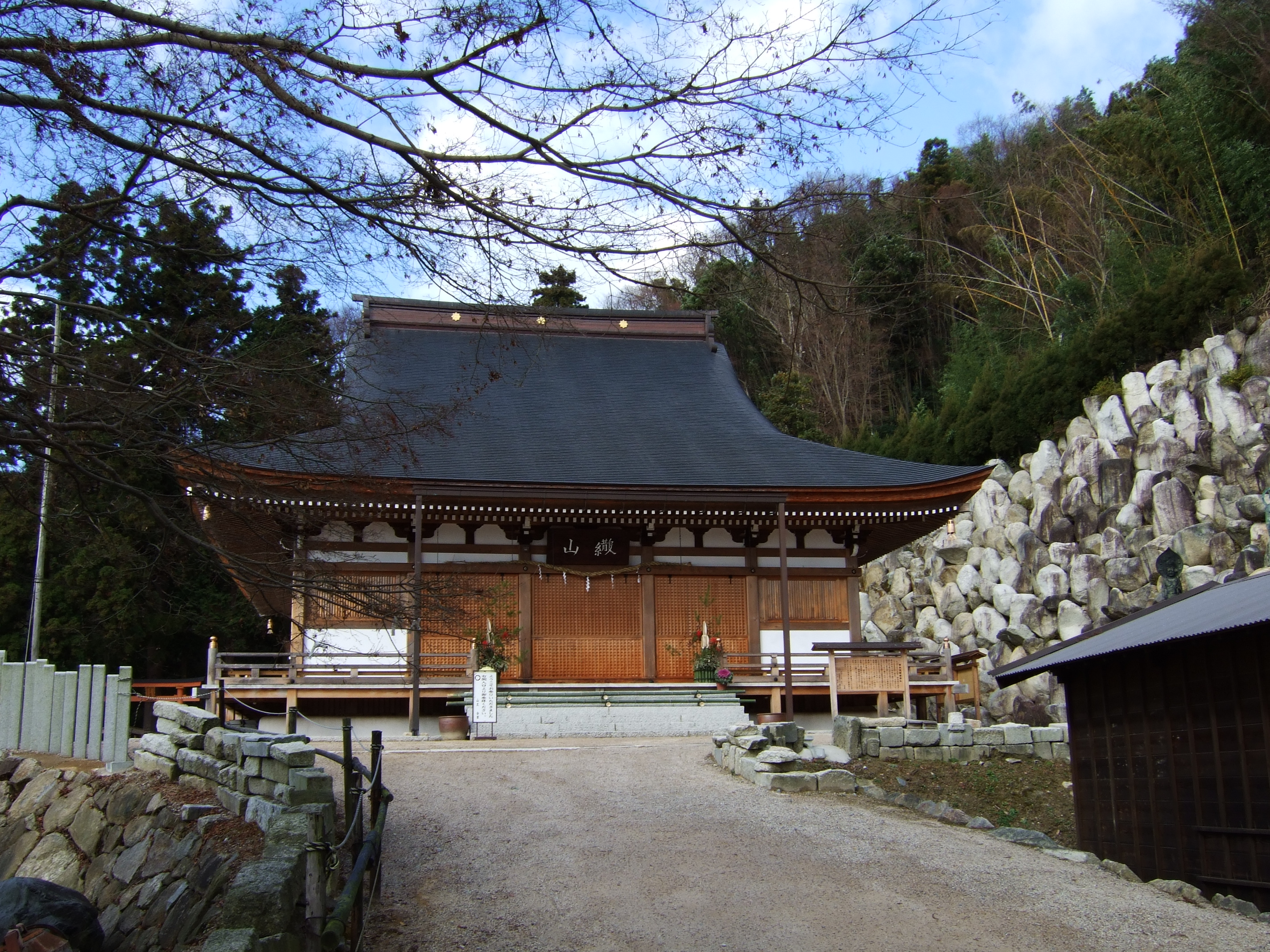
- Hondo

- Location within Shiga Prefecture Location within Japan

Religion
- Affiliation: Buddhist
- Deity: Senjū Kannon Bosatsu (Sahasrabhuja)
- Rite: Tendai
- Status: functional

Location
- Location: 2 Ishidera, Azuchi-chō, Ōmihachiman-shi, Shiga-ken 521-1331
- Country: Japan
- Interactive map of Kannonshō-ji
- Coordinates: 35°8′40.8″N 136°9′39.7″E

Architecture
- Founder: c.Prince Shōtoku
- Completed: c.605

Website
- Official website

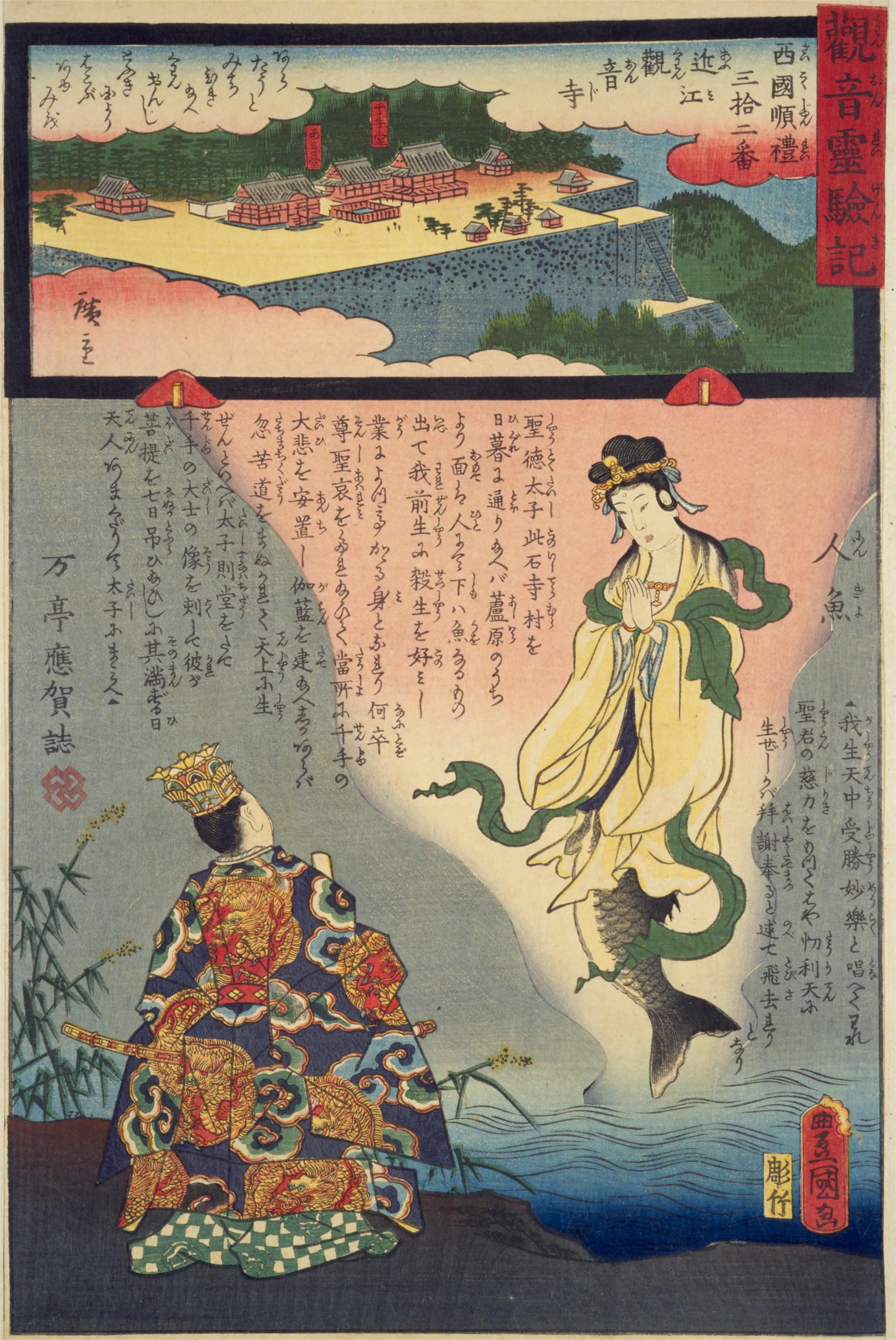
Prince Shōtoku and the mermaid from “Saikoku junrei 32 ban Ōmi Kannonji / Ningyo”, in Kan'on reigenki

Kannonshō-ji (観音正寺) is a Buddhist temple located in the Azuchi neighborhood of the city of Ōmihachiman, Shiga Prefecture, Japan. It belongs to the Tendai sect of Japanese Buddhism and its honzon is a statue of Senjū Kannon Bosatsu (Sahasrabhuja). The temple's full name is Kinugasa-san Kannonshō-ji (繖山 観音正寺).The temple is the 31st stop on the Saigoku Kannon Pilgrimage route. It is located on the eastern shore of Lake Biwa, at an elevation of about 370 meters on the south side of the summit of Mount Kinugasayama, which is 433 meters above sea level. It is located on the site of Kannonji Castle, which is a National Historic Site.

== History ==
=== Founding legends ===
According to legend, the temple was founded in the 13th year of the reign of Empress Suiko (605), when Prince Shōtoku visited the area and enshrined a Senjū Kannon statue he had carved himself. There are two versions of this story.

One version is that when Prince Shōtoku visited Kanzaki County, a mermaid appeared in the reed-filled waters. She told him that in her previous life she had been a fisherman from Katata, a village on the shores of Lake Biwa, but that she had reincarnated as a mermaid and was suffering as a result of her repeated taking of life. She pleaded for a statue of Senjū Kannon to be placed in a temple hall so that her soul could be saved. Prince Shōtoku accepted this request and built the temple, carving a Senjū Kannon statue himself as the principal image. The "Illustrated Guide to the Thirty-Three Kannon Temples of the Western Provinces," (西国三十三所観音霊場記図絵) tells that the mermaid later attained enlightenment (attained Buddhahood) and that her body, floating near the shore, was reported to Prince Shōtoku in a dream, where it was then retrieved and placed at the temple. The temple once housed what was said to be a mummy of the mermaid, but the mummy was destroyed in a fire in 1993.

The second version of this legend is that when Prince Shōtoku visited the area, he saw a heavenly being dancing on a huge rock on Mount Kinugasa. He carved five Buddha figures on the rock, including an image of Myōken Bodhisattva. Next, Prince Shōtoku, guided by Amaterasu and Kasuga Myōjin, ground ink with spring water from the mountain and painted a Senjū Kannon. Shaka Nyorai and Dainichi Nyorai then appeared and instructed him to carve a Senjū Kannon statue out of sacred wood. Prince Shōtoku then carved the Senjū Kannon statue from sacred wood and built the temple, using the rock as its inner sanctuary.

=== Historical record ===
While the exact date of the temple's founding is unknown, it must have existed at least as early as the 11th century during the Heian period. In 1333, when the Rokuhara Tandai, Hōjō Nakatoki, was attacked by Ashikaga Takauji, he attempted to flee to eastern Japan with Emperor Kōgon, the Retired Emperor Go-Fushimi, and the Retired Emperor Hanazono. During this escape attempt, the temple was used as lodging for the emperor and the two retired emperors.

The temple is located on Mount Kinugasa, where Kannonji Castle was once the stronghold of the Rokkaku clan, who ruled the southern half of Ōmi Province since the Kamakura period. The temple initially prospered under the protection of the Rokkaku. However, during the Eiroku era (1558-1570) Rokkaku Yoshikata greatly expanded Kannonji Castle, appropriating most of the temple grounds on the mountain, and forcing the temple to rebuild at the foot of the mountain. The reconstruction was just completed when the Rokkaku were defeated by Oda Nobunaga at the Battle of Kannonji Castle on September 12, 1568 and the new temple buildings were burned down during the battle.

In 1597, now that Kannonji Castle was in ruins, the temple decided to rebuild on its original location near the summit. In 1606, the main hall was rebuilt where the current monk's quarters now stands.

During the Edo period, the temple flourished as one of the Saigoku Kannon Pilgrimage stops. In 1880, the main hall was rebuilt, but the original was dismantled and relocated to Nenshō-ji in the town of Kōra, Shiga.

In 1882, the temple acquired the Zelkova Palace, a structure of Hikone Castle, which became the new main hall. However, in 1993, this building was destroyed by fire. The temple's location in the mountains made it difficult to extinguish the fire, and the principal image of the temple, a standing Senjū Kannon statue with an inscription dated 1497 which had been designated as a National Important Cultural Property, as well as what the temple claimed to be a "mermaid mummy" were also destroyed. The current wooden main hall, built in the irimoya-style, was built in 2004.

== Principal image ==
The principal image, a seated Senjū Kannon statue, was completed in 2004 by Buddhist sculptor Myōkei Matsumoto.

While the previous principal image was a standing statue less than one meter tall, this new statue ist 3.56 meters tall, with a total height of 6.3 meters including the halo. The new statue is made of 23 tons of sandalwood imported from India. Sandalwood was previously prohibited for export, but the temple's chief priest visited India more than 20 times and, after repeated negotiations, was granted special permission to export it to Japan.

The original main image, which survived the fire unscathed, was designated a hibutsu secret Buddha which was opened to the public in 2022. It is scheduled to be opened to the public every 33 years thereafter.

== Images of the temple ==
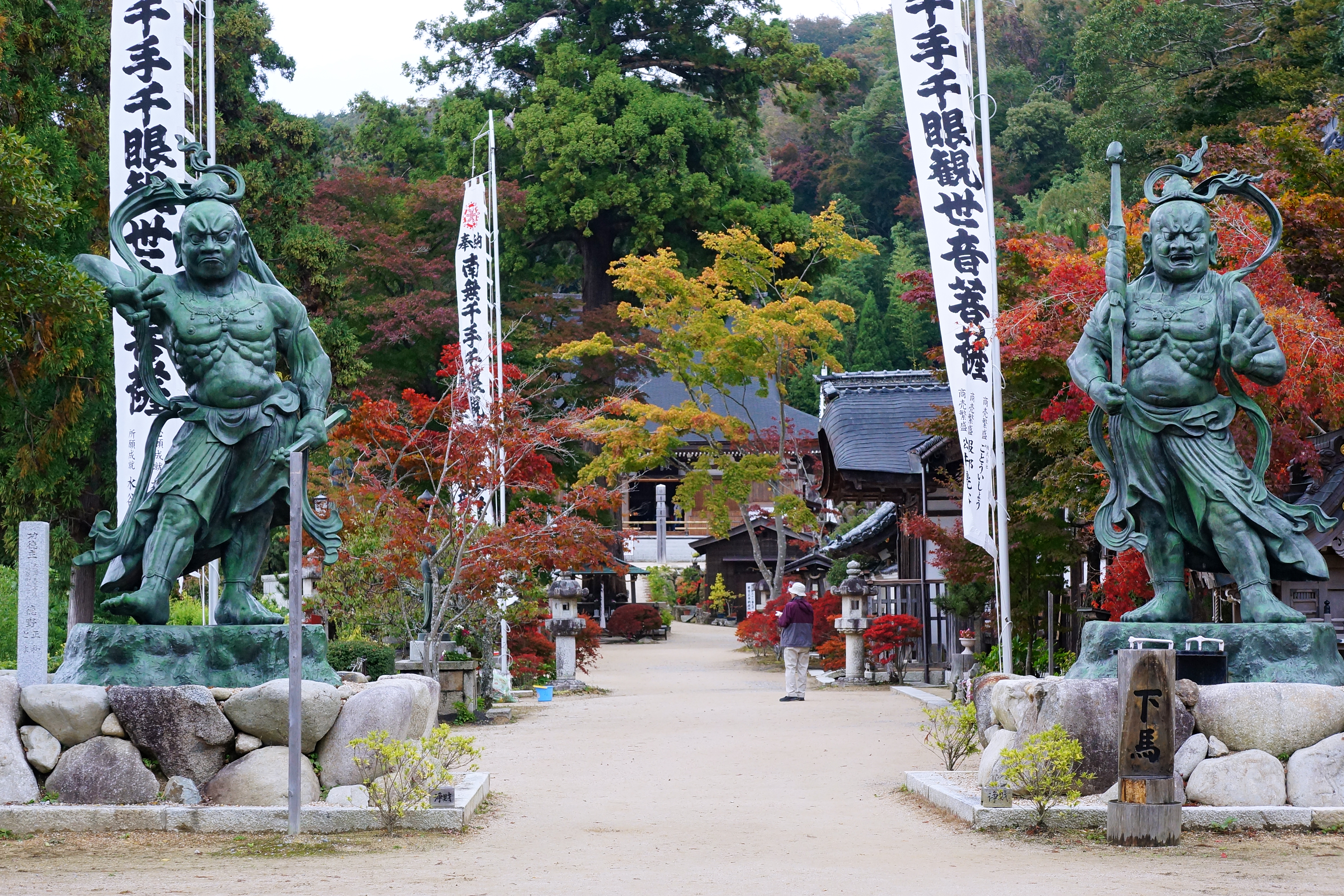
Niō statues

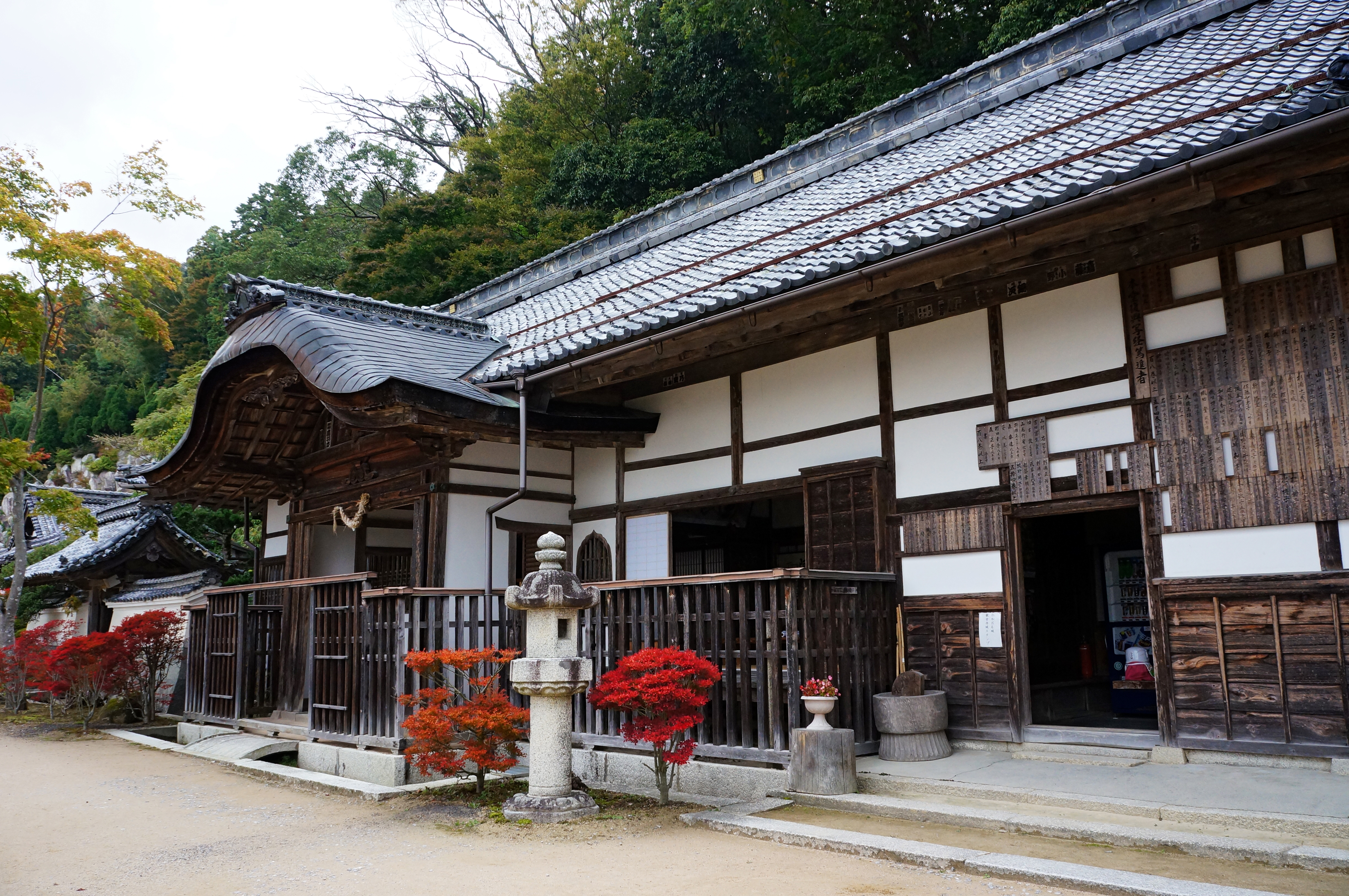
Shoin

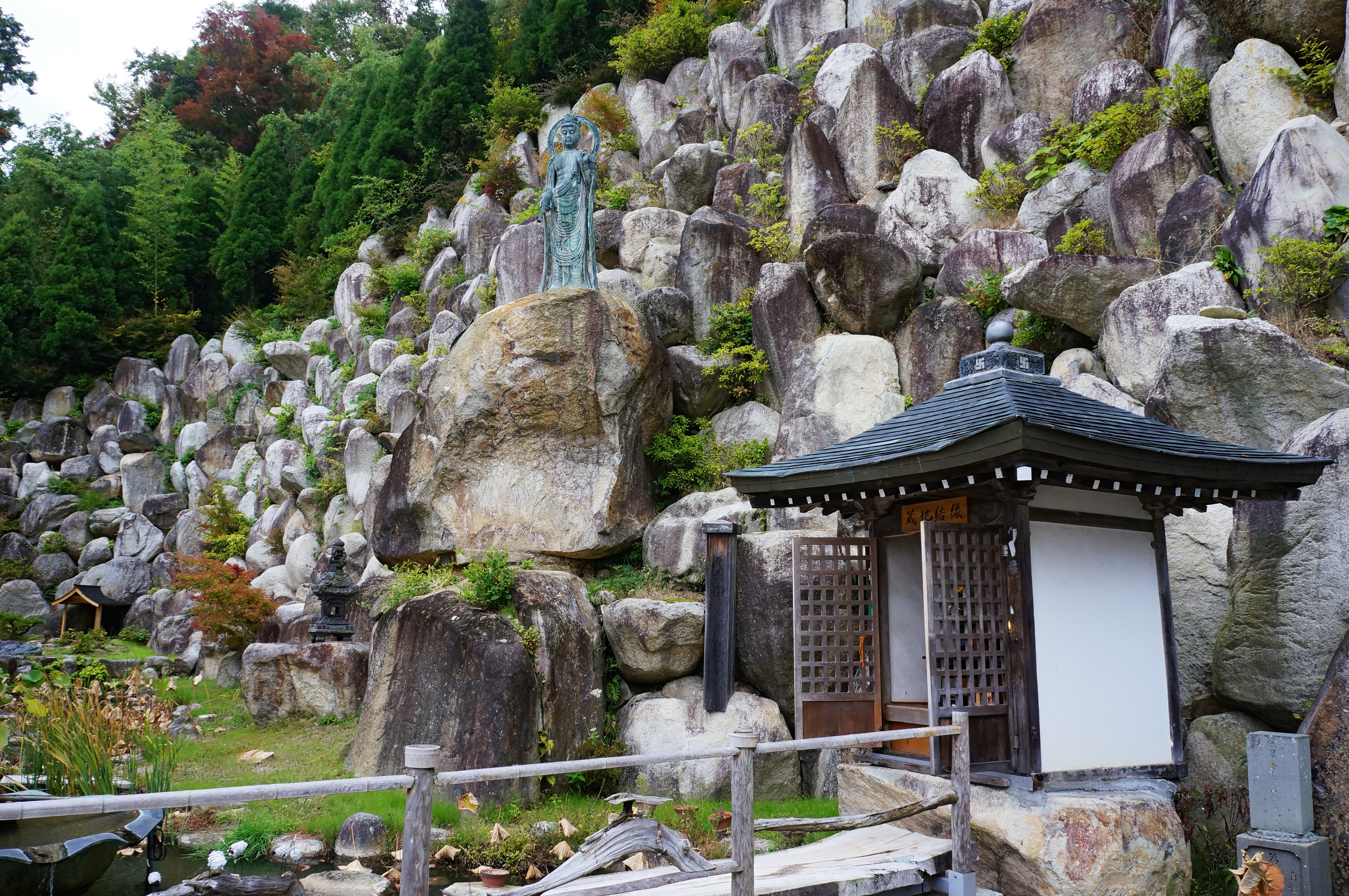
Jizō Bosatsu

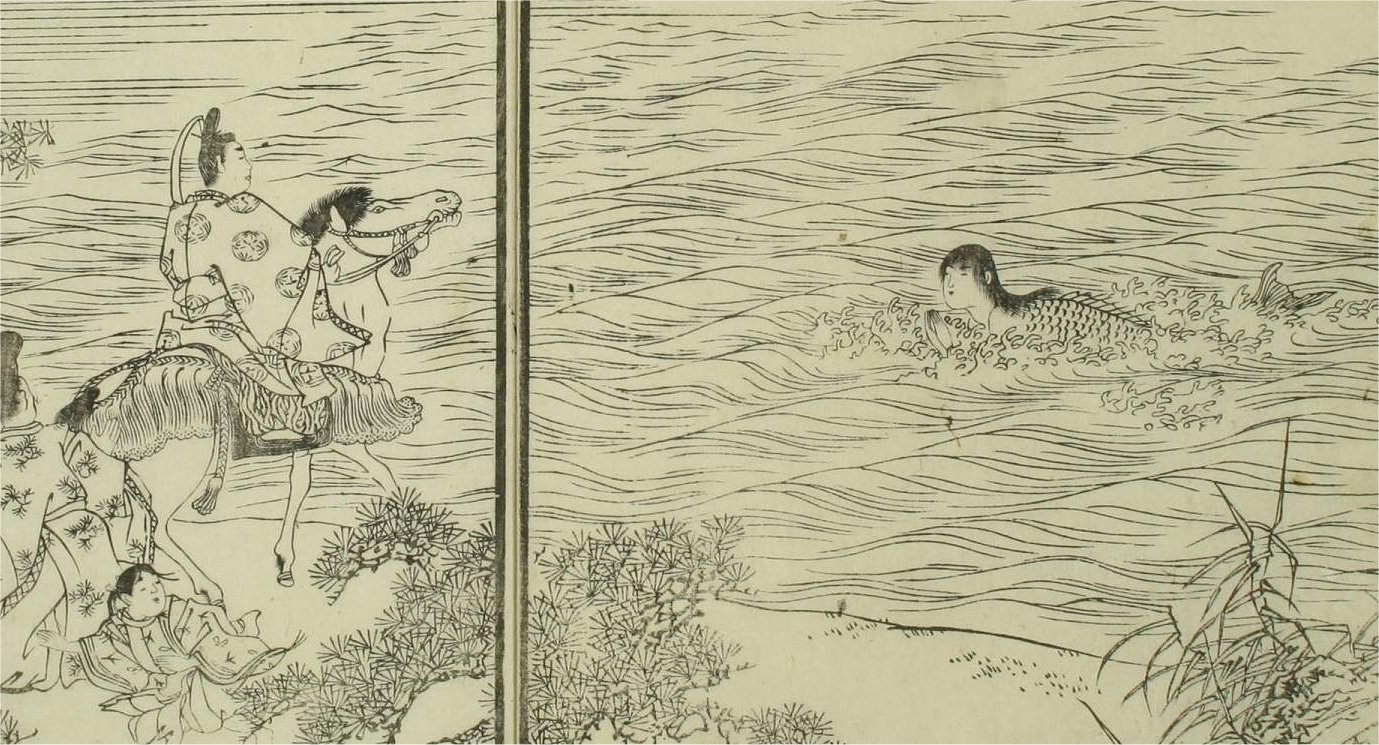
Prince Shōtoku and the mermaid ("Illustrated Guide to the Thirty-Three Kannon Temples of the Western Provinces")

== Access ==
The temple is located approximately 10 kilometers by car from Azuchi Station on the JR West Biwako Line.

== Cultural Properties ==
=== National Registered Tangible Cultural Properties ===
- Shoin (書院[), Edo period (1796).
- Shoin garden gate (書院庭門), Edo period (1844). The opens onto the west side of the earthen wall that surrounds the garden to the north of the Shoin. It is a one-bay, one-door Yakuimon gate with a gabled roof covered with shingled tiles and a single rafter. Both the main pillars and supporting pillars are square, and a double-swing wooden door hangs across the frontage.
- Jizō-dō (地蔵堂), Meiji period (1881).
- Goma-dō (護摩堂), Shōwa period (1928)
- Fuda-dō (札堂). Shōwa period (1928).
- Shōrō (鐘堂), Shōwa period (1928)
- Chozuya (手水舎), Shōwa period (1928).
