= Siege of Chōkō-ji =

1570 siege

Siege of Chōkōji
- Part of the Sengoku period
Date	1570
Location	Chōkōji Castle, Ōmi Province 35.1056°N 136.1319°E
Result	Oda victory; Siege lifted.

Belligerents
Forces of Rokkaku clan	Forces of Oda clan

Commanders and leaders
Rokkaku Yoshisuke	Shibata Katsuie; Sakuma Nobumori

Strength
4,000 men	Castle Garrison

Chōkō-ji (長興寺) was a temple captured by Oda Nobunaga from the Rokkaku clan in 1568. The Rokkaku tried to take it back in 1570 by cutting off the water supply and placing it under siege.

Shibata Katsuie, the commander entrusted with defending the temple, led his forces in sallying out of the temple to face the besiegers, succeeding in the end. This action, along with a series of brilliant victories, gained him renown as the "Oni Shibata", or "Devil Shibata".
