= Rokkaku Yoshisuke =

Rokkaku Yoshisuke (六角 義介; died 1612) or Yoshiharu, was the son of Rokkaku Yoshikata; and, after 1562, he took responsibility for administration in his father's Namazue domain in Japan's Ōmi Province.

During the Sengoku period, Japan's social and legal culture evolved in ways unrelated to the well-known history of serial battles and armed skirmishes. A number of forward-looking daimyōs independently promulgated codes of conduct to be applied within a specific han or domain. Few examples of these daimyō-made law codes have survived, but the legal framework contrived by the Rokkaku clan remains amongst the small number of documents which can still be studied. In 1567, the Rokkaku-shi shikimoku is promulgated.

In 1570, he fought in the failed Siege of Chōkō-ji. Then in 1572, Namazue was besieged and defeated by the forces of Oda Nobunaga, led by Shibata Katsuie.

The series of defeats in the late 1560s and early 1570s signaled the end of the Rokkaku clan's independence. The Rokkaku became vassals of Oda Nobunaga.

Yoshisuke later served one of Nobunaga's former generals, Tokugawa Ieyasu. During the Edo period, his descendants were ranked amongst the kōke.
