= Kikuchi Dairoku =

Japanese mathematician (1855–1917)

Baron Kikuchi Dairoku
- 菊池 大麓
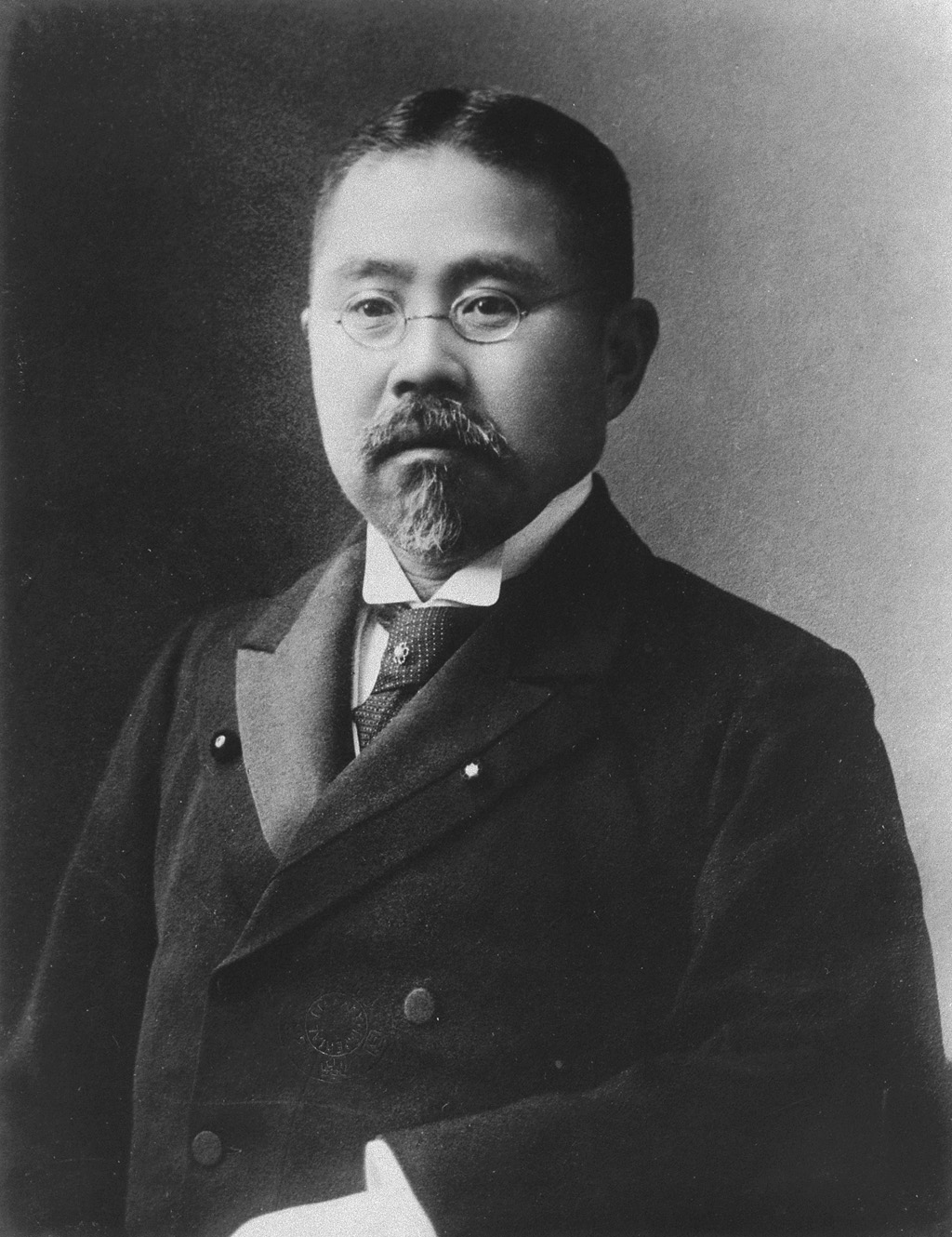

Minister of Education
- In office 2 June 1901 – 17 July 1903
- Prime Minister: Katsura Tarō
- Preceded by: Matsuda Masahisa
- Succeeded by: Kodama Gentarō

Member of the Privy Council
- In office 8 May 1912 – 19 August 1917
- Monarchs: Meiji; Taishō

Member of the House of Peers
- In office 29 September 1890 – 15 May 1912 Nominated by the Emperor

Personal details
- Born: 17 March 1855 Edo, Musashi, Japan
- Died: 19 August 1917 (aged 62) Chigasaki, Kanagawa, Japan
- Relatives: Ryokichi Minobe (grandson); Tatsukichi Minobe (son-in-law)
- Scientific career
- Education: St John's College, Cambridge
- Fields: Mathematics

Signature
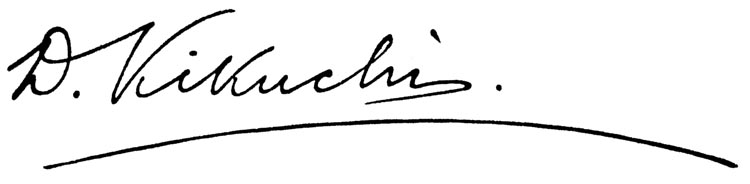

Baron Kikuchi Dairoku (菊池 大麓; 17 March 1855 – 19 August 1917) was a Japanese mathematician, educator, and education administrator during the Meiji era. After earning degrees in mathematics and physics from St John's College at the University of Cambridge, he became one of the first Japanese professors of mathematics at the University of Tokyo. Later in his life, he served as president of the University of Tokyo, Kyoto University, Gakushuin, and the Riken Institute.

== Early life and family ==
Kikuchi was born in Edo (present-day Tokyo), as the second son of Mitsukuri Shūhei, a professor at Bansho Shirabesho, himself the adopted son of Mitsukuri Gempo, a Shogunate professor. The Mitsukuri family had distinguished themselves as scholars, and were at the centre of Japan's educational system in the Meiji era. His grandfather had been a student of Dutch studies ("rangaku").

Kikuchi Dairoku changed his surname from Mitsukuri to Kikuchi upon succeeding as the heir to his father's original family; the requisite legal procedures were completed in 1877.

== Education ==
After attending the Bansho Shirabesho, the Shogunal institute for western studies, he was sent to Great Britain, in 1866, at age 11, the youngest of a group of Japanese sent by the Tokugawa shogunate to the University College School, on the advice of the then British foreign minister Edward Stanley, 15th Earl of Derby.

Kikuchi returned to England in 1870 and was the first Japanese student to graduate from the University of Cambridge (St. John's College) and the only one to graduate from the University of London in the 19th century. His specialisation was in physics and mathematics. In 1884 he attended the International Meridian Conference in Washington, D.C., and the master class of Kelvin in Baltimore.

== Career ==
After returning to Japan, Kikuchi later became president of Tokyo Imperial University, Minister of Education (1901–1903) and president of Kyoto Imperial University. In 1909 he lectured in London on Japanese Education and 1910 at New York on New Japan: Its Intellectual and Moral Development.

His textbook on elementary geometry was the most widely used geometry textbook in Japan until the end of World War II.

Kikuchi was made a baron under the kazoku peerage system in 1902 and was the eighth president of the Gakushūin Peers' School. In 1917 he became the first president of Riken, but died that same year.

== Family and issue ==
Kikuchi's children became well-known scientists, and his grandson Minobe Ryōkichi became governor of Tokyo.

== See also ==
=== General ===
- Japanese students in Britain
- Tokyo Imperial University
- University of Cambridge
- Anglo-Japanese relations
- Hayashi Tadasu – another member of the group sent to Britain in 1866, by the Bakufu
- Imperial Rescript on Education

=== Japanese at Cambridge ===
Other Japanese who studied at the University of Cambridge after Kikuchi:

- Inagaki Manjirō
- Ōkura Kishichirō
- Suematsu Kenchō
- Tanaka Ginnosuke

=== British contemporaries at Cambridge ===
British contemporaries of Kikuchi at the University of Cambridge:

- Donald MacAlister
- Karl Pearson – a close friend and contemporary of Kikuchi at University College School and the University of Cambridge
- Charles Algernon Parsons

Academic offices
Preceded by Ryohei Okada	President of Kyoto University; 1908–1912	Succeeded by Mitsuru Kuhara
