= Rokkaku clan =

Japanese samurai clan (13th century-1570)

Rokkaku 六角
- The emblem (mon) of the Rokkaku clan
- Home province: Ōmi
- Parent house: Sasaki clan
- Titles: Shugo; Daimyō
- Founder: Rokkaku Yasutsuna (Sasaki Yasutsuna)
- Founding year: 13th century
- Dissolution: 1570
- Ruled until: 1570, defeated by Shibata Katsuie

The Rokkaku clan (六角氏, Rokkaku-shi) was a Japanese samurai clan.

== History ==
Founded by Sasaki Yasutsuna of Ōmi Province in the 13th century, the name Rokkaku was taken from their residence within Kyoto; however, many members of this family continued to be called Sasaki. Over the course of the Muromachi period, members of the clan held the high post of Constable (shugo) of various provinces.

During the Ōnin War (1467–77), which marked the beginning of the Sengoku period, the clan's Kannonji Castle came under assault. As a consequence of defeat in the field, the clan entered a period of decline.

Like other hard-pressed daimyōs, the Rokkaku tried to enhance their military position by giving closer attention to improved civil administration within their domain. For instance, in 1549, the Rokkaku eliminated a paper merchant's guild in Mino under penalty of confiscation. Then they declared a free market in its place.

The Rokkaku were defeated by Oda Nobunaga in 1568 on his march to Kyoto and in 1570 they were absolutely defeated by Shibata Katsuie. During the Edo period, Rokkaku Yoshisuke's descendants were considered a kōke clan.

=== Sengoku period house codes ===
During the Sengoku period, Japan's social and legal culture evolved in ways unrelated to the well-known history of serial battles and armed skirmishes. A number of forward-looking daimyos independently promulgated codes of conduct to be applied within a specific han or domain. Few examples of these daimyo-made law codes have survived, but the legal framework contrived by the Rokkaku clan remains amongst the small number of documents which can still be studied:

- 1567: Rokkaku Yoshikata issues Rokkaku-shi shikimoku.
- 1567: Rokkaku Yoshiharu re-issues Rokkaku-shi shikimoku.

=== Select list of notable Rokkaku ===
- Sasaki Nobutsuna, mid-13th century
- Rokkaku Yasutsuna, 13th century—son of Nobutsuna and the first to take the name Rokkaku.
- Rokkaku Jakusai, 1348–1424—Yamato-e painter
- Rokkaku Masayori, 15th-16th Centuries—Founder of Daisen-in in Kyoto.
- Rokkaku Takayori, d. 1520—fought in Ōnin War.
- Rokkaku Sadayori, 1495–1552
- Rokkaku Yoshikata, 1521–1598—son of Sadayori; founder of Sasaki-ryū of martial arts.
- Rokkaku Yoshiharu, 1545–1612—eldest son of Yoshikata. In 1562, he took on responsibilities in the administration of his father's domain. Later, he entered Ieyasu's service, and his descendants were ranked amongst the kōke. These included the Mitsukuri (箕作) family, notable doctors (who held the position of personal physician to the Matsudaira daimyōs of Tsuyama, Mimasaka Province (modern-day Okayama Prefecture) who took their name from Mitsukuri castle, held by the Rokkaku family, and of whom a notable member was the statesman and scholar Mitsukuri Rinsho. Another descendant was the mathematician Kikuchi Dairoku.
- Rokkaku Yoshisada, 16th Century—son of Yoshikata, younger brother of Yoshiharu.
