= Rokkaku Yoshikata =

Japanese Sengoku period samurai daimyo

- 六角 義賢
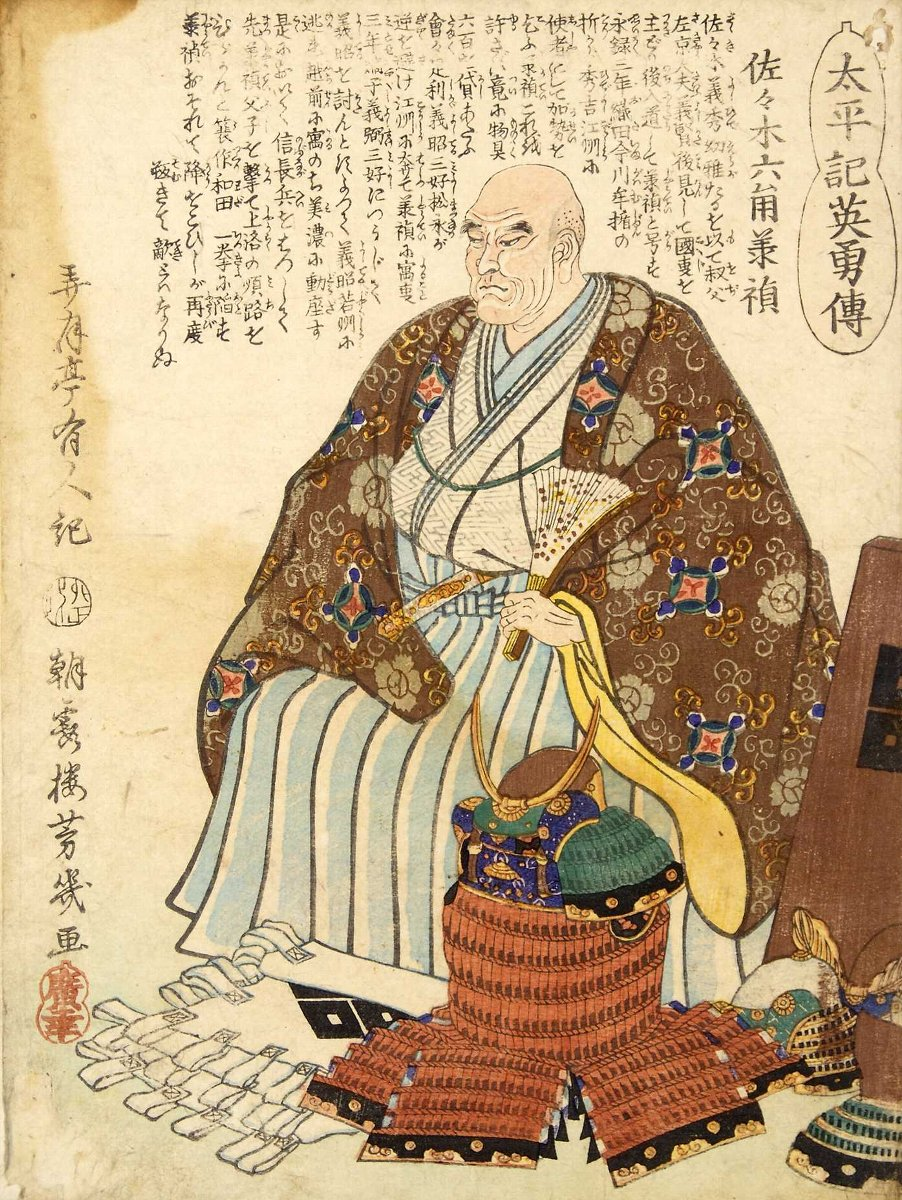

Head of Rokkaku clan
- In office 1552–1559
- Succeeded by: Rokkaku Yoshisuke

Personal details
- Born: 1521
- Died: 19 April 1598 (aged 76–77)

Military service
- Allegiance: Ashikaga Shogunate
- Unit: Rokkaku clan
- Battles/wars: Battle of Norada (1560); Battle of Kannonji (1568); Siege of Kanegasaki (1570); Ishiyama Hongan-ji War (1574–1580)

Rokkaku Yoshikata (六角 義賢; 1521 – 19 April 1598) was a samurai head of the Rokkaku clan during Japan's Sengoku period. He was shugo (governor) and later daimyō of an area of southern Ōmi province, he served as castellan of Kannonji Castle. He later became a Buddhist monk, under the name Shōtei.

(Sumitate-Yotsumeyui), The Crest of the Rokkaku clan

== Biography ==
The son of Rokkaku Sadayori, Yoshikata fought in many of the battles for control of the Kyoto area during this period. In 1549, he became allied with Hosokawa Harumoto against Miyoshi Chōkei, and succeeded his father as head of the family in 1552. After a number of victories against the Miyoshi, the tides turned; Yoshikata and his Hosokawa allies in service of the shōgun Ashikaga Yoshiteru began to experience a string of defeats. In 1558, the shōgun reconciled his differences with the Miyoshi clan, putting an end to the conflict.

Seeing an opportunity, Azai Hisamasa of northern Ōmi invaded the Rokkaku territory. Defeated, the Azai clan was forced to become vassals to the Rokkaku. Yoshikata entered the Buddhist priesthood in 1559, passing on his status within the family to his son Rokkaku Yoshisuke, but remained active in the family's battles nevertheless. Yoshikata led his clan's forces to battle the following year against Azai Nagamasa, seeking to maintain his control over the Azai and their territory. He was sorely defeated in this, the battle of Norada, which marked the beginning of the decline of the Rokkaku clan.

In 1563, one of their chief vassals, Gotō Katatoyo, killed someone inside Kannonji Castle (see Kannonji Disturbance). Distrust between the Rokkaku lords and their retainers reached the point that Yoshikata and his son were driven from the castle. They returned soon afterwards, however, through the mediation of Gamō Sadahide and Gamō Katahide.

In 1565, the Rokkaku were again attacked by the Azai; and the invading forces were contained.

In 1568, Oda Nobunaga, in the service of shōgun Ashikaga Yoshiaki, asked the Rokkaku to join his army, and was refused. Defeated in the ensuing battle, the Rokkaku were driven from their castle, settling in Kōka, their clan effectively eliminated as daimyō.

In 1570, after Siege of Kanegasaki, the Rokkaku were defeated by Shibata Katsuie at Chōkōji castle, and again at Bodaiji castle, eventually submitting to Nobunaga. At Nobunaga's orders, Yoshikata was imprisoned in Ishibe castle, held by Sakuma Nobumori. He escaped four years later in 1574, fleeing to Shigaraki. There, he lived in seclusion, aiding local movements, and the Ishiyama Hongan-ji, against Nobunaga.

Yoshikata died at the age of 77 in 1598. During his life, he studied archery under Yoshida Shigemasa, and began his own school of horsemanship, the Sasaki-ryū.

=== Sengoku period house codes ===
During the Sengoku period, Japan's social and legal culture evolved in ways unrelated to the well-known history of serial battles and armed skirmishes. A number of forward-looking daimyos independently promulgated codes of conduct to be applied within a specific han or domain. Few examples of these daimyo-made law codes have survived, but the legal framework contrived by the Rokkaku clan remains amongst the small number of documents which can still be studied:

- 1567: Rokkaku Yoshikata issues Rokkaku-shi shikimoku.
- 1567: Rokkaku Yoshiharu, Yoshikata's eldest son, re-issues Rokkaku-shi shikimoku.
