= Kannonji Castle =

Japanese castle

- 観音寺城
- Azuchi, Ōmihachiman, Shiga Japan
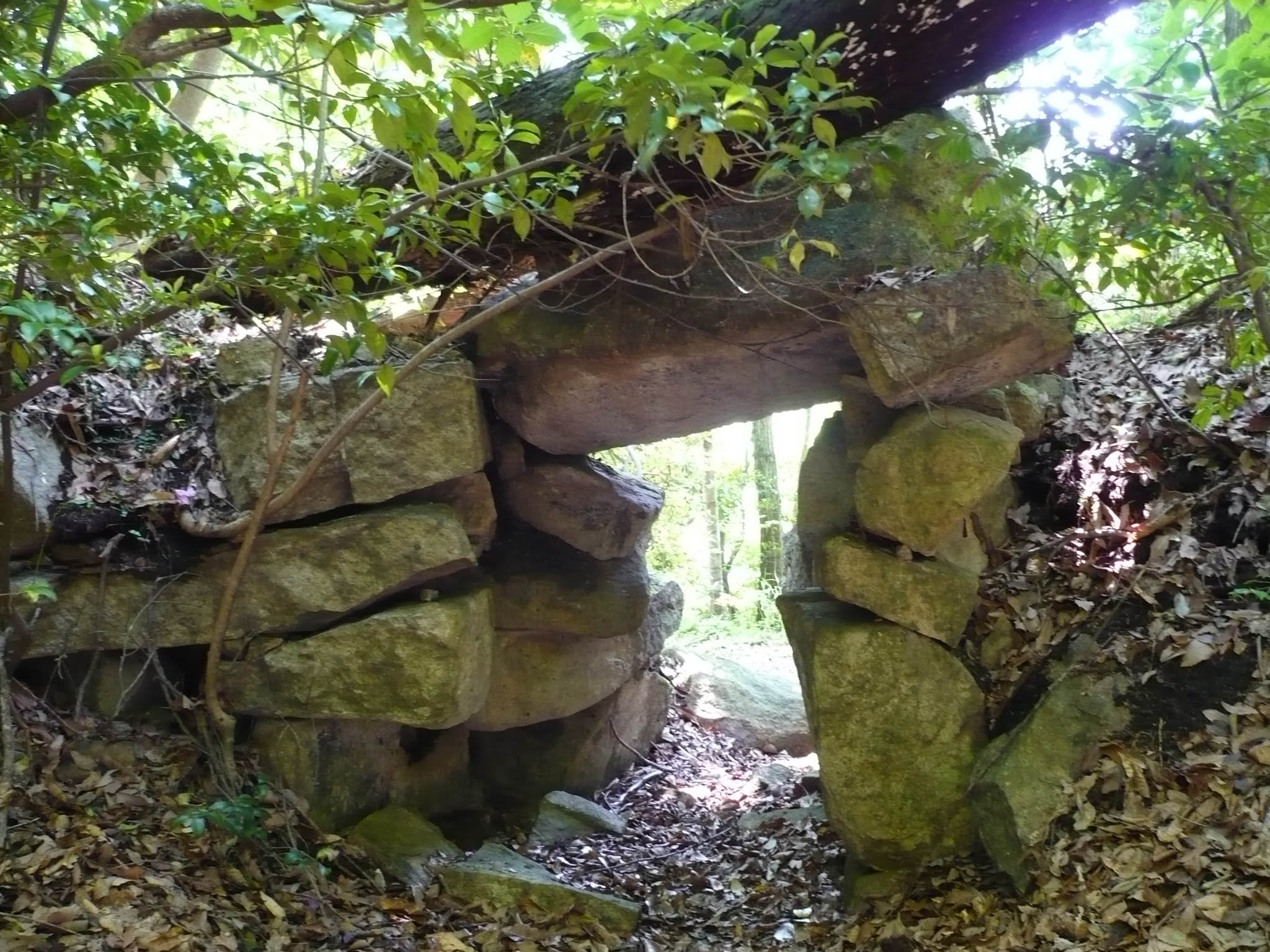
- ruins of Kannonji Castle

Site information
- Type: Mountain castle (山城)
- Controlled by: Azuchi, Shiga
- Open to the public: yes
- Condition: Ruins

Location
- Location of Kannonji Castle ruins Kannonji Castle (Japan)
- Coordinates: 35.146027°N 136.157778°E

Site history
- Built: c.1468
- Built by: Rokkaku clan
- In use: 1468 – 1582
- Materials: Stone, wood
- Battles/wars: Onin War
- Events: Conquered by Oda Nobunaga (1568)

Kannonji Castle (観音寺城, Kannonji-jō) was a Sengoku period yamashiro-style Japanese castle located in what is now the Azuchi neighborhood of the city of Ōmihachiman, Shiga Prefecture, Japan. The ruins have been protected as a National Historic Site since 1982, with the area under protection expanded in 1984. The castle was named after Kannonshō-ji, a Buddhist temple near the peak of the mountain.

== Background ==
Kannonji Castle is located on the ridgeline of Mount Kinugasa, a 400-meter mountain, not far from the ruins of Azuchi Castle. The castle is in proximity to Lake Biwa and to control both the Nakasendō and Tōkaidō highways connecting Kyoto with the eastern provinces, and the Hokkoku Kaidō highway connecting Kyoto with the Sea of Japan. The precise year the castle was constructed is uncertain, but it was constructed some time during the 14th century by the Rokkaku clan, a cadet branch of the Sasaki clan, a military house which rose to prominence in the Kamakura period. The Rokkaku held the post of shugo of Ōmi Province, but effectively controlled only the southern half of the province, as the northern half was dominated by a rival cadet clan, the Kyogoku clan. A castle was needed as an administrative center and military rallying point. The ridged peak of Kinugasa Mountain, where Kannonsho-ji was already, was selected as the new site. A castle from that lofty position would command a view of the plains below and would serve as a symbol of power in the region. The castle was rebuilt during the Ōnin era (1467-1477); it was originally named Sasaki Castle.

== History ==
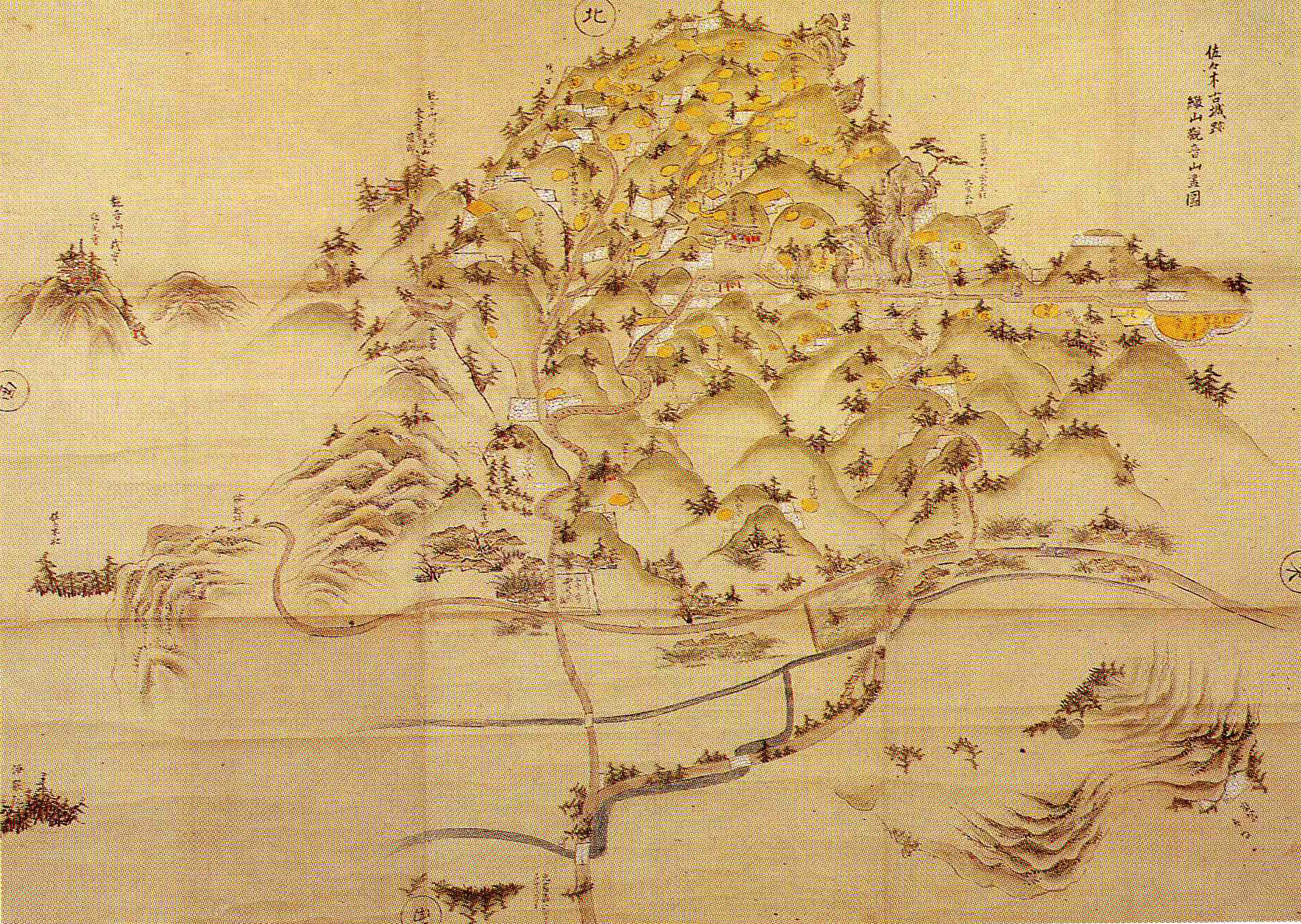
Old map of the castle

Kannonji Castle was attacked and changed hands three times during the Ōnin War; twice in battles between the Rokkaku and the Kyogoku, and the final time in a struggle between rival branches of the Rokkaku clan itself. Under Rokkaku Takayori (d.1520), the clan was reunified, and significantly gained in strength as Rokkaku Takayori seized estates from nobles and Buddhist temples throughout his territories, with the backing of the Muromachi shogunate. Under his son, Rokkaku Sadayori (1495-1552), the territory prospered greatly by the abolishment of the local guild system in Ishidera, the castle town at the base of Kannonji Castle. he also supported Shogun Ashikaga Yoshiharu when he was expelled from Kyoto and used his influence to bring the Azai clan (who controlled Echizen Province and part of northern Ōmi under his control. Renovations to the castle were done during the Kōji era (1555–1558), and the stone ramparts were enlarged to accommodate small cannons.

However, under his son Rokkaku Yoshikata (1521-1598), the clan's fortunes began to decline. The Azai, under the capable Azai Nagamasa broke from their Rokkaku overlords, defeating a large Rokkaku army which had been sent against them. In addition to this humiliating defeat, Rokkaku Yoshikata faced revolts by some of his main retainers, and at one point was even expelled from Kannonji Castle by his own erstwhile retainers. To complicate matters further, the aggressive Oda Nobunaga was rapidly expanding his influence westward towards Kyoto. After capturing Mino Province, Nobunaga allied himself with the Azai clan and with the exiled Ashikaga Yoshiaki, with whom was determined to march on Kyoto. The Rokkaku clan at Kannonji Castle was in the path of his advance. The Rokkaku, loyal to the Ashikaga shōgun, attempted to disrupt to Nobunaga's advance, but were soundly defeated by Niwa Nagahide. Nobunaga entered Kannonji Castle unopposed and in triumph, before resuming his march to Kyoto.

Yoshikata fled south to the mountainous Kōka region where he continued to resist Nobunaga for several years from Mikumo Castle, but was unable to recover Kannonji Castle. Nobunaga continued to hold Kannonji castle as a defensive point after the completion of Azuchi Castle. On Nobunaga's assassination in 1582, Kannonji Castle was attacked and burned, along with Azuchi Castle, possibly at the hands of looters from among the local peasantry.

== Structure ==
Kannonji Castle was one of the largest mountain castles in Japan, and gradually expanded to cover most of Mount Kinugasa, with the major areas of the castle spread along with the southern slope of the ridges spread east and west ward from the highest position. Along the slope numerous terraces were built and used for the residences of Rokkaku clan and their retainers. The outer Iines and core areas of the castle had stone walls, but as this was a relatively new innovation for the time, the walls were rather low and the main defenses remained earthen ramparts and dry moats with a system of overlooking enclosures. The total area of the castle is estimated to have been 800 meters in length and 400 meters in width.

Nothing remains of the castle today except for fragmentary ruins of stone walls, a stone-lined well, and a historical signboard. Much of the secondary areas of the castle were recovered by Kannonshō-ji temple, which became a popular pilgrimage location in the Edo period.

In 1969 and 1970, artifacts were discovered during archaeological excavations in the main enclosure (hon-maru).

== Significance ==
Kannonji Castle is regarded as among Japan's Five Greatest Mountain Castles, along with Kasugayama Castle, Nanao Castle, Odani Castle and Gassantoda Castle.The castle was listed as one of Japan's Top 100 Castles by the Japan Castle Foundation in 2006.

== Access ==
If hiking, the trail head that leads up the west side of Kinugasa Mountain (433m) is about a 25-minute walk from Azuchi Station on the JR West Biwako Line, or about 10 minutes from the nearby Azuchi Castle Archaeology Museum and the Nobunaga Hall. The trail leads up the west side of the mountain, first to the ancient temple Kuwanomi-dera (桑実寺), then through a forest of Japanese cedars, and up to Kannonji Castle site. From the main courtyard, there is a trail leading on to Kannonsho-ji, a temple with an impressive panoramic view.

If driving, there are two roads that lead up the mountain. One follows a spur on the southwest slope and is accessed near the Nakasendō Highway (Japan National Route 8) in Azuchi. The other leads up the eastern slope, and can be found near Route 202 off the Nakasendō Highway in the neighboring town of Gokashō. Both roads lead to Kannonsho-ji, a few minutes' walk from Kannonji Castle ruins.

== Gallery ==
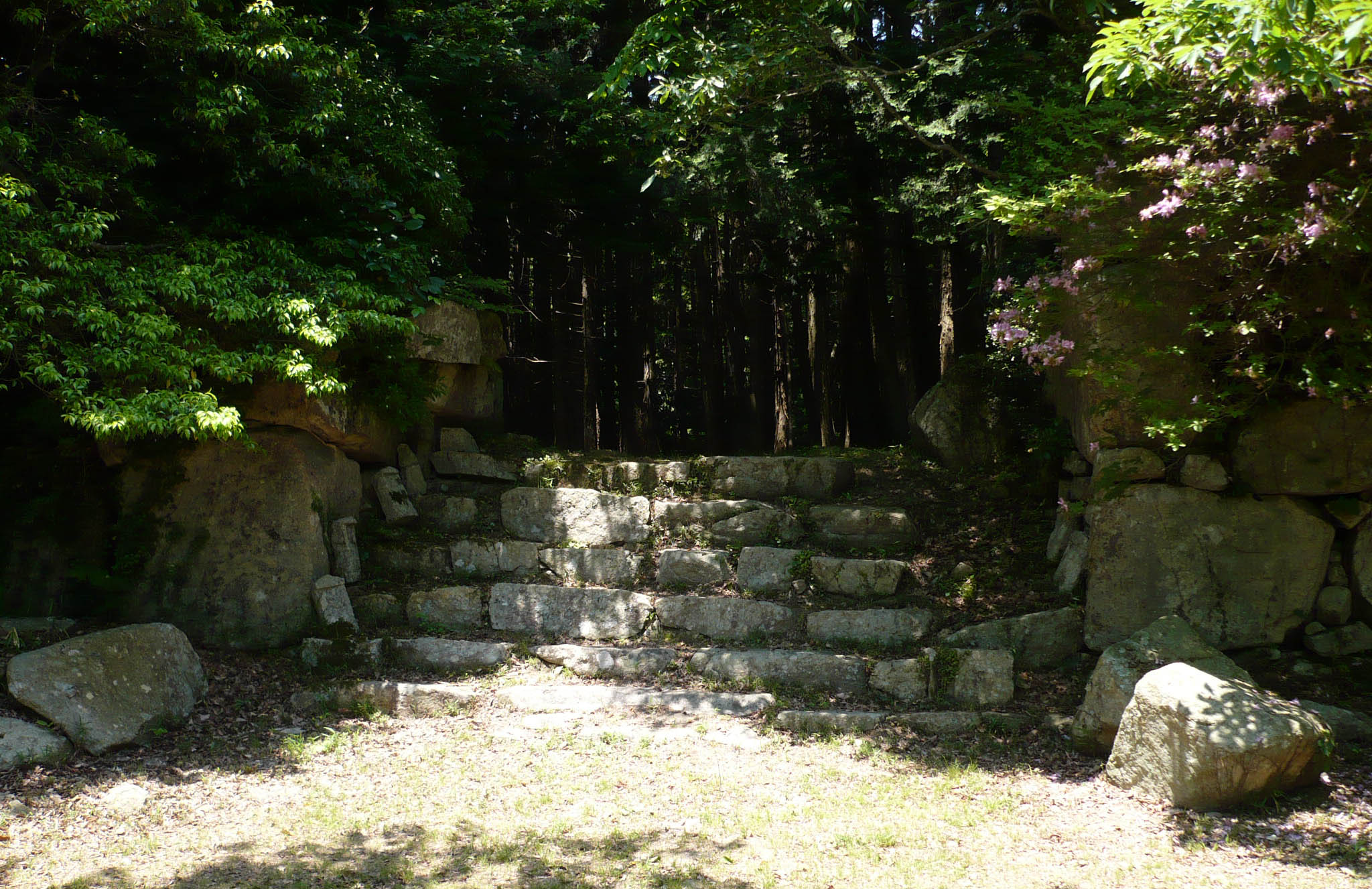

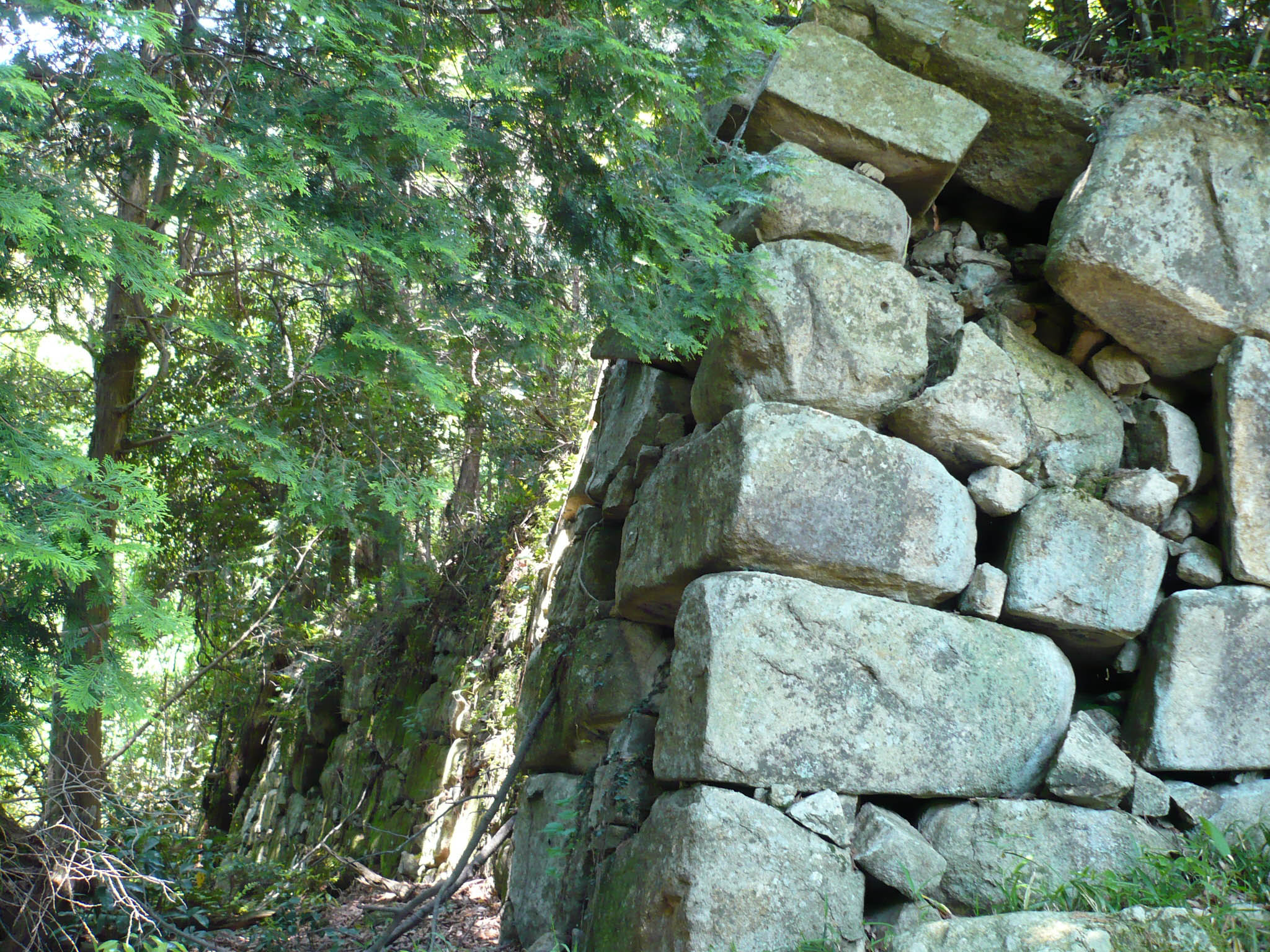

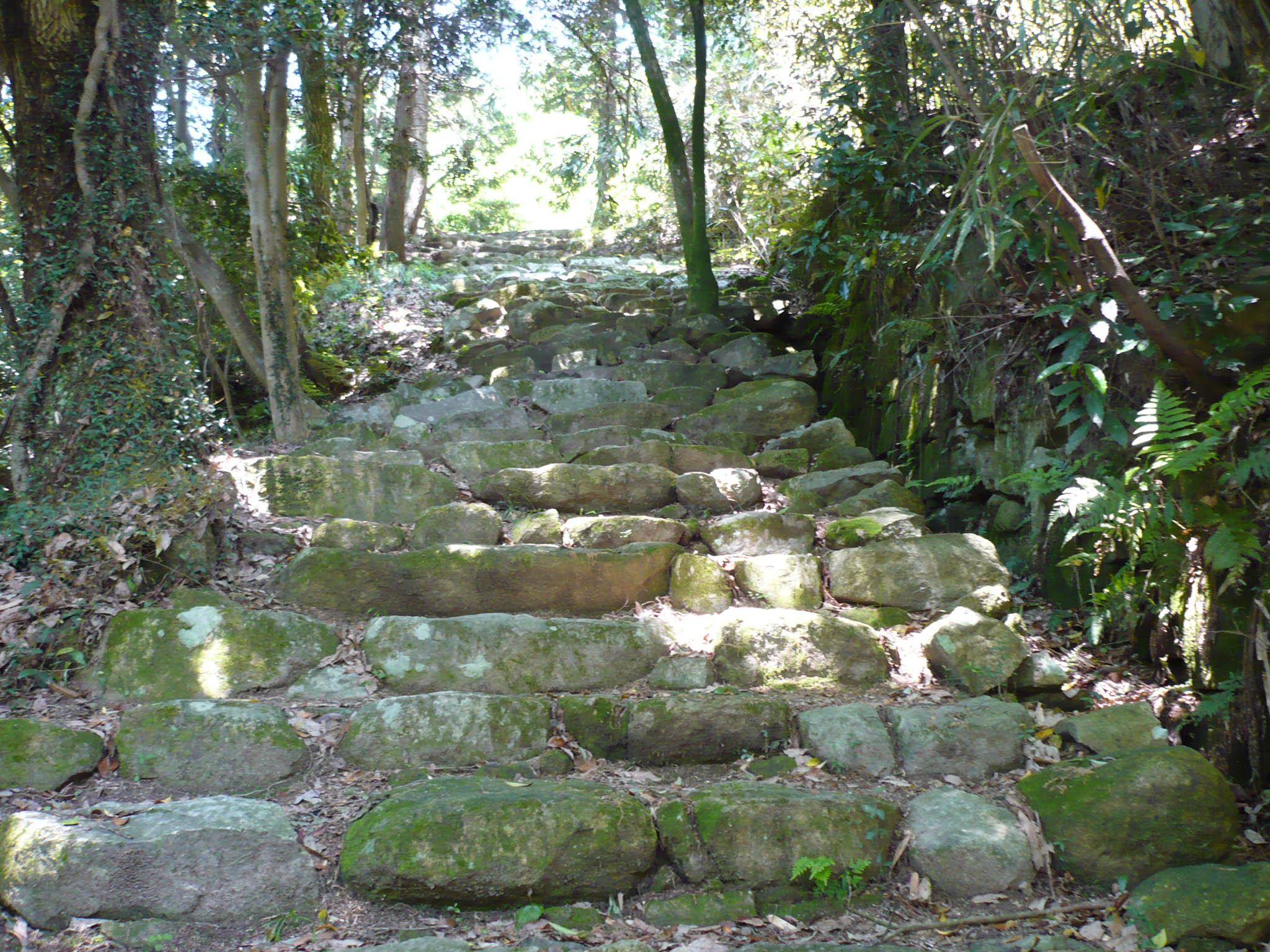

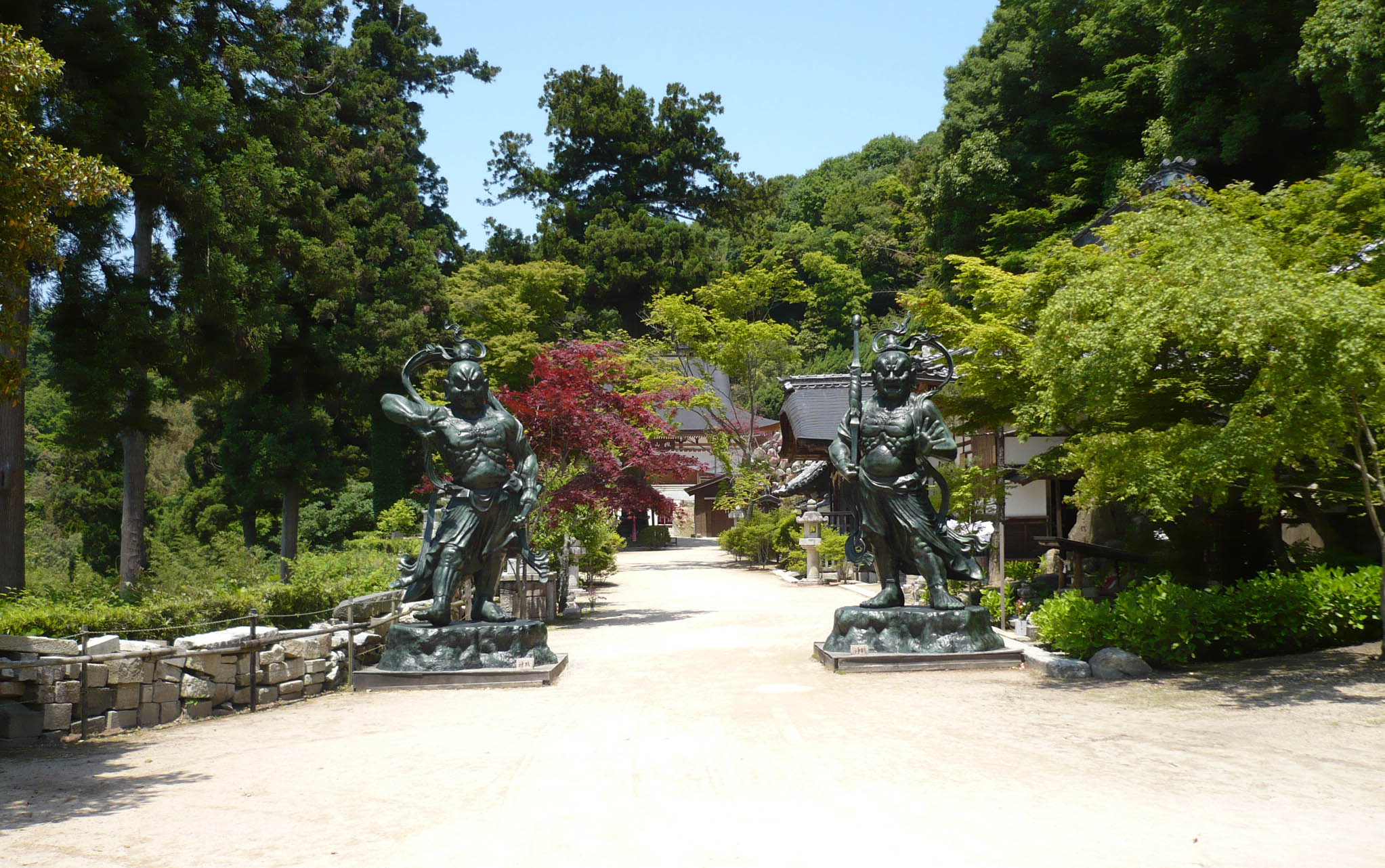

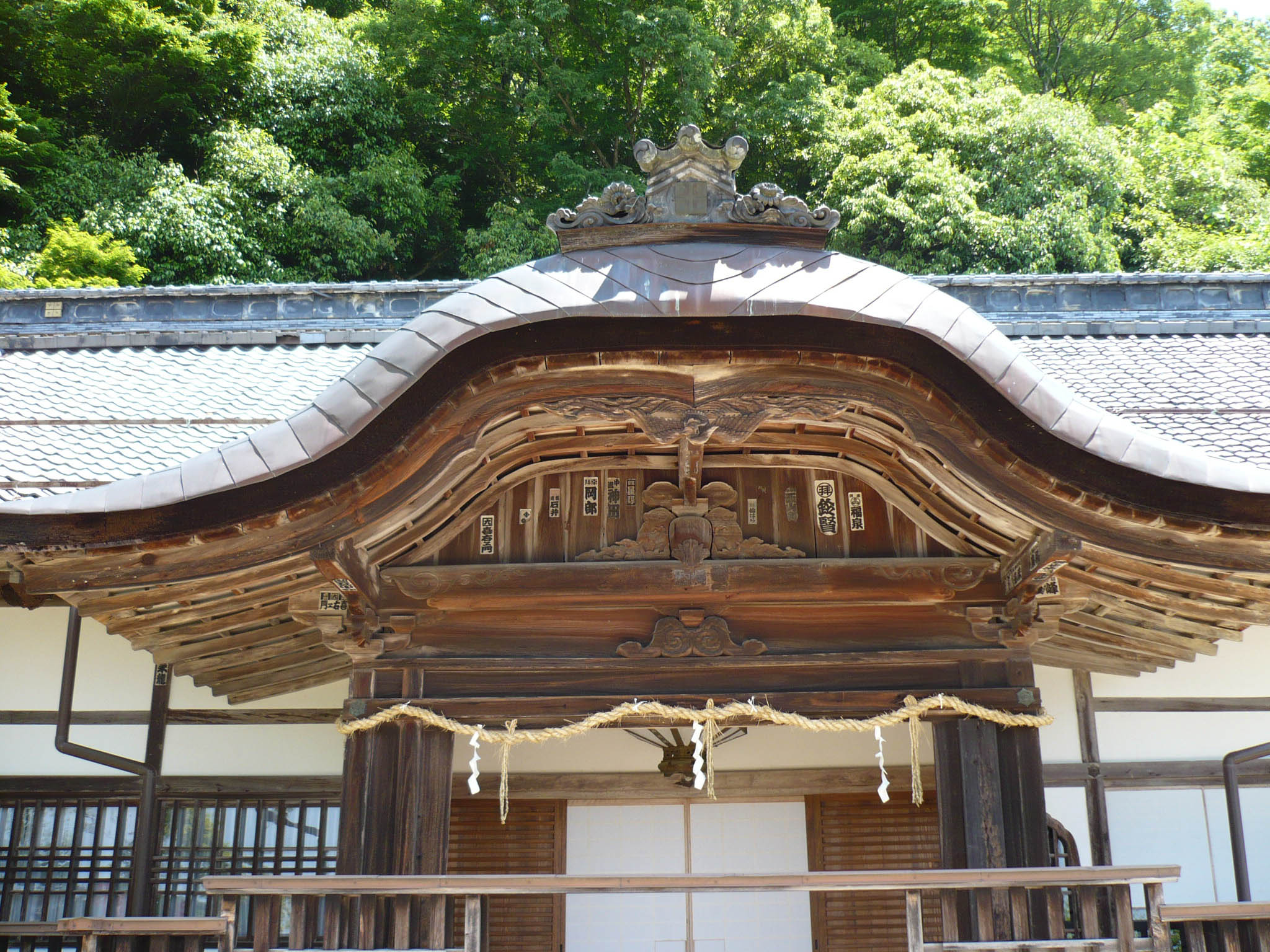

== See also ==
- List of Historic Sites of Japan (Shiga)

== Literature ==
- De Lange, William (2021). An Encyclopedia of Japanese Castles. Groningen: Toyo Press. pp. 600 pages. ISBN 978-9492722300.
- Schmorleitz, Morton S. (1974). Castles in Japan. Tokyo: Charles E. Tuttle Co. pp. 144–145. ISBN 0-8048-1102-4.
- Motoo, Hinago (1986). Japanese Castles. Tokyo: Kodansha. p. 200 pages. ISBN 0-87011-766-1.
- Mitchelhill, Jennifer (2004). Castles of the Samurai: Power and Beauty. Tokyo: Kodansha. p. 112 pages. ISBN 4-7700-2954-3.
- Turnbull, Stephen (2003). Japanese Castles 1540-1640. Osprey Publishing. p. 64 pages. ISBN 1-84176-429-9.
