= Kōke =

Japanese noble rank

A kōke (高家; "high families") during the Edo period in Japan generally referred to the hereditary position of the "Master of Ceremonies", held by certain fief-less samurai ranking below a daimyō. Historically, or in a more general context, the term may refer to a family of old lineage and distinction.

Perhaps the most famous Master of Ceremonies in history was Kira Yoshinaka aka Kira Kōzuke-no-suke (吉良上野介), the real-life model of the villain avenged in the tale of the forty-seven rōnin of Akō.

== Overview ==
The office of kōke is typically translated "Master of Ceremonies" or "Master of Court Ceremony".

The men who kōke position performed such roles as that of the courier carrying the shōgun's messages to the Imperial court in Kyoto, or one of a reception committee for hosting the Imperial Envoys at Edo. They also represented the shogun in certain functions held at Nikkō and other shrines or temples, and regulated courtly ceremonies and rites observed in the Edo Castle.

The office was instituted in 1608, when the Tokugawa shogunate selected certain ancient great dispossessed families to fill the hereditary office. Most of these families claimed descent from shugo (governors) of the Kamakura period to Sengoku period, among them the Takeda, the Imagawa, the Kyōgoku, the Rokkaku, the Ōtomo, the Toki, the Isshiki and the Hatakeyama (a full list is given below). Some families were less prestigious, like the Yokose, the Yura, the Ōsawa, and the Kira. By the end of the shogunate in the mid-19th century, the occupancy of the office numbered 26. Some families had several branches among the kōke, like the Takeda who had two lateral branches with that title.

The kōke families had land income assessed at less than ten thousand koku which ranked them below a daimyō lord, but were higher ranked than the run-of-the-mill hatamoto (Tokugawa bannermen). Unlike the ordinary hatamoto whose duties were military, the kōke had certain privileged missions. Note that kōke is still treated as part of the hatamoto in some sources.

Below the kōke, about 10 families bore the title of omote-kōke (表高家). Actually, those who were already serving office were called oku-kōke (奥高家) as opposed to the omote-kōke who were either unappointed or on standby (including minors still not old enough). Although the omote-kōke who has not been appointed were not given any courtly ranks, the appointed oku-kōke was promoted Junior Fifth Rank, Lower Grade (従五位下, jugoi no ge) or higher, which was necessitated in order to grant them privileges to attend the Emperor's Court.

== List ==
- Arima clan
- Isshiki clan
- Imagawa clan
- Uesugi clan
- Ōsawa clan
- Ōtomo clan
- Oda clan
- Kyōgoku clan
- Kira clan
- Shinagawa clan
- Takeda clan
- Nagasawa clan
- Toki clan
- Toda clan
- Chūjō clan
- Hatakeyama clan
- Hino clan
- Maeda clan
- Miyahara clan
- Mogami clan
- Yura clan
- Yokose clan
- Rokkaku clan

== See also ==
- Master of Ceremonies (Japan)
