= Mitsukuri =

Mitsukuri (written: 箕作 or 三栗) is a Japanese surname. Notable people with the surname include:

- Kakichi Mitsukuri (箕作 佳吉) (1857–1909), Japanese zoologist
- Mitsukuri Rinsho (箕作 麟祥) (1846–1897), Japanese jurist and educator
- Takashi Mitsukuri (三栗 崇) (born 1939), Japanese gymnast
