= Kousa =

Kousa may refer to:

- Kousa dogwood (Cornus kousa)
- kousa or kōsa, known as Asian Dust
- Kōsa (also known as Honganji Kennyo), the leader of Ishiyama Hongan-ji and Ikkō-Ikki rebels.
- Kousa or kusa, a type of squash (fruit) in the Levant, similar to the zucchini
