= Ishiyama Hongan-ji War =

1570 to 1580 military campaign in Japan

Siege of Ishiyama Hongan-ji
- Part of the Sengoku period
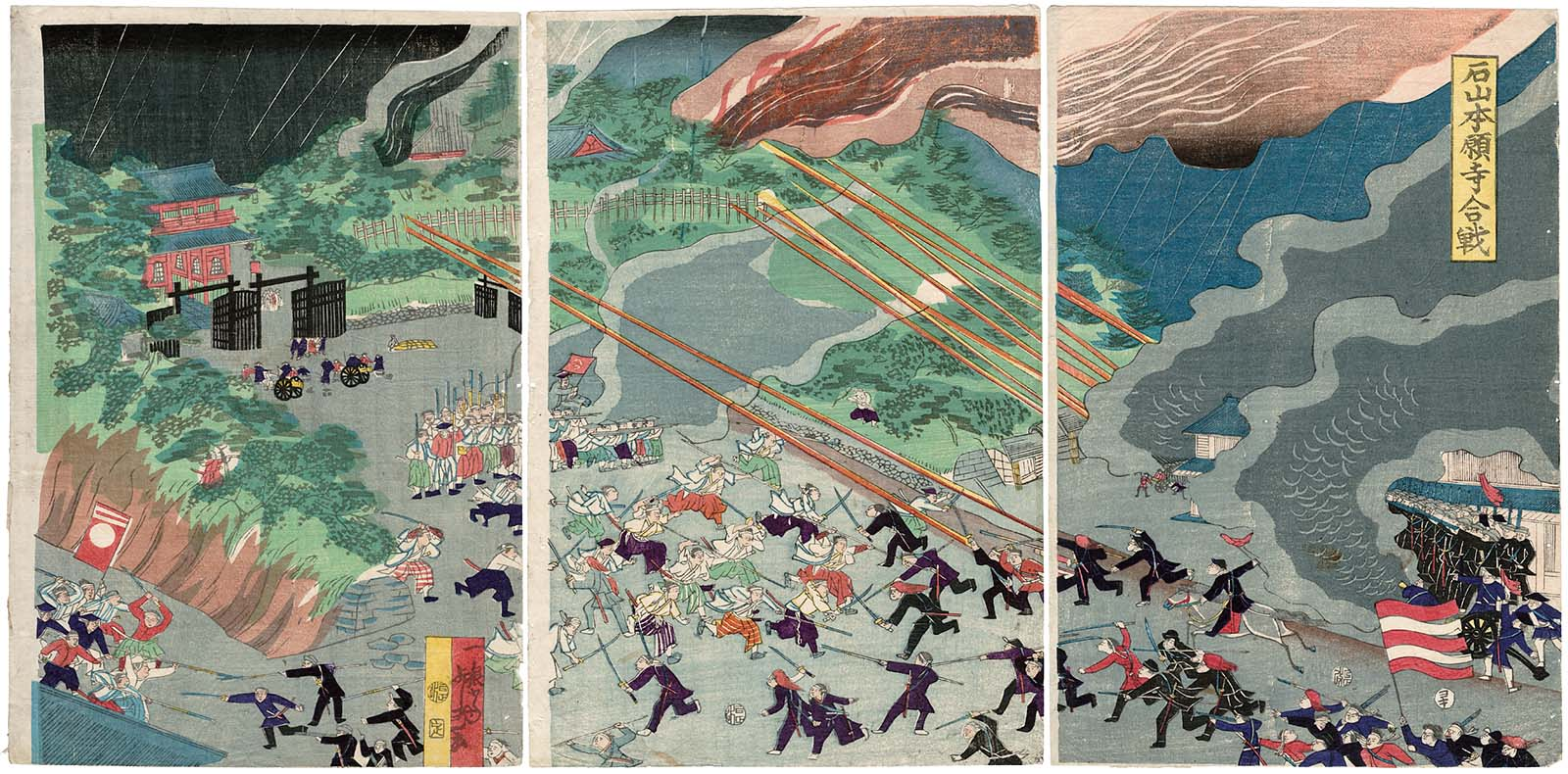
- The battle of Ishiyama Hongan-ji by Utagawa Yoshifuji (1828-1887)
Date	August 1570 – August 1580
Location	Osaka, Fortress of Ishiyama Hongan-ji; other ikki strongholds
Result	Oda victory, Kōsa surrenders

Belligerents
forces of Oda Nobunaga	Ikkō-ikki monks forces of Ashikaga Yoshiaki; Mōri clan

Commanders and leaders
Oda Nobunaga; Sakuma Nobumori; Niwa Nagahide; Akechi Mitsuhide; Harada Naomasa †; Araki Murashige; Takayama Ukon; Hosokawa Fujitaka; Inaba Yoshimichi; Andō Morinari; Ikoma Chikamasa; Shiōden Masataka	Kōsa; Shimozuma Nakayuki; Shimozuma Rairyū; Saika Magoichi; Ashikaga Yoshiaki; Rokkaku Yoshikata; Mori Terumoto

Strength
At least 30,000	At least 15,000

The Ishiyama Hongan-ji War (石山合戦, Ishiyama Kassen) was a ten-year military campaign that took place from 1570 to 1580 in Sengoku period Japan, carried out by lord Oda Nobunaga against a network of fortifications, temples, and communities belonging to the Ikkō-ikki, a powerful faction of Jōdo Shinshū Buddhist monks and peasants opposed to the rule of the samurai class.

It centered on attempts to take down the Ikki's central base, the cathedral fortress of Ishiyama Hongan-ji, in what is today the city of Osaka. While Nobunaga and his allies led attacks on Ikki communities and fortifications in the nearby provinces, weakening the Hongan-ji's support structure, elements of his army remained camped outside the Hongan-ji, blocking supplies to the fortress and serving as scouts.

== Background ==
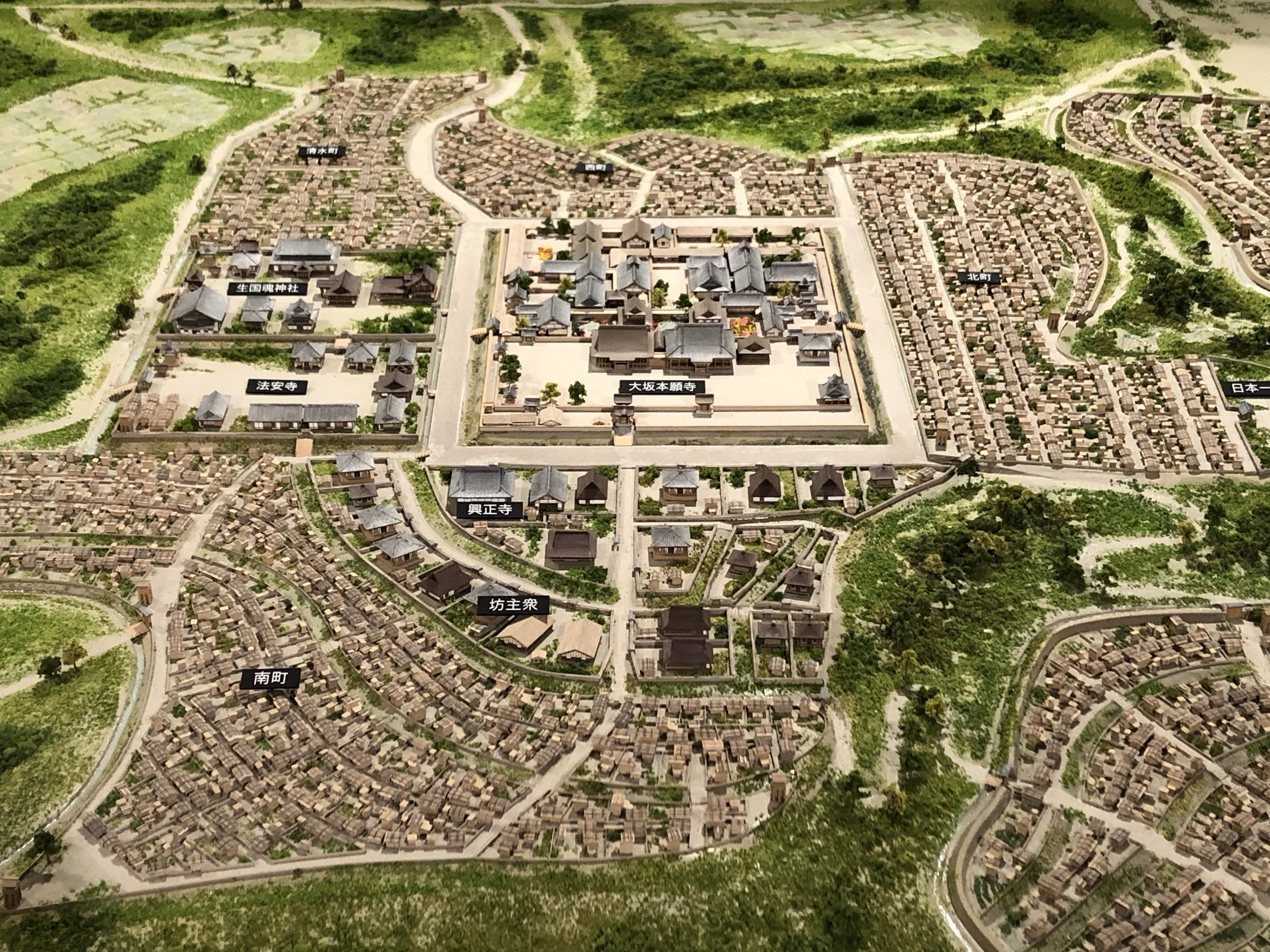
Model of the Ishiyama Hongan-ji

The Ikkō-ikki leagues of warrior monks and commoners were among the last to stand in the way of Oda Nobunaga's bid to conquer all of Japan. Oda and Tokugawa had fought the Ikki before, crushing their armies of Mikawa Province and other areas, and by 1570, their twin fortresses of Ishiyama Hongan-ji and Nagashima were their last bastions of strength. He besieged both fortresses simultaneously, attacking Ishiyama in August 1570 and Nagashima in 1571.

== Siege ==
In August 1570, Oda Nobunaga left Gifu Castle in Gifu with 30,000 troops, and ordered his generals to build fortresses around Ishiyama, while Nobunaga himself focused on the Sieges of Nagashima fortress and other campaigns. On September 12, the Ikkō-ikki launched a midnight stealth attack against Nobunaga's forces at Kawaguchi and Takadono. The Ikko were reinforced by warrior monks from Negoro-ji in Kii Province and 3,000 musketeers, pushing Oda's army back. Nobunaga's armies remained camped out, assigned to monitor the Ikki's fortress, and take it if they could.

In 1574, after destroying the Nagashima complex and reducing the threat from the Ikki's supporters, Oda attempted to starve out the fortress. This was no easy task, however, because the Ishiyama fortress sat on the coast, which was guarded by the fleet of the Mōri clan, masters of naval combat and Oda's enemies.

By early 1575, however, the fortress was already in urgent need of supplies, and the Abbot Kōsa was ready to begin peaceful overtures with Nobunaga to end the siege. But the ousted shōgun Ashikaga Yoshiaki sent a letter to Mōri Terumoto asking for his aid in supplying the cathedral fortress. Yoshiaki eventually raised some troops himself to aid the besieged.

=== Battle of Tennoji ===
In April 1576, Oda's army attacked the Hongan-ji fortress, led by Harada Naomasa, Akechi Mitsuhide, Hosokawa Fujitaka, Tsutsui Junkei, Nakagawa Kiyohide, Takayama Ukon, Araki Murashige, and Sakuma Nobuhide, but Oda forces were quickly repelled by 15,000 Ikkō-ikki defenders. Mitsuhide and Nobuhide made a request for reinforcements to Nobunaga who was staying in Kyōto.

=== Attack on Mitsuji fortress ===
Later in May 1576, Nobunaga himself personally came. Nobunaga took part in an attack on the fortress. He led a number of ashigaru (peasants) army of only 3,000 men to attack as many as 15,000 enemy forces, along with Niwa Nagahide, Hashiba Hideyoshi, Takigawa Kazumasu, Hachiya Yoritaka and Inaba Yoshimichi. Nobunaga attacked Mitsuji fortress, pushing back the Ikki garrison to their inner gates and Nobunaga suffered a bullet wound to his leg. However, Harada Naomasa lost his life during the battle.

=== The fall of Ishiyama Hongan-ji ===
Later in 1577, Sakuma Nobumori was chosen as Harada's replacement as commander of the Siege of Ishiyama Hongan-ji and given troops from seven provinces placing him in command of the largest Oda-clan army among the Oda retainers. By then, 51 outposts had been built around the central fortress, many equipped with arquebus squads. But Nobumori made no progress against the Hongan-ji forces and in the meantime Kuki Yoshitaka failed to blockade Mōri supply lines in the first Battle of Kizugawaguchi.

Oda Nobunaga was forced to revise his tactics and began to attack the outposts, and the supporters of the Ikko-ikki. Nobunaga ordered Shibata Katsuie to conquer the Hokuriku region, sent Takigawa Kazumasu to suppress ikko-ikki rebels at Kii province, Hashiba Hideyoshi to conquer the Chūgoku region from the Mori clan, and Akechi Mitsuhide to pacify Tanba Province in 1577, and Nobunaga eventually blocked the Mōri's supply lines.

In 1578, Nobunaga accused Araki Murashige of sympathies to the Mōri clan, and enlisted Kuki Yoshitaka to set up a blockade and disrupt the fortress' supply lines from the Mōri navy with massive new battleships. Later, in the Second Battle of Kizugawaguchi, Kuki Yoshitaka broke the Mōri supply lines for good. Nobunaga also gave orders to Hideyoshi to besiege Mōri's Miki castle at Harima province.

However in 1579, the Mori clan lost their strategic castle at Miki and Itami Castle.

By then in 1580, the siege was beginning to swing in Nobunaga's favor. The majority of the Ikko-ikki's allies were already inside the fortress with them, so they had no one to call on for aid. The Ikko-ikki under the leadership of Shimozuma Nakayuki continued to fight, eventually the defenders almost ran out of ammunition and food. The monshu at the time, Kennyo, held a conference with his comrades, after receiving a letter of advice from the imperial court via imperial envoys in April 1580. Kennyo and his son surrendered a few weeks later. The fighting finally ended in August 1580.

== Aftermath ==
With respect to Imperial order, Nobunaga spared the lives of many of the defenders, including Shimozuma Nakayuki, but burned the fortress to the ground.

In the same year, following the fall of the Honganji, Nobunaga accused Sakuma Nobumori and dismissed Ando Morinari from Nobunaga's service.

Three years later in 1583, Toyotomi Hideyoshi would begin construction on the same site, building Osaka Castle, a replica of which was constructed in the 20th century.
