= Shimotsuma Rairen =

Japanese monk (1537–1626)

Shimotsuma Nakayuki (下間仲行) (1537 – 1626), famously known as Shimotsuma Rairen (下間頼廉), was a Japanese Shin Buddhist priest within Hongan-ji. He led on the defence of Siege of Ishiyama Hongan-ji between 1570 and 1580. During that time the temple was in conflict from Oda Nobunaga. Rairen played a role in the peace treaty with Nobunaga and later moved to the region of Tenmangū to serve Honganji Kennyo and Hideyoshi.

In 1570, in opposition to Oda Nobunaga's demand to surrender Hongan-ji Temple, Kennyo, the 11th head priest of Ishiyama Hongan-ji Temple, sent a manifesto to all Hongan-ji Temple followers nationwide, sparking the Ishiyama War. At that time, Yoritan was one of the people sent to Gansho-ji Temple in Ise Province by Kennyo's order to provide guidance on the ground.

Yoritan was one of the monks who had been given high authority, and when he entered Nagashima, he led his followers together with Shimotsuma Yorinari and attacked Furukie Castle in Owari, which was defended by Oda Nobuoki (Nobunaga's younger brother), on November 21 of the same year, with a large army that was joined by the Hattori clan of Yatomi, Owari, and local farmers, and defeated Nobuoki, bringing Furukie Castle under his control.

First Invasion of Nagashima In 1571, Oda Nobunaga attacked Nagashima with a large army of over 50,000 men in order to annihilate the Nagashima Ikko Ikki. In response, Yoritan deployed a defensive battle, taking advantage of the terrain of Nagashima, which has many islands and makes it difficult to take advantage of a large army. He waited for the Oda army by stationing the Saika-shu, local samurai, and followers from Kii at Shinohashi Fort, Fuchoda Fort, and Morishima Fort. In this battle, the Mino forces led by Shibata Katsuie, who were trying to cross the sandbar from the Otaguchi entrance of Nishikawagishi to reach the fort, were hit with a barrage of guns and bows from the fort and the mountains, dealing a heavy blow. They then pursued the retreating Shibata forces, wounding Katsuie, and defeated and killed Ujiie Bokuzen, who had taken the place of Shibata's rear guard, and succeeded in repelling the Oda forces.

However, the Oda forces did not give up, and in the second invasion of Nagashima in 1573, all of the castles of the powerful clans that had been cooperative around Nagashima were captured, weakening their strength. In the third invasion of Nagashima in 1574, the Oda forces, totaling 80,000 men, besieged each fort individually, cutting off cooperation and leaving them with no option but to siege. With the Oda forces controlling land and sea traffic, Nagashima gradually ran out of food and suffered from starvation.

Under these circumstances, on September 25th of the same year, Yoritan asked the Oda forces to surrender on the condition that "the lives of those holed up in Nagashima be spared", and Nobunaga agreed, so Yoritan finally surrendered. However, this was a plot by Nobunaga, and on September 29th, when Yoritan left the castle to surrender it, he was shot dead along with his followers in the vicinity by a volley of gunfire from the Oda forces.
