= Osaka Castle =

Historic castle in the Chūō-ku ward of Osaka, Japan

Coordinates: 34°41′14″N 135°31′33″E

Osaka Castle 大坂城
- Osaka, Japan
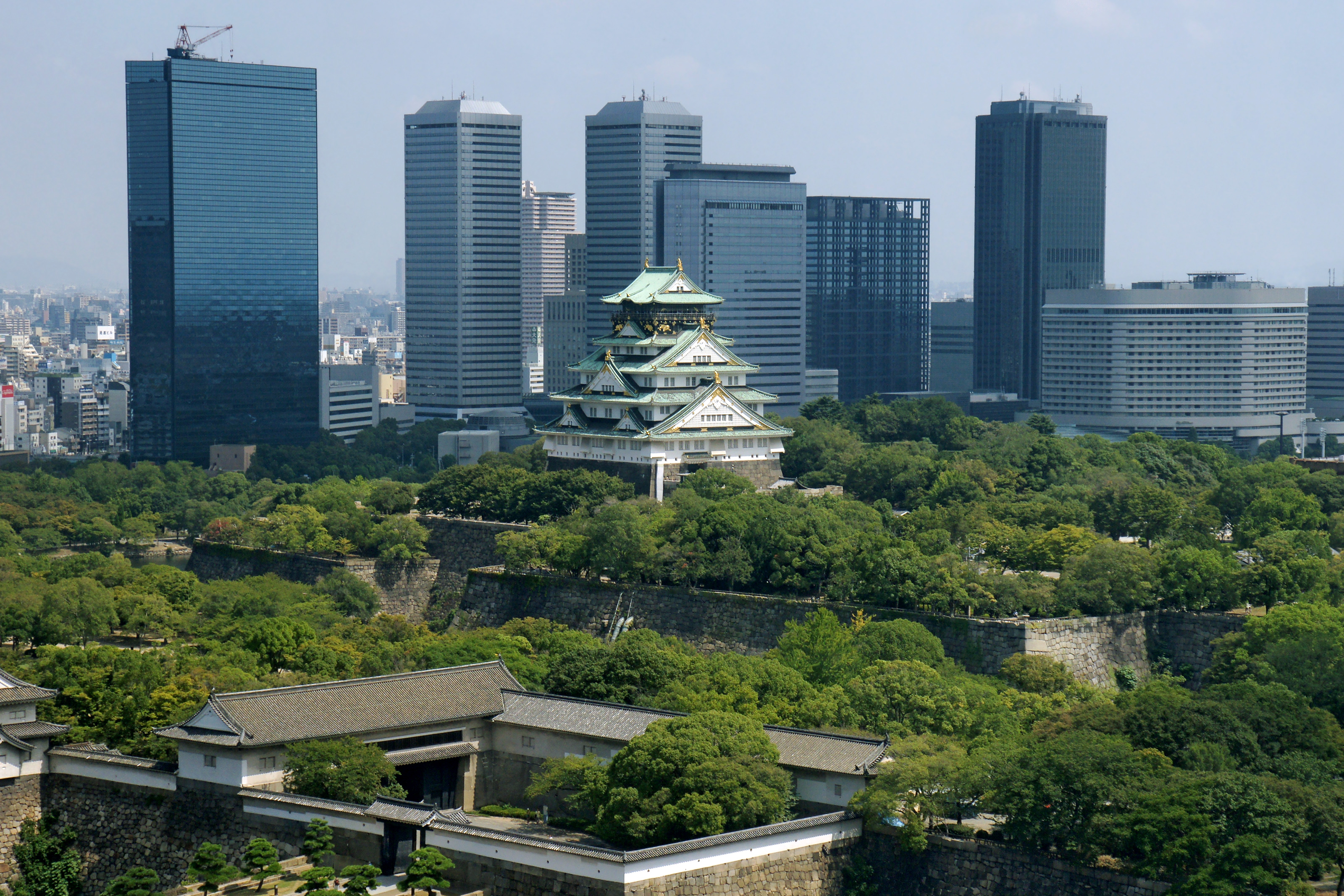
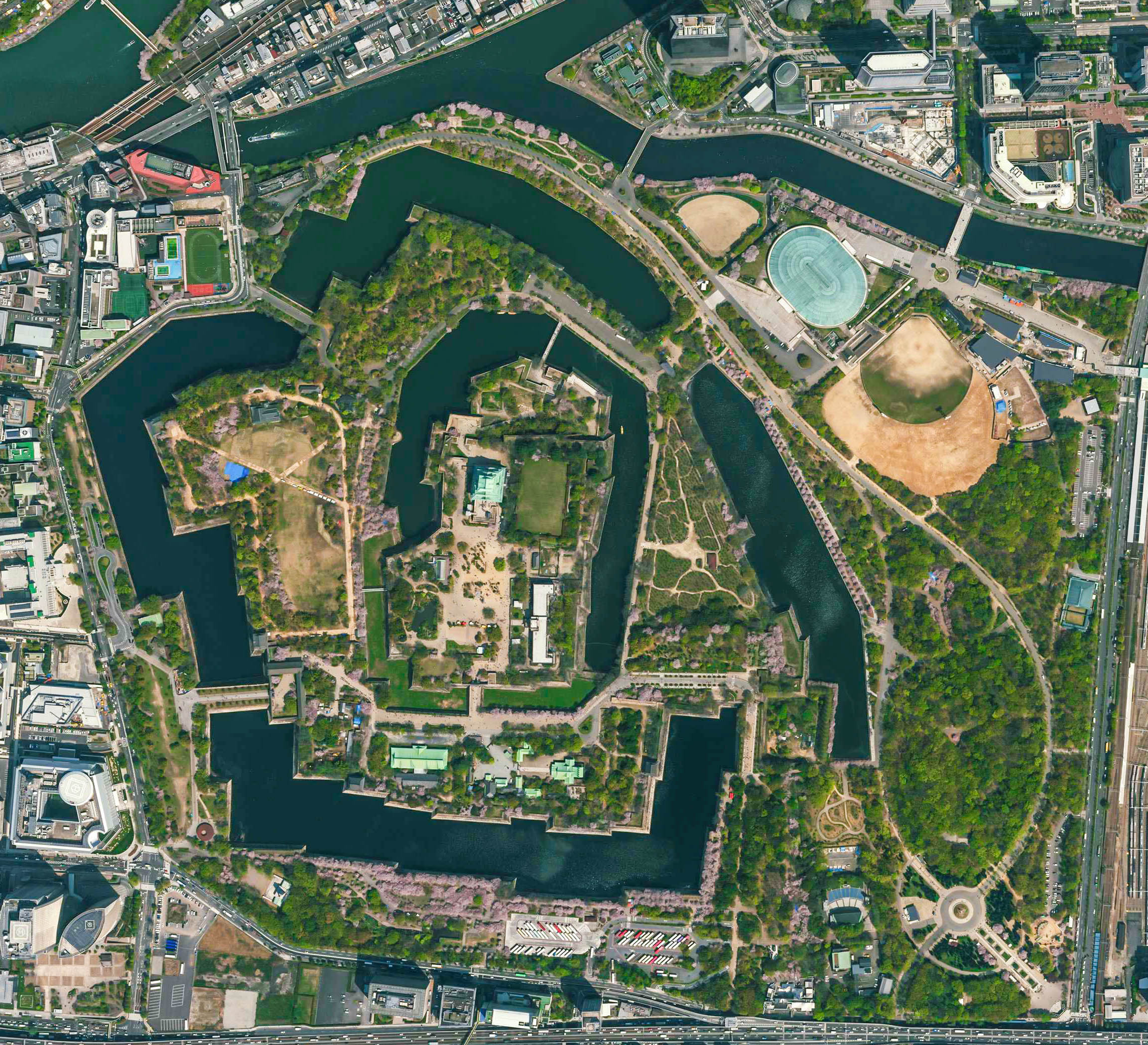
- The main keep, outer moat, and Otemon gate complex of Osaka Castle, 2009 Aerial photograph of the Osaka Castle in 2017

Site information
- Type: Azuchi-Momoyama castle

Site history
- Built: 1583, 1931 (main keep)
- Built by: Toyotomi Hideyoshi
- In use: 1583–1945

Main tower in 2024

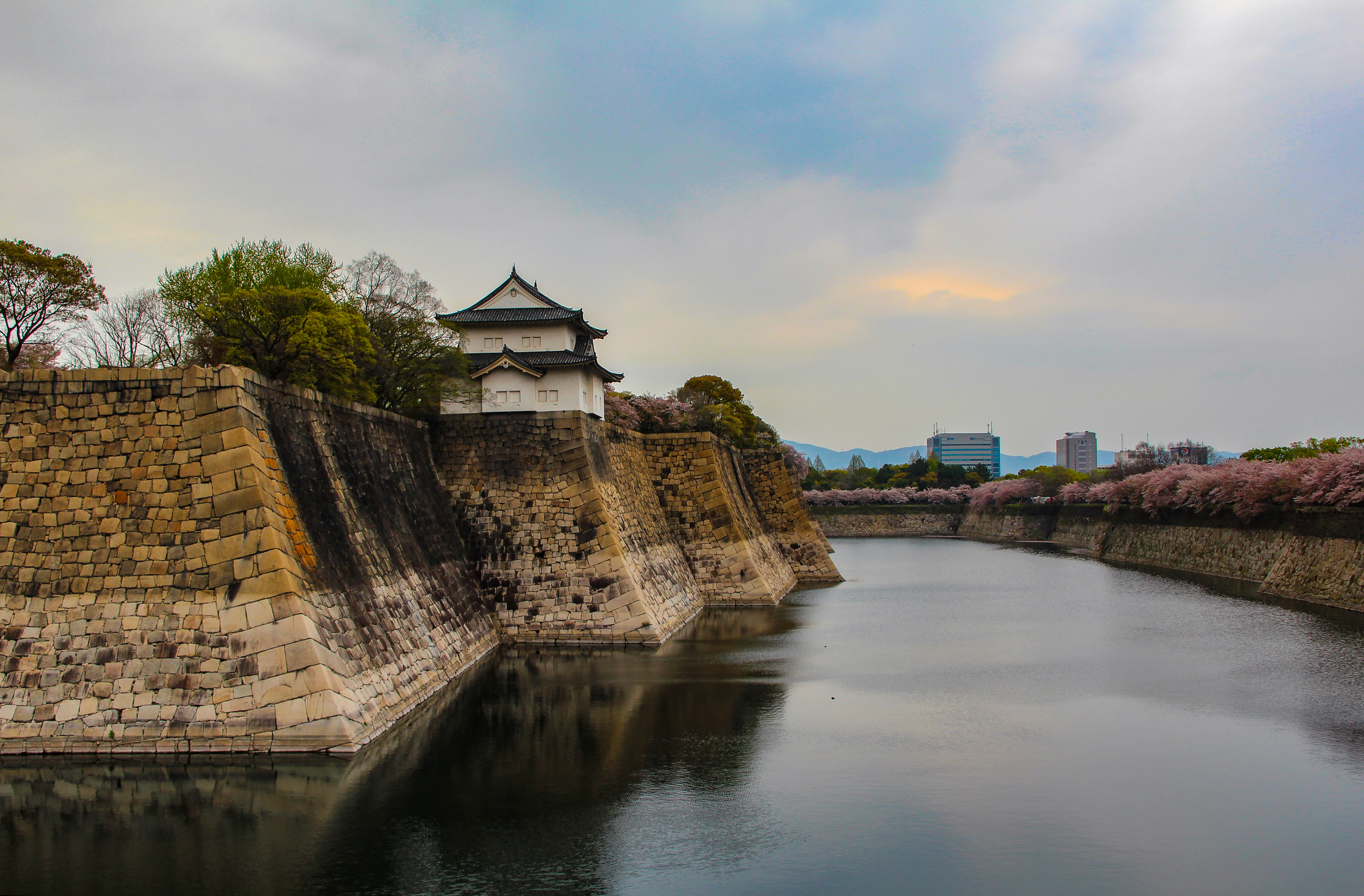
Outer moat of Osaka Castle

Osaka Castle (Japanese: 大坂城 or 大阪城, Hepburn: Ōsaka-jō) is a Japanese castle in Chūō-ku, Osaka, Japan. The castle is one of Japan's most famous landmarks and played a major role in the unification of Japan during the sixteenth century of the Azuchi–Momoyama period.

== Layout ==
The inner keep of Osaka Castle is situated on a plot of land roughly one square kilometre. It is built on two raised platforms of landfill supported by sheer walls of cut rock, using a technique called burdock piling, each overlooking a moat. The keep is five stories tall on the outside and eight on the inside, built atop a tall stone foundation to protect its occupants from attackers.

A series of moats and defensive fortifications surrounds the main keep. The castle has two moats (an inner and an outer one). The inner castle moat lies within the castle grounds and consists of two types: wet (northern-easterly) and dry (south-westerly). The outer moat, meanwhile, surrounds the entire castle and denotes its outer limits, consisting of four water-filled sections, each representing a cardinal direction (North, East, South, West).

The castle grounds, which cover approximately 61,000 square metres (15 acres), contain the following thirteen structures that were denoted as "important cultural assets" by the Japanese government:

- Ote-mon Gate
- Sakura-mon Gate
- Ichiban-yagura Turret
- Inui-yagura Turret
- Rokuban-yagura Turret
- Sengan Turret
- Tamon Turret
- Kinmeisui Well
- Kinzo Storehouse
- Enshogura Gunpowder Magazine
- Three sections of 'dobei' mud-and-plaster wall, all located around the Otemon Gate; each has its own Important Cultural Property status

There are also some megaliths at the castle, including the Octopus stone, but these have no cultural property status. The outer moat has two main sentry checkpoints: the Aoyamon Gate (in the north-east) and the Otemon Gate (in the opposing south-west).

Between the inner and outer moat are the following: Fushimi-yagura Turret Remains, Ensho-gura Gunpowder Storehouse, Osaka Geihinkan, Hoshoan Tea House, Osaka Castle Nishinomaru Garden, Sengan-yagura Turret, Tamon-yagura Turret, Remains of Taiko-yagura Turret, Osaka Shudokan Martial Arts Hall, Hokoku Shrine (Osaka), Ichiban-yagura Turret (The first turret), and Plum Grove.

There are two places to cross the inner moat: Gokuraku-bashi Bridge (located in the North) and Sakuramon Gate (the main sentry point in the South).

Within the inner moat, the castle was divided into two major areas: the Hommaru (Inner Bailey) and the Yamazato-Maru Bailey. Located within the Hommaru is the Main Tower, the Kimmeisui Well, the Japanese Garden, the Takoishi (Octopus Stone), the Gimmeisui Well, the Miraiza Osakajo Complex, the Kinzo Treasure House, and the "Timecapsule Expo'70". While within the Yamazato-Maru, Bailey consists of the Marked-Stones Square, and the Monument commemorating 'Hideyori and Yodo-dono committing suicide'.

As with almost all Japanese castles from the Azuchi-Momoyama period onward, the tenshu (天守, main keep), the most prominent structure, was used as a storehouse in times of peace and as a fortified tower in times of war, and the daimyo (大名, feudal lord)'s government offices and residences were located in a group of single-story buildings near the tenshu and the surrounding yagura (櫓, turrets).

== History ==
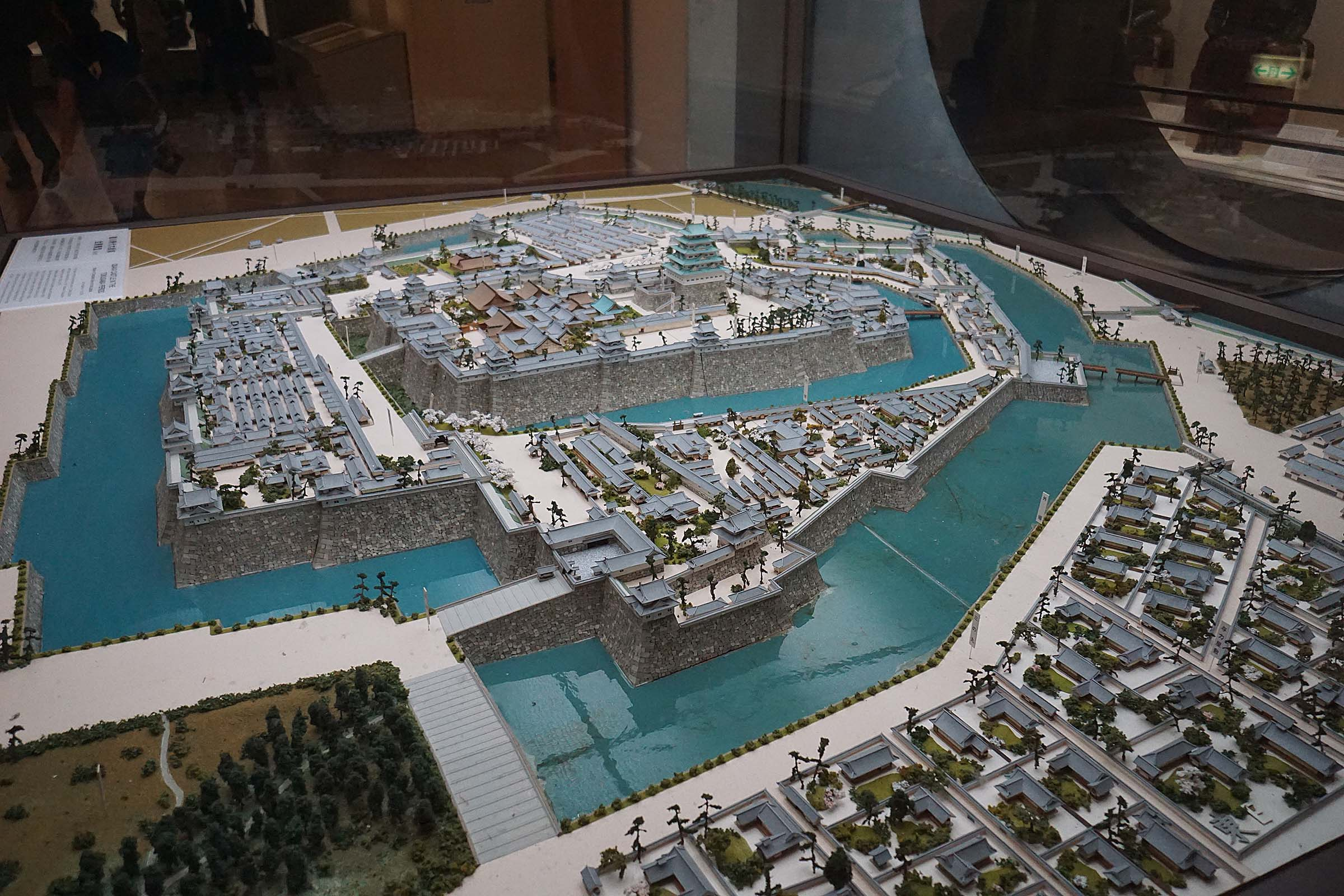
Miniature model of the castle complex after the Tokugawa rebuilding

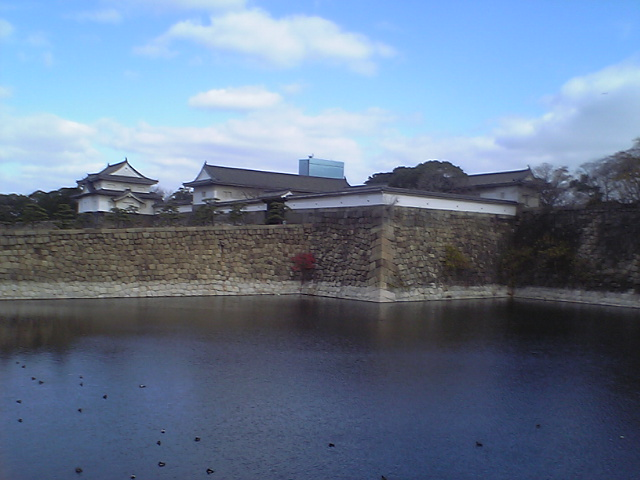
Ōte-mon Gate with moat in foreground

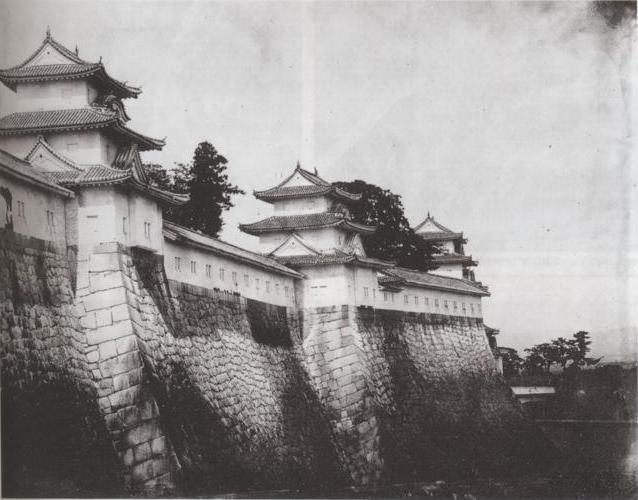
Osaka Castle rampart in 1865

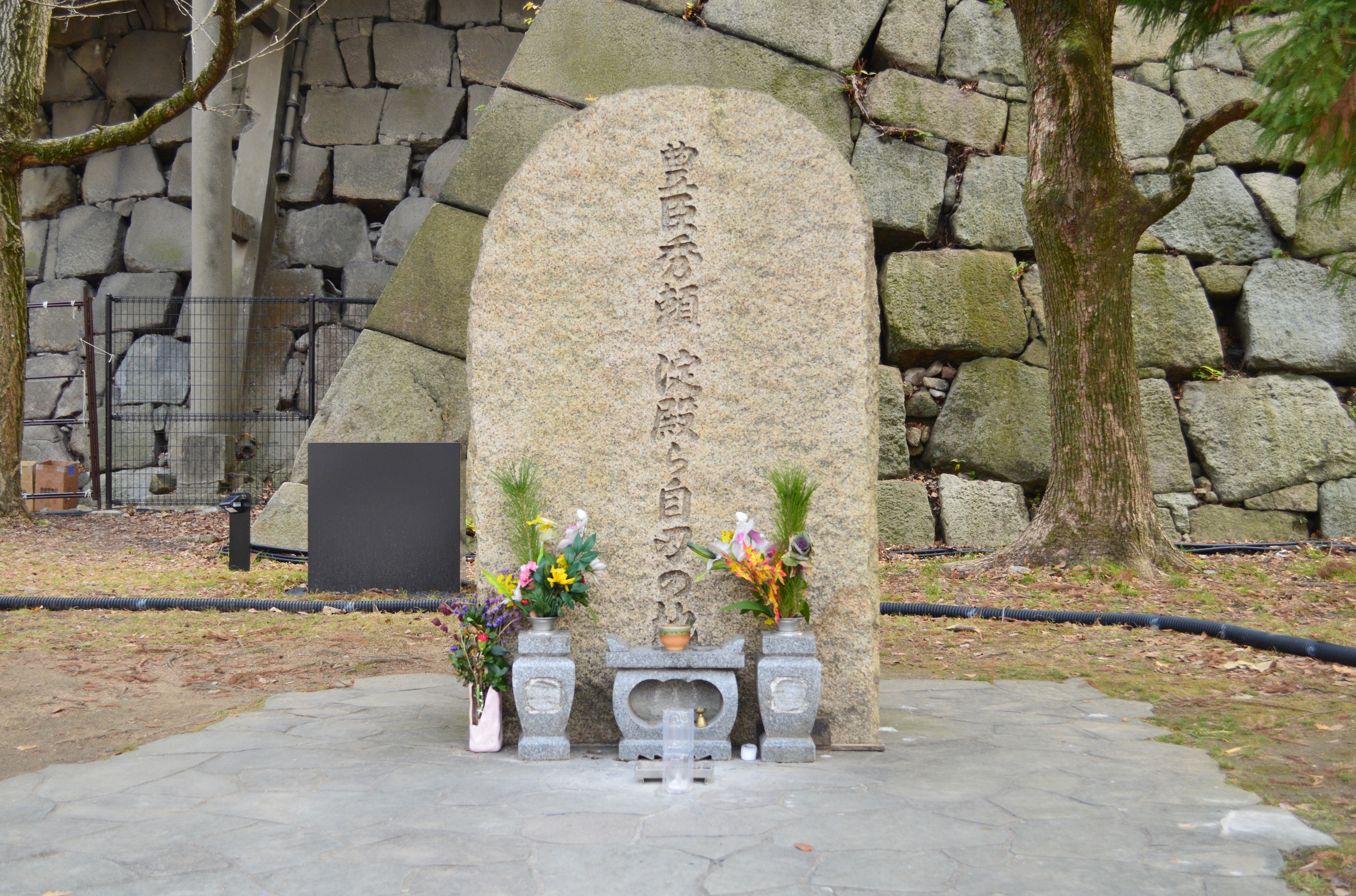
Stone marking the place where Toyotomi Hideyori and his mother, Yodo-Dono, committed suicide after the fall of Osaka Castle

In 1583 Toyotomi Hideyoshi commenced construction on the site of the Ikkō-ikki temple of Ishiyama Hongan-ji. The basic plan was modeled after Azuchi Castle, the headquarters of Oda Nobunaga. Hideyoshi wanted to build a castle that mirrored Nobunaga's but surpassed it in every way: the plan featured a five-story main tower with three extra stories underground and gold leaf on the sides to impress visitors. In 1585, the Inner donjon was completed. Hideyoshi continued to expand the castle, making it increasingly formidable to attackers. Construction was completed in 1597, and Hideyoshi died the following year. Osaka Castle passed to his son, Toyotomi Hideyori.

In 1614, Tokugawa Ieyasu besieged the Toyotomi clan forces in Osaka castle during the winter, starting the Siege of Osaka. Although the Toyotomi forces were outnumbered approximately two to one, they managed to fight off Tokugawa's 200,000-man army and protect the castle's outer walls. Ieyasu had the castle's outer moat filled, thereby negating one of its main outer defenses. During the summer of 1615, Hideyori began to restore the outer moat. Ieyasu, in outrage, sent his armies to Osaka Castle again, and routed the Toyotomi men inside the outer walls on June 4. Later, Osaka Castle fell to the Tokugawa shogunate and the Toyotomi clan perished, as Toyotomi Hideyori and Yodo-dono committed seppuku and the castle buildings burned to the ground.

As the Toyotomi clan no longer existed, the Tokugawa shogunate expressed its desire to relocate its capital to Osaka. However, this plan to relocate the shogunate to Osaka was halted after Ieyasu died in 1616. For a while, the shogunate's plan to move to Osaka was abandoned. Still, it was reinstated by Tokugawa Hidetada, who strongly desired to establish a unified imperial and military government. In 1619, Matsudaira Tadaaki, who was appointed as the lord of Osaka Castle before, was transferred to the Kōriyama Domain in Yamato Province, and the shogunate assumed direct control of Osaka. Then, the project of reconstructing Osaka castle as a new base of the shogunate was entrusted to Tōdō Takatora and Kobori Enshu. In 1620, the old structures of Osaka Castle were dismantled so that the foundation for the new castle could be built. He assigned the task of constructing new walls to individual samurai clans. The walls built in the 1620s still stand today and are made out of interlocked granite boulders without mortar. Many of the stones were brought from rock quarries near the Seto Inland Sea and bear inscribed crests of the various families who contributed them. The shogunate also built a new elevated central tower, five stories on the outside and eight stories on the inside. Construction of the tenshu started in 1628 and was completed two years later, about the same time as the rest of the reconstruction, and followed the general layout of the original Toyotomi structure. However, it was built in a different part of the Honmaru (main bailey), as the base of the Toyotomi keep had actually been buried by the new Tokugawa version of the castle. After a long period of construction, the new Osaka Castle was completed in 1628.

In 1660, lightning ignited the gunpowder warehouse, and the resulting explosion set the castle on fire. In 1665, lightning struck and burnt down the tenshu.

Kajisuke Nakama was one of the hatamoto guards who protected Osaka Castle. On 15 May 1740, when he was 25 years old, he stole 4,000 ryō of gold inside. However, the crime was soon discovered by the shogunate, so he was arrested and confessed. Although he was a samurai, he was dragged around the city and sentenced to crucifixion in September. Later, this incident became a legend and the contents changed, so it is said that he was a thief who wanted the gold that Toyotomi Hideyoshi had dropped in the Kinmeisui Well.

In 1843, after decades of neglect, the castle got much-needed repairs when the bakufu collected money from the people of the region to rebuild several of the turrets.

In 1868, Osaka Castle fell and was surrendered to anti-bakufu imperial loyalists. A number of the castle buildings were burned in the civil conflicts surrounding the Meiji Restoration. The Honmaru Palace was lost during the Boshin War. In its place the Kishū Palace (紀州御殿 Kishū Goten) was moved here from Wakayama Castle to serve as an imperial state guest house, named later Tenrinkaku.

Under the Meiji government, Osaka Castle became part of the Osaka Army Arsenal (Osaka Hohei Kosho), manufacturing guns, ammunition, and explosives for Japan's rapidly expanding Western-style military.

The main keep of Osaka Castle being built in 1931

In 1931, the ferroconcrete tenshu was built.

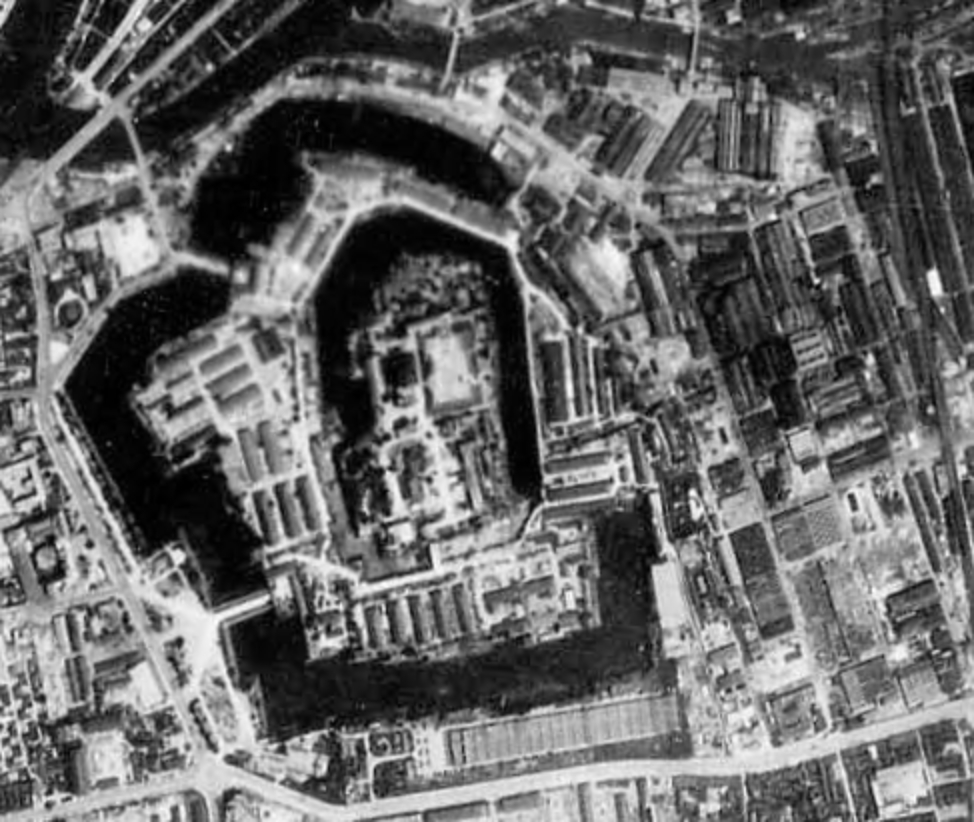
Osaka castle grounds serving as a part of the Osaka Army Arsenal, June 1945

During World War II, the arsenal became one of the largest military armories, employing 60,000 workers. American bombing raids targeting the arsenal damaged the reconstructed main keep and, on August 14, 1945, destroyed 90% of the arsenal and killed 382 people working there.

In 1995, Osaka's government approved yet another restoration project, aiming to restore the main keep to its Edo-era splendor. In 1997, restoration was completed. The keep is a concrete reproduction (including elevators) of the original, and the interior is intended as a modern, functioning museum.

Located in the Nishinomaru was the former residence of the jōdai, who were officials. The residence was the second largest after the Honmaru Palace. North of it were several warehouses. The site is now a park. Next to it is the Osaka State Guest House and the Hōshō-an chashitsu.

== Views of the castle ==
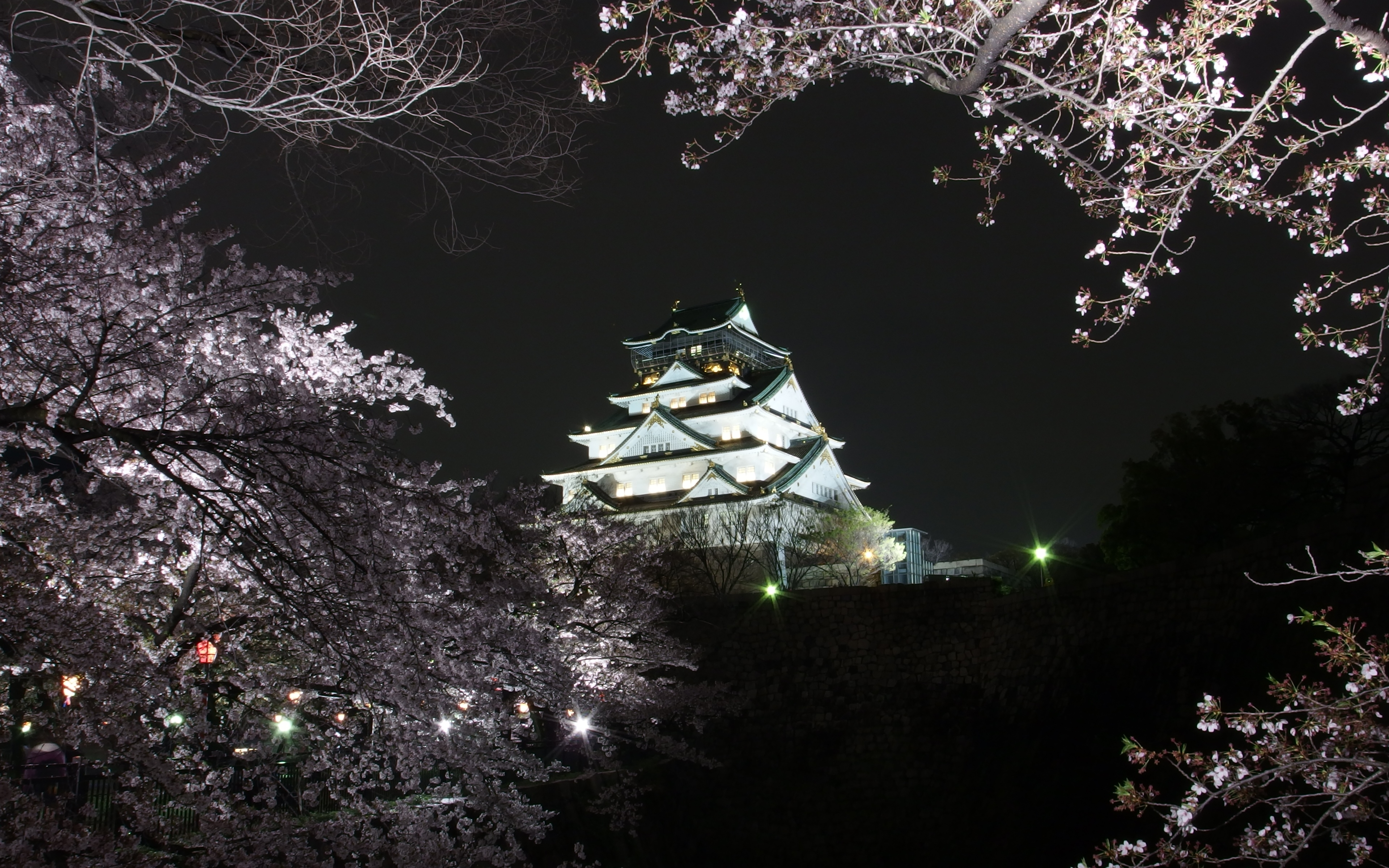
Osaka Castle at night

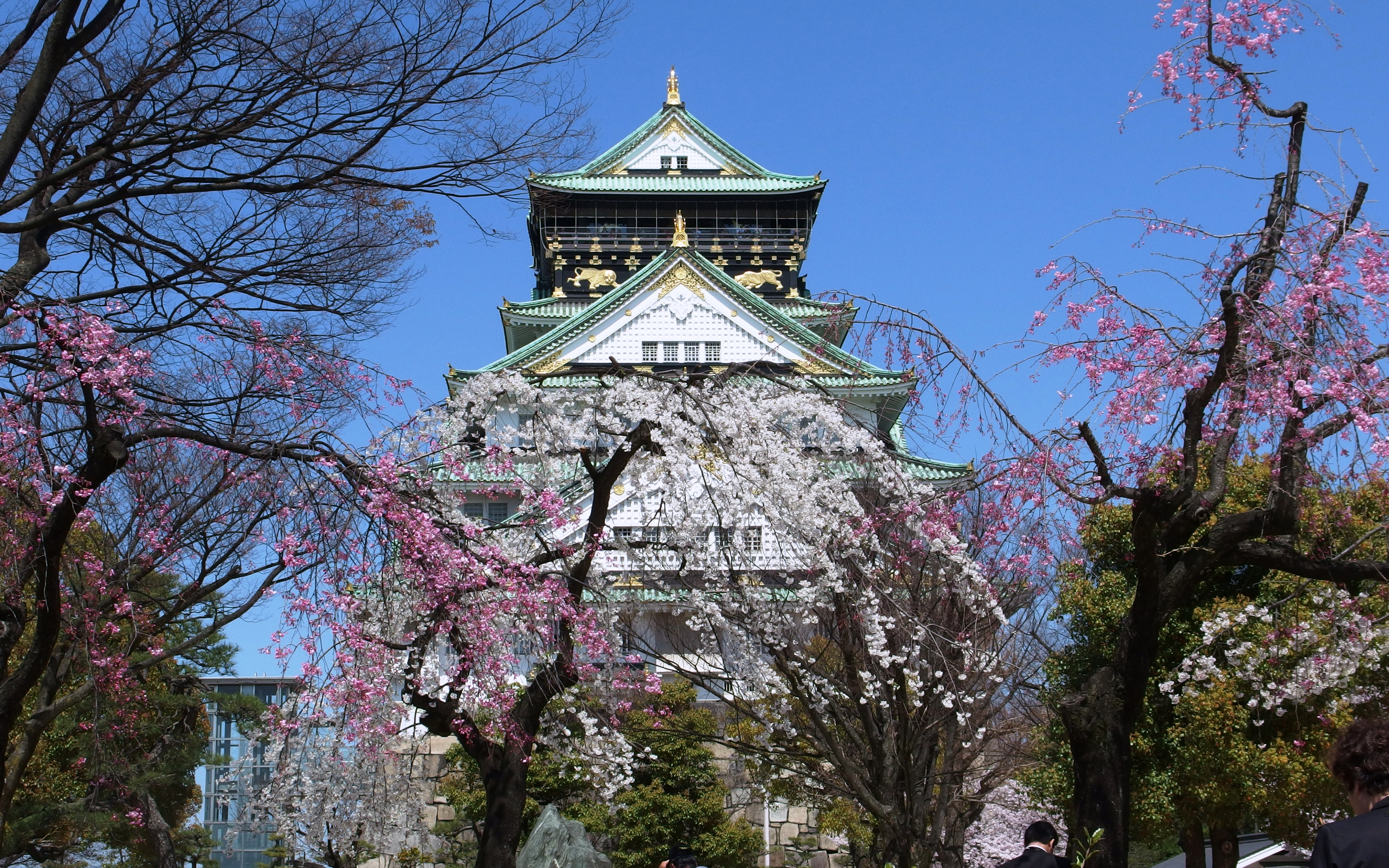
Osaka Castle pedestrian entrance

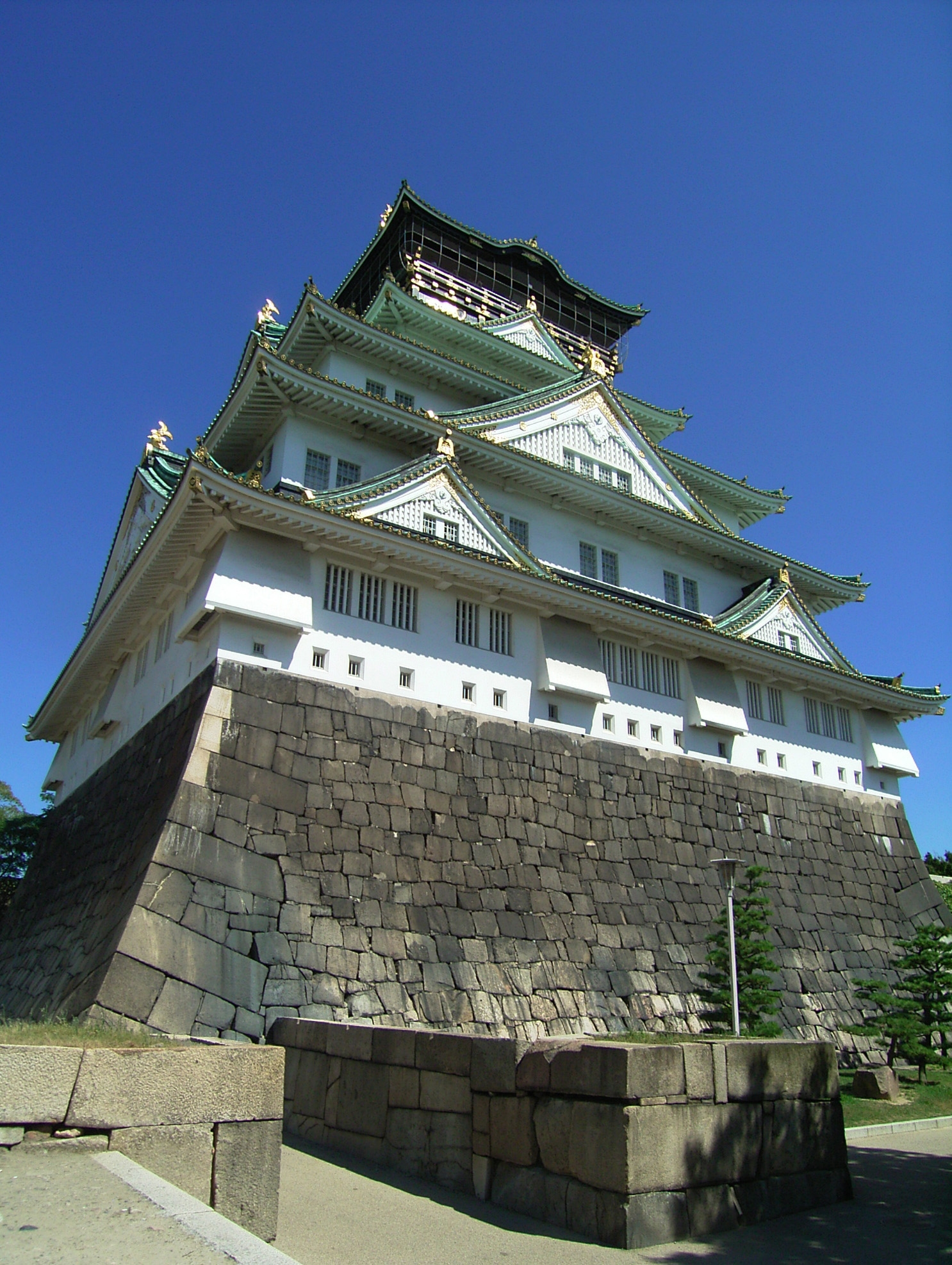
Main keep

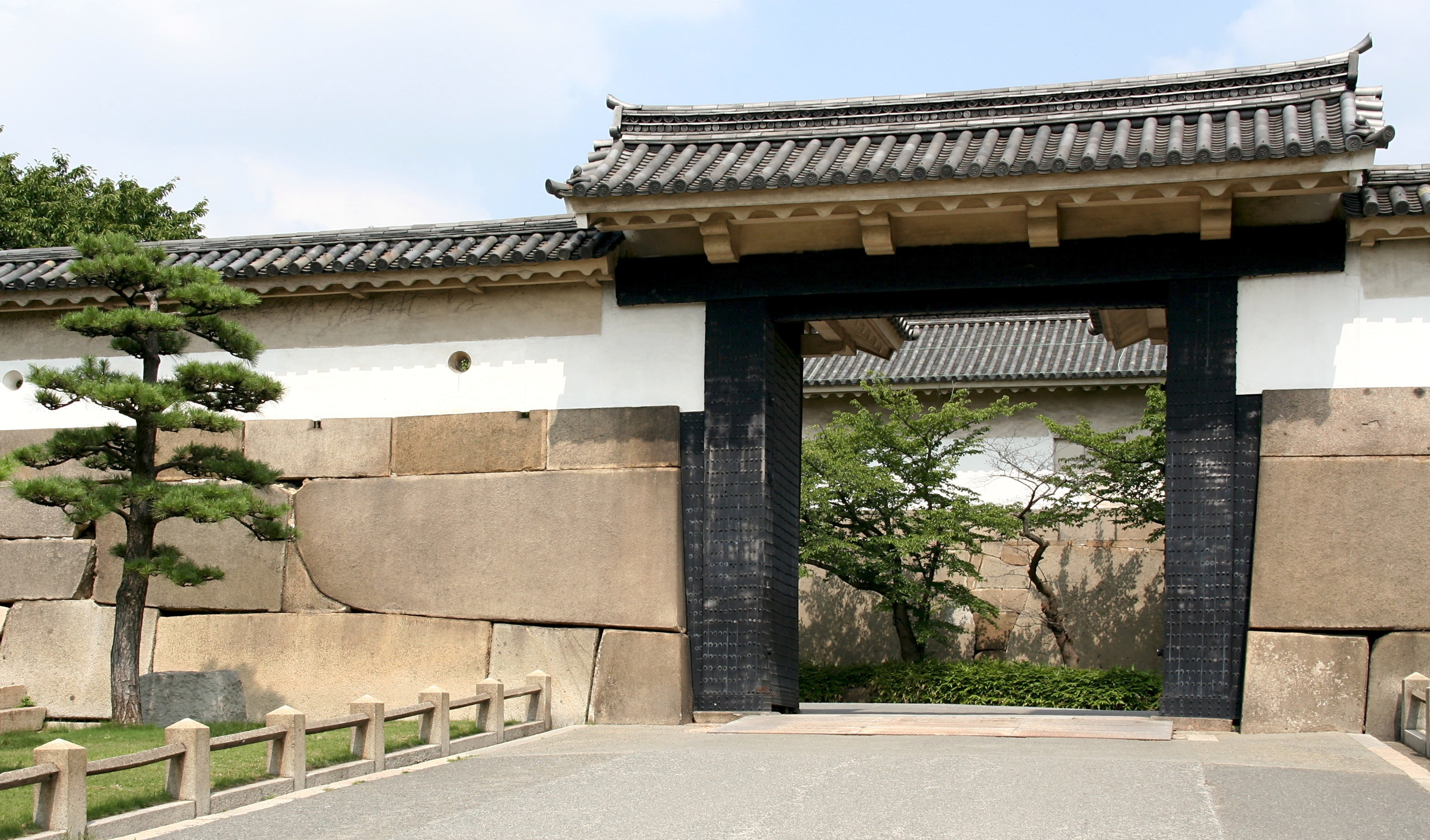
Otemon (western) Gate

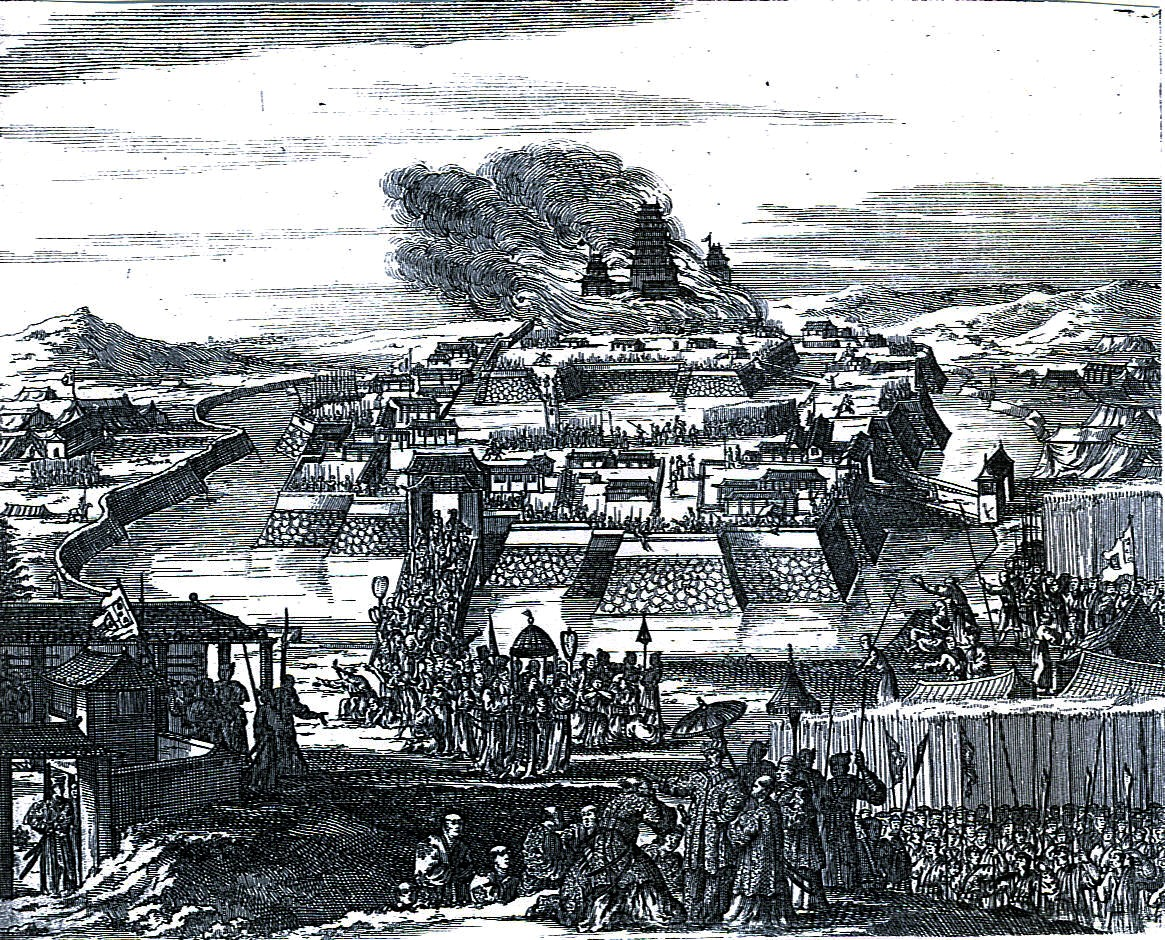
Early representation of the destruction of the 1663 François Caron book

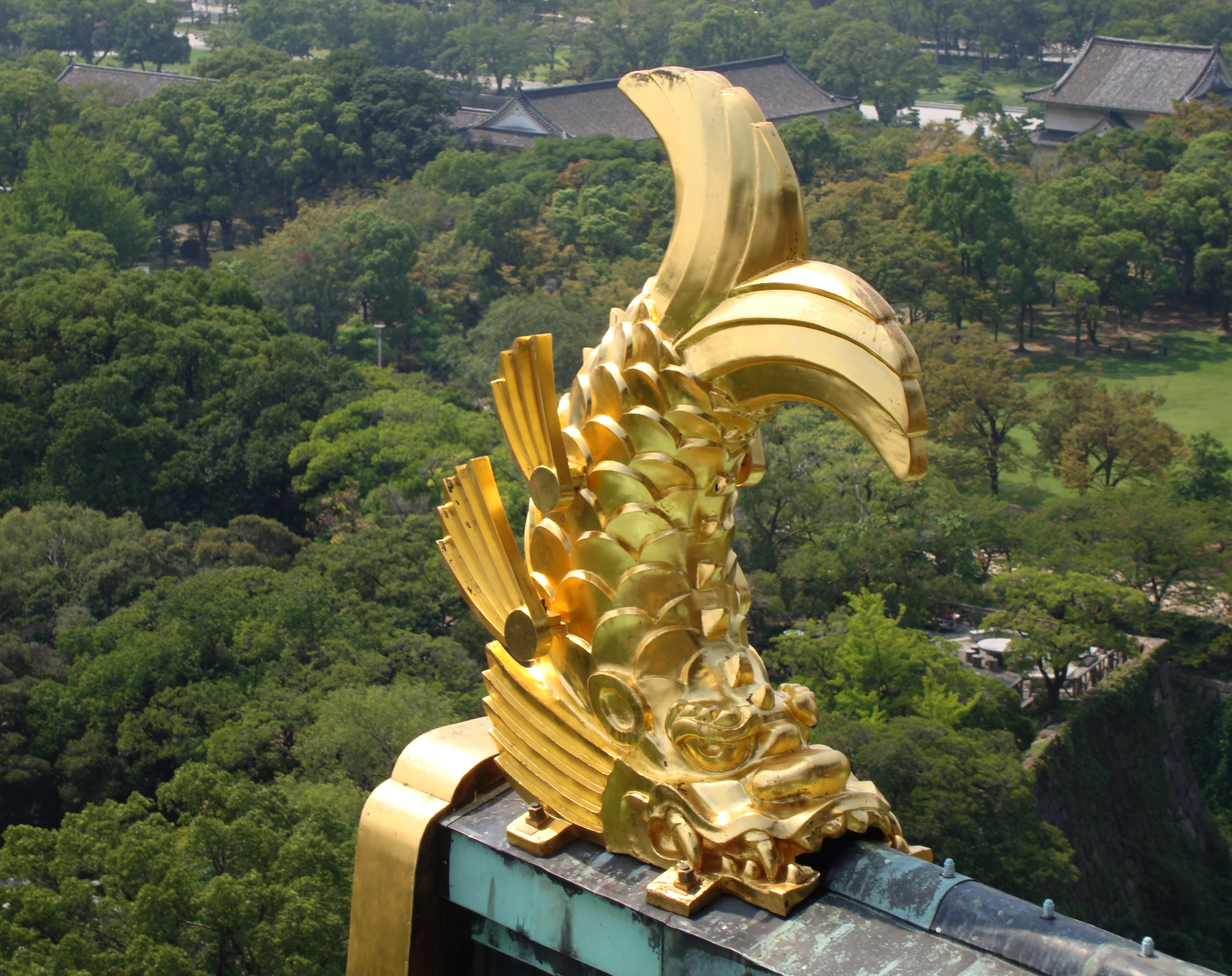
From the roof of Osaka Castle main tower

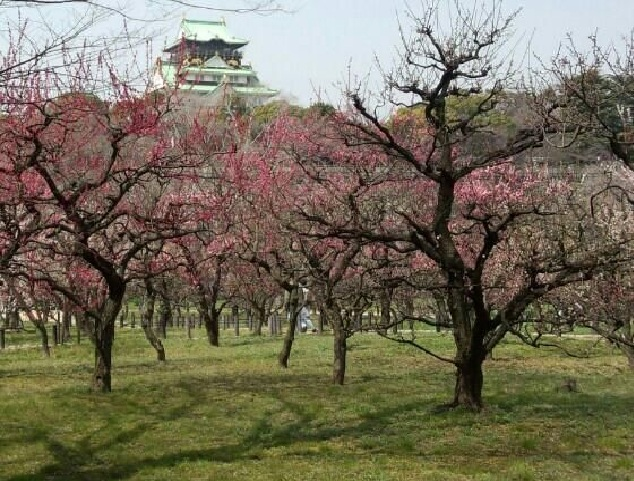
Prunus mume grove in Osaka Castle Park

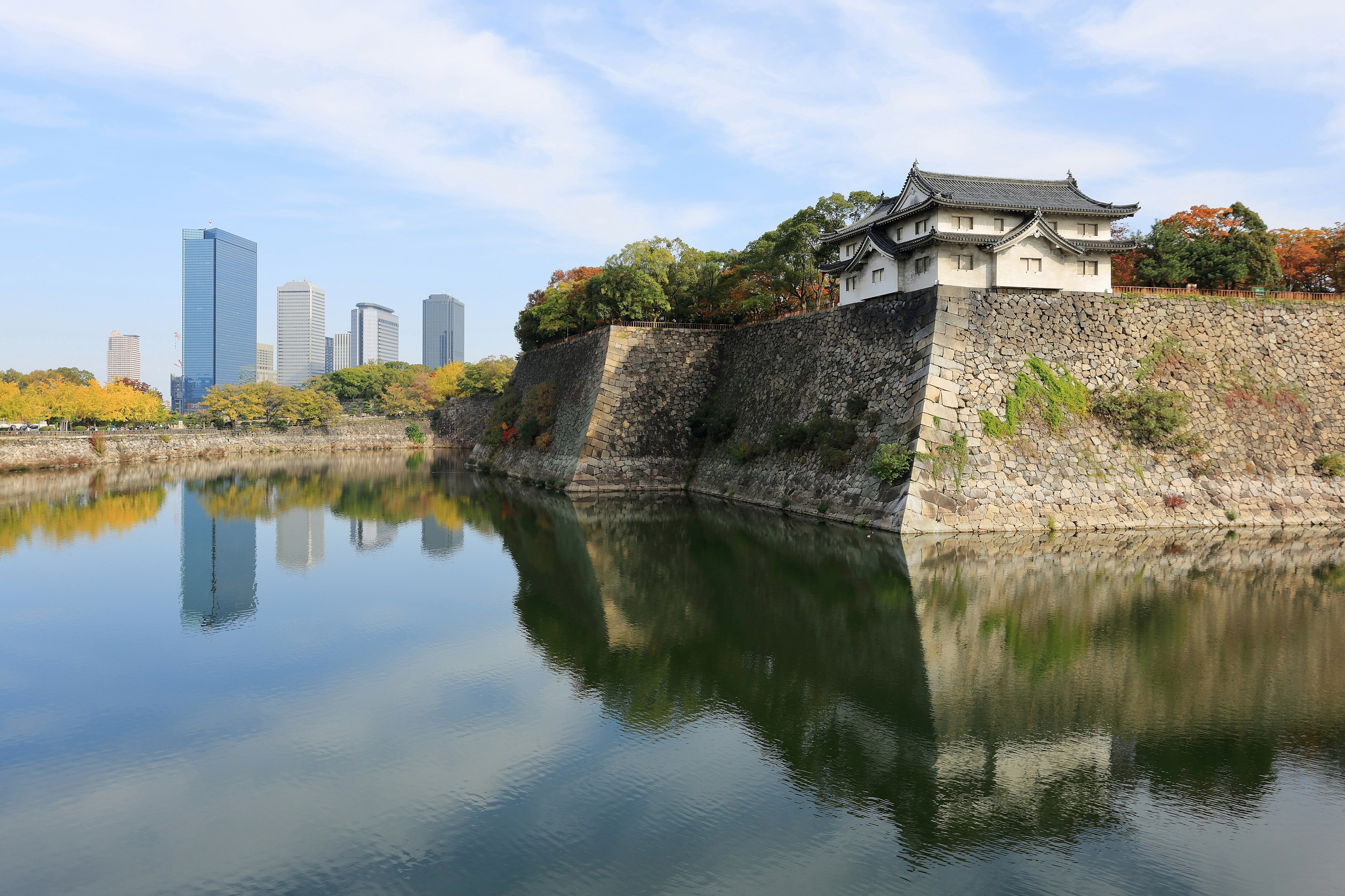
Outer moat and Osaka Business Park

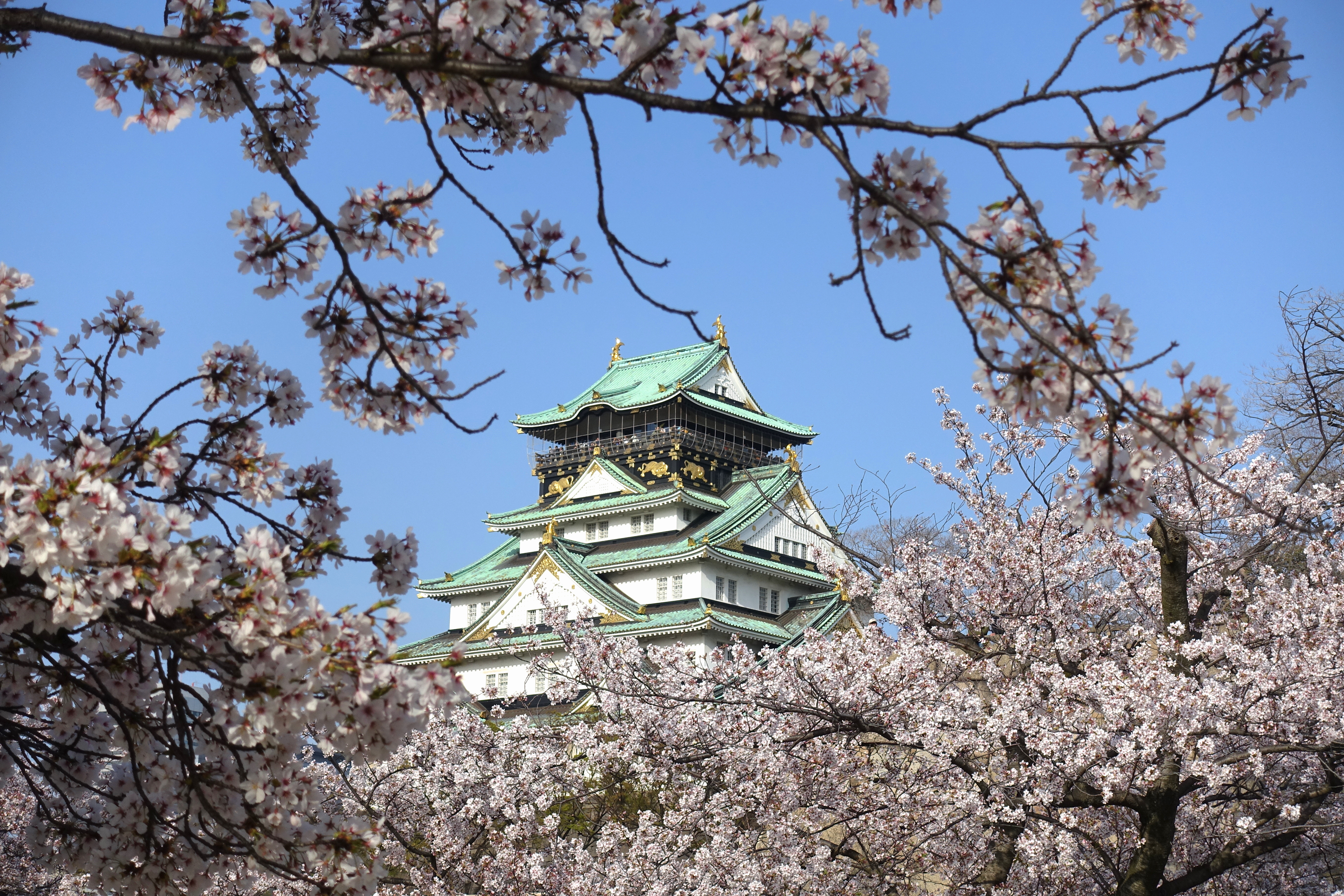
Cherry blossom at Osaka Castle

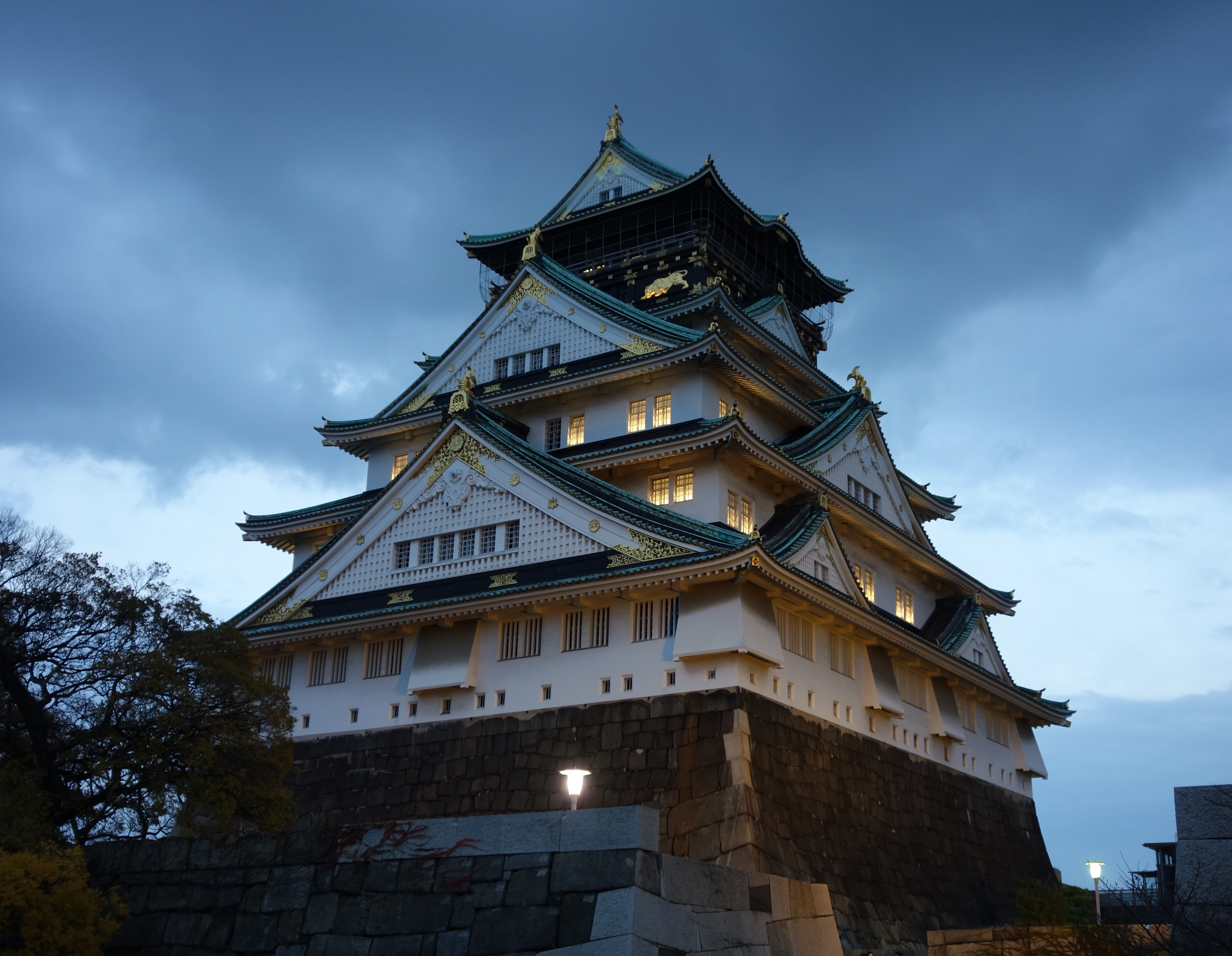
Osaka Castle during twilight

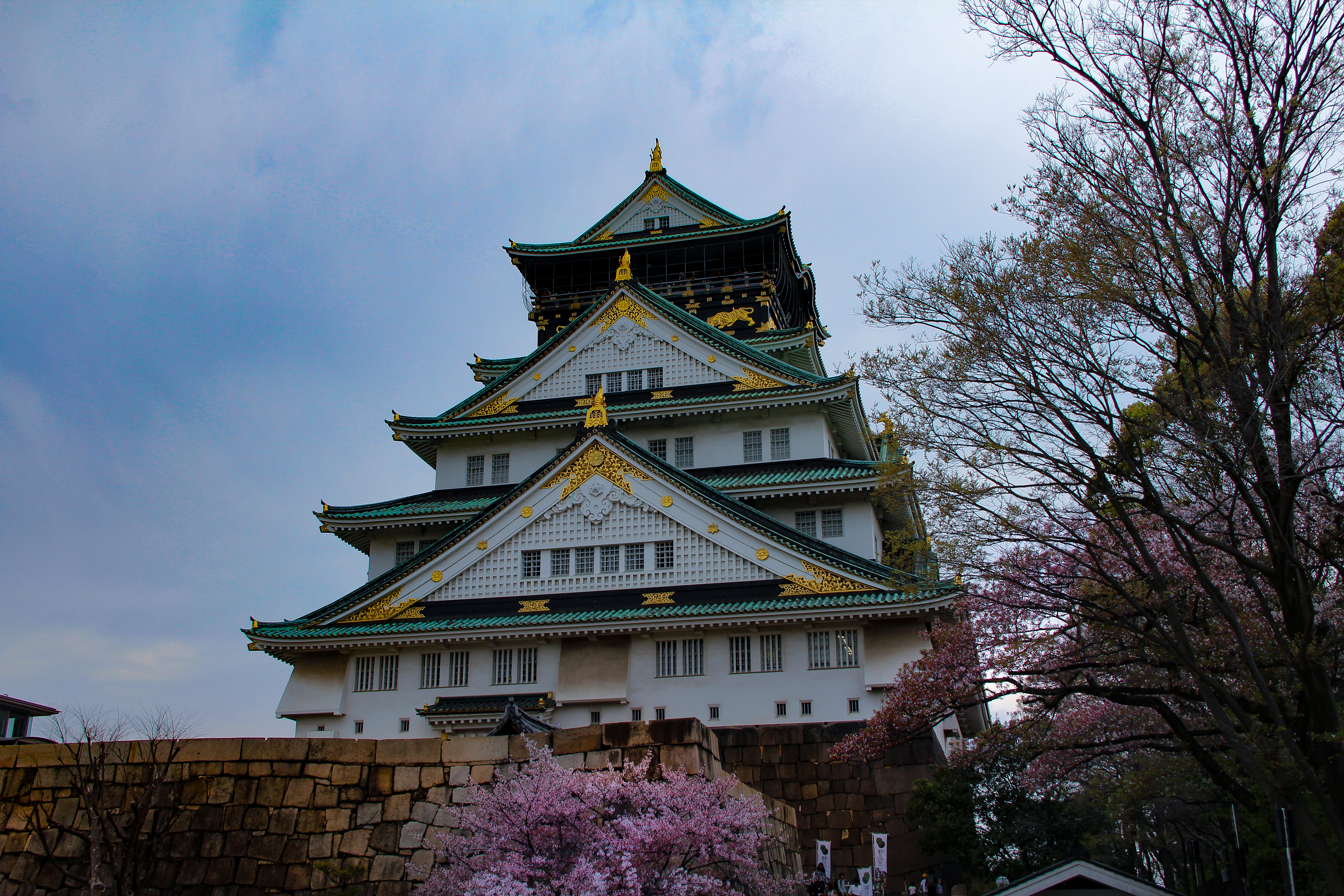
Tenshu of Osaka Castle

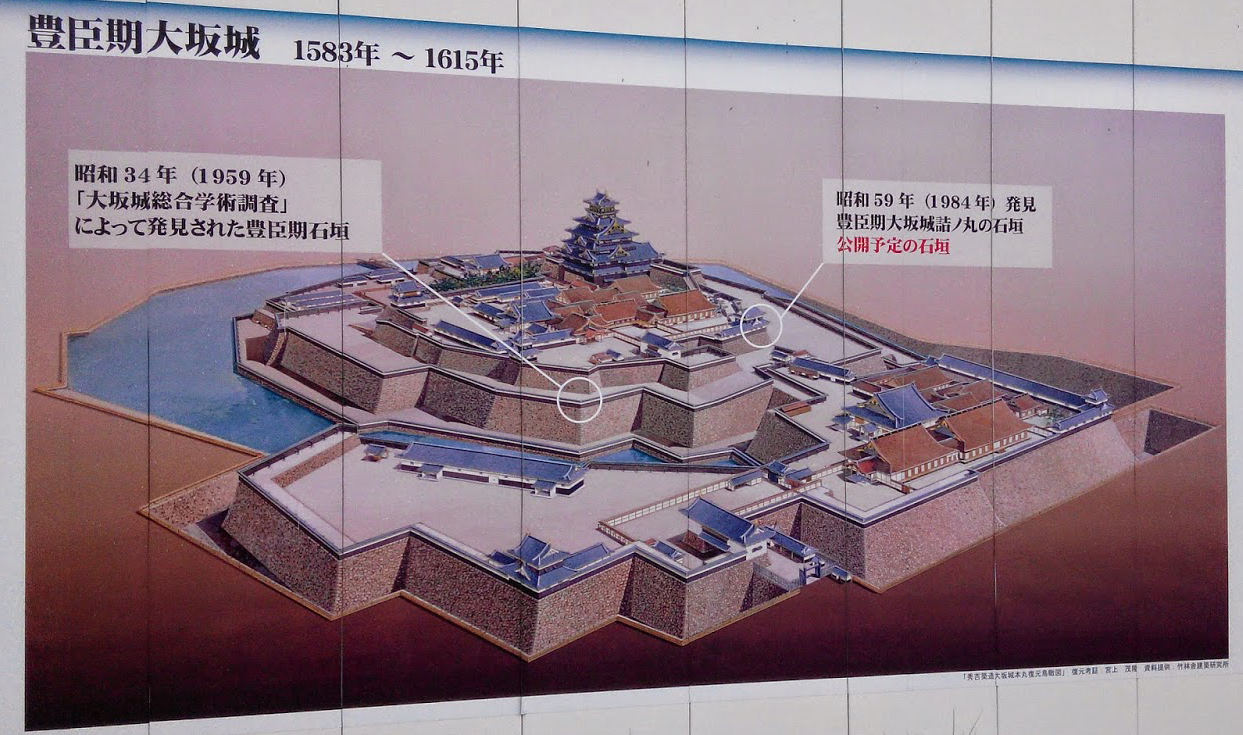
Osaka Castle from 1583 until 1615

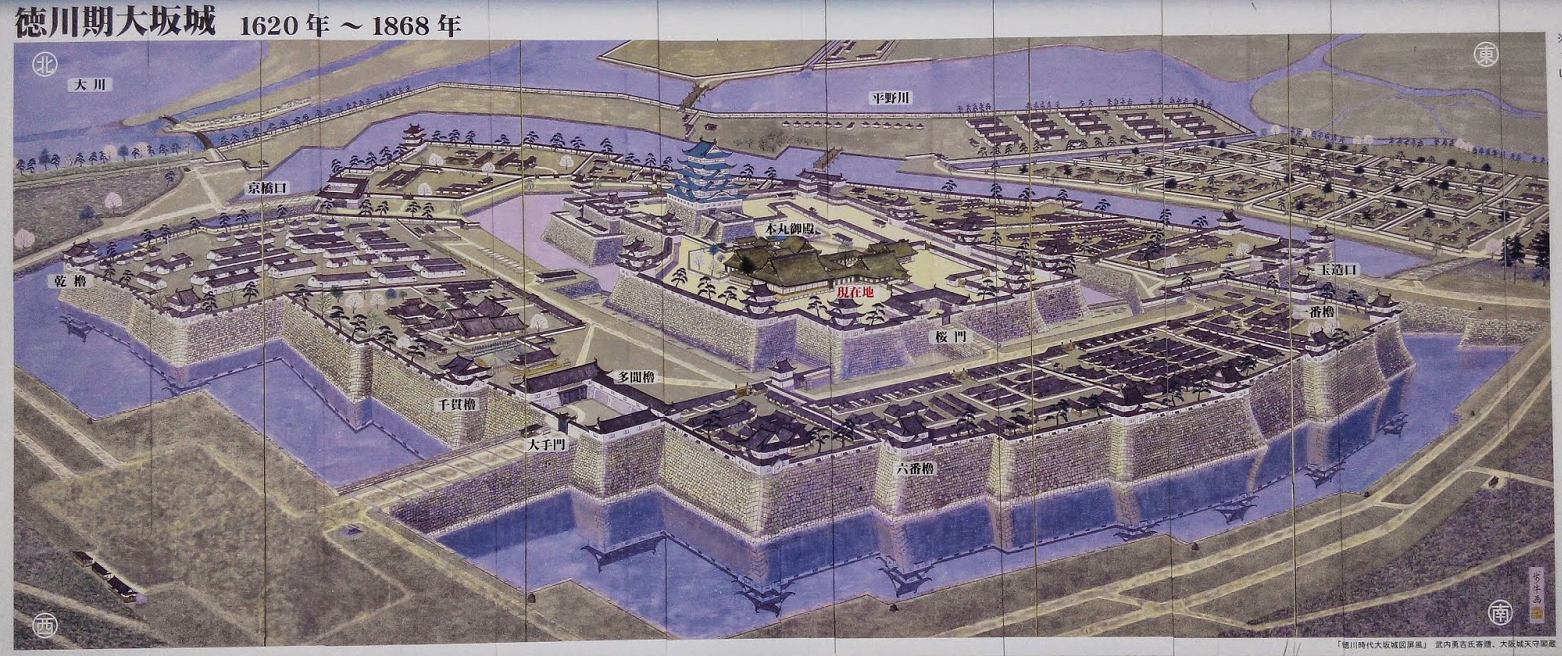
Osaka Castle from 1620 until 1868

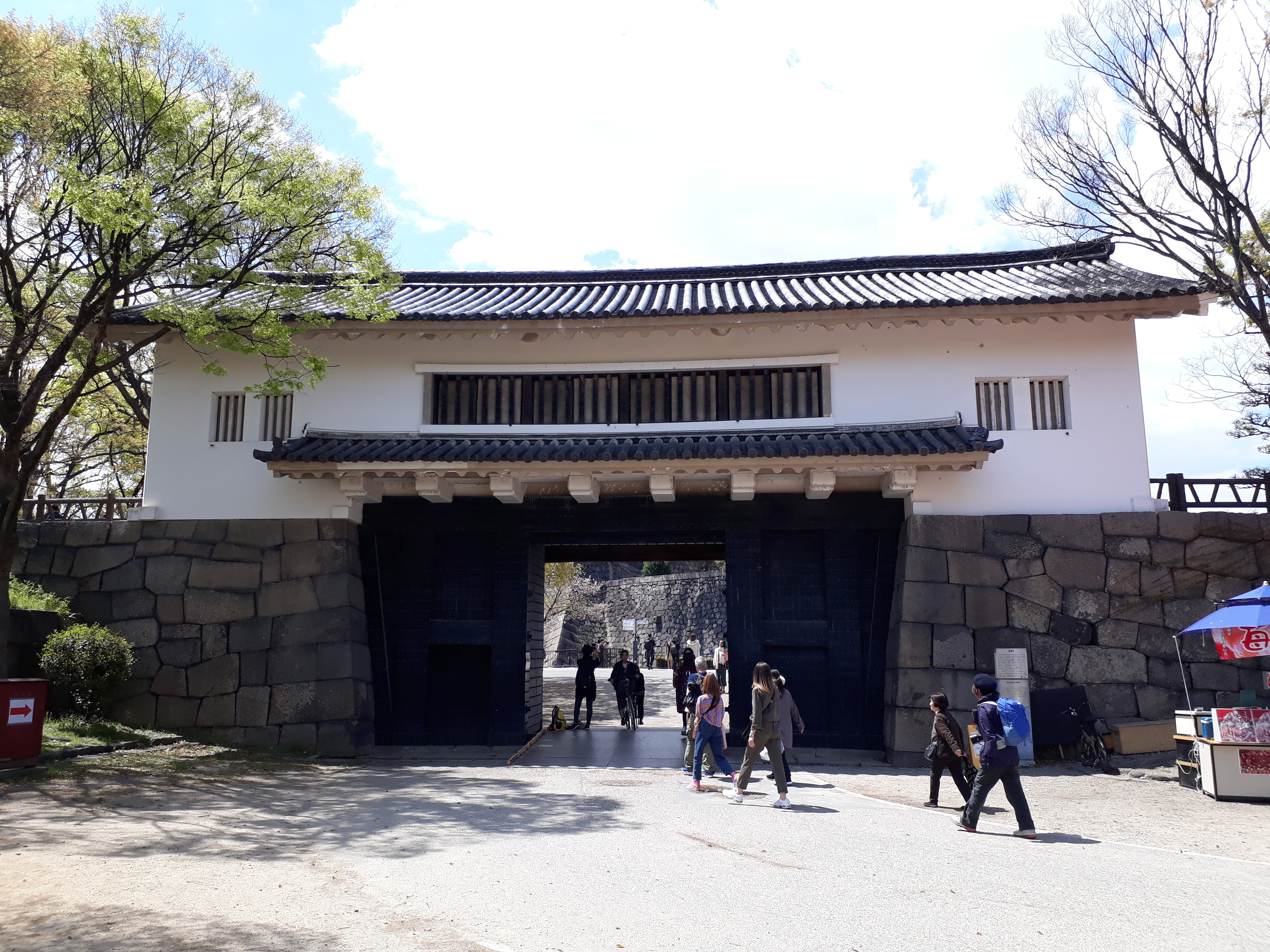
Outer-View of Aoyamon Gate

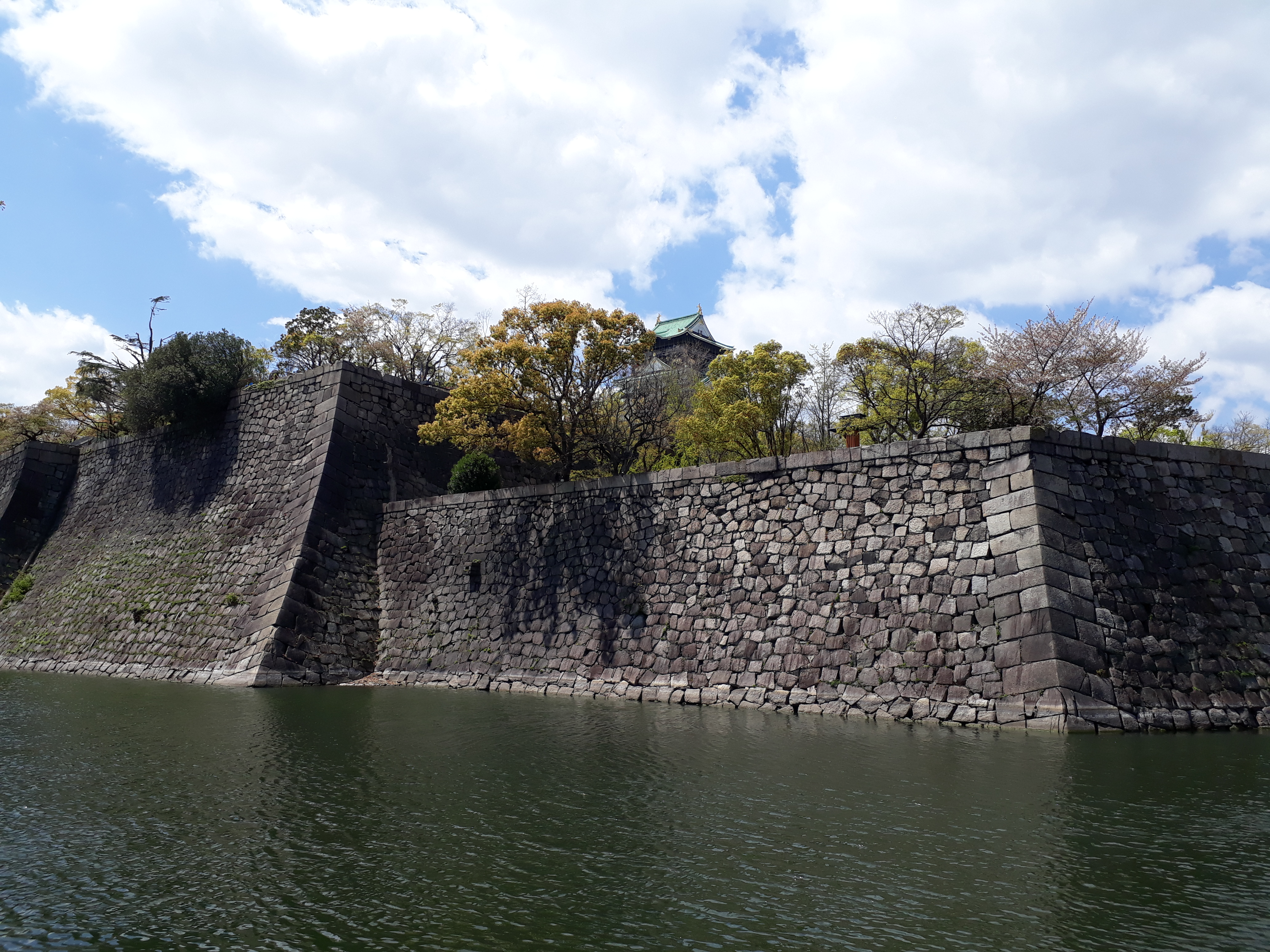
Inner moat ramparts viewed from inner Aoyamon Gate

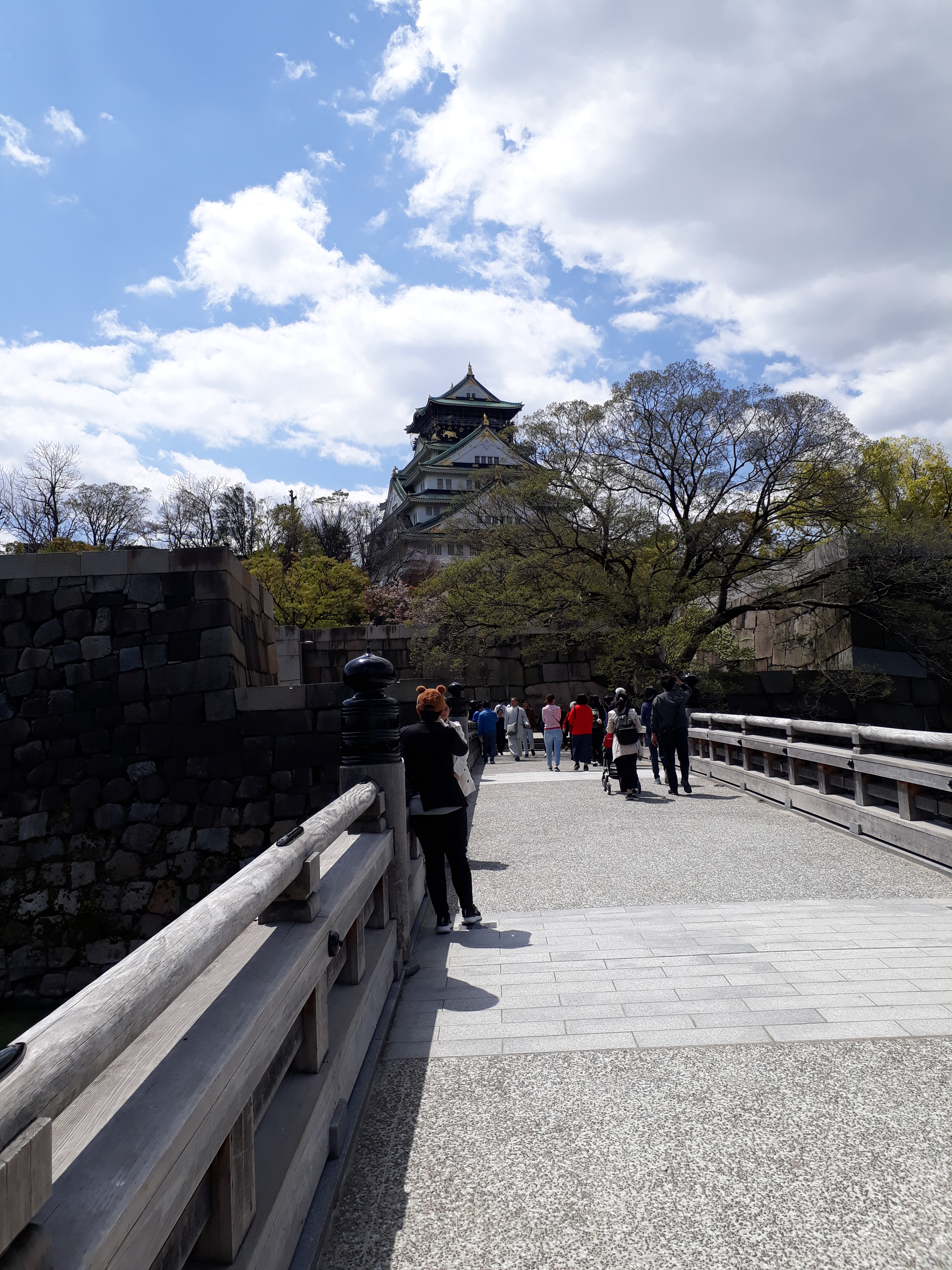
Main keep from Gokuraku Bashi (bridge)

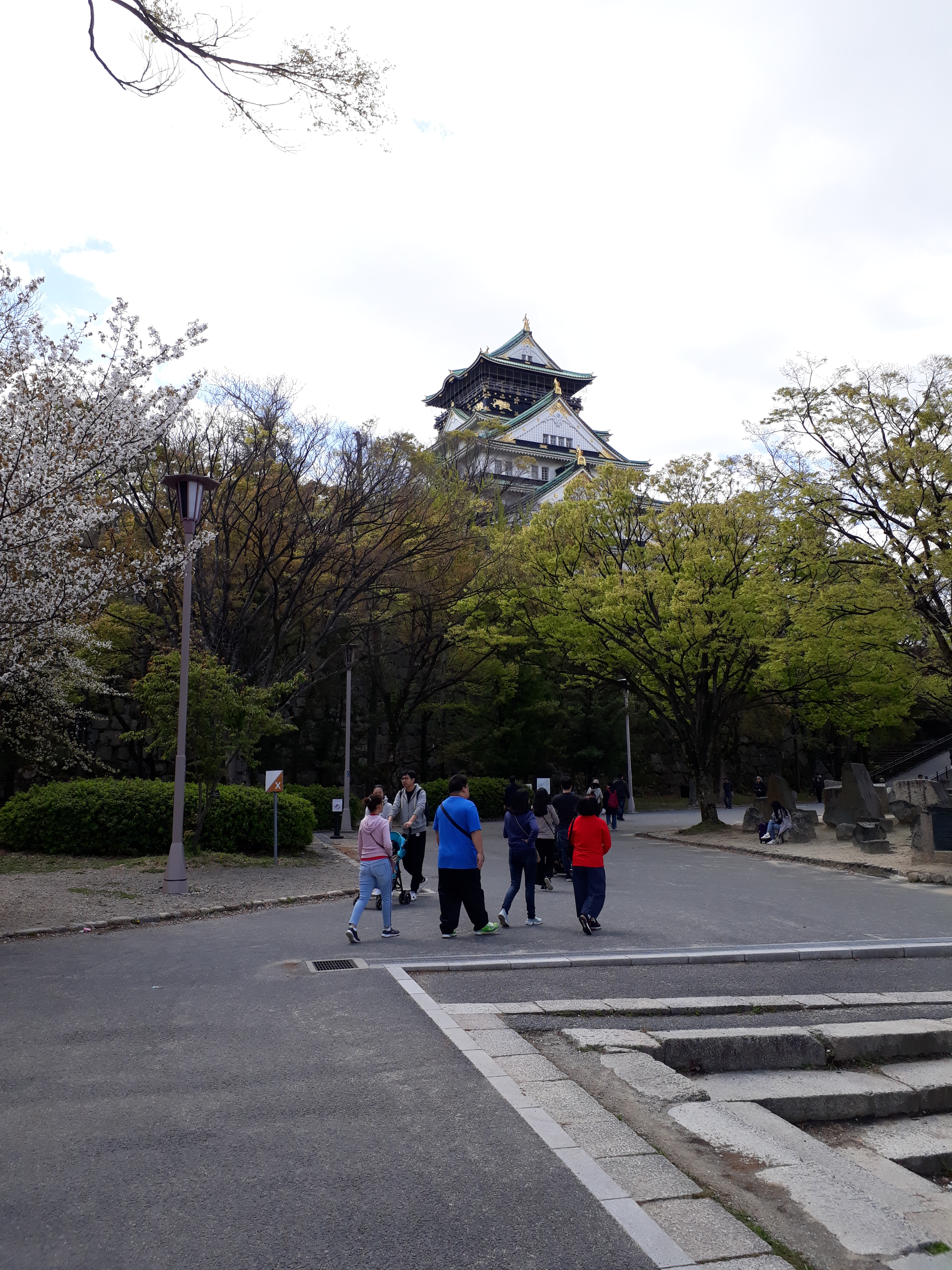
Main keep from Marked Stone Square

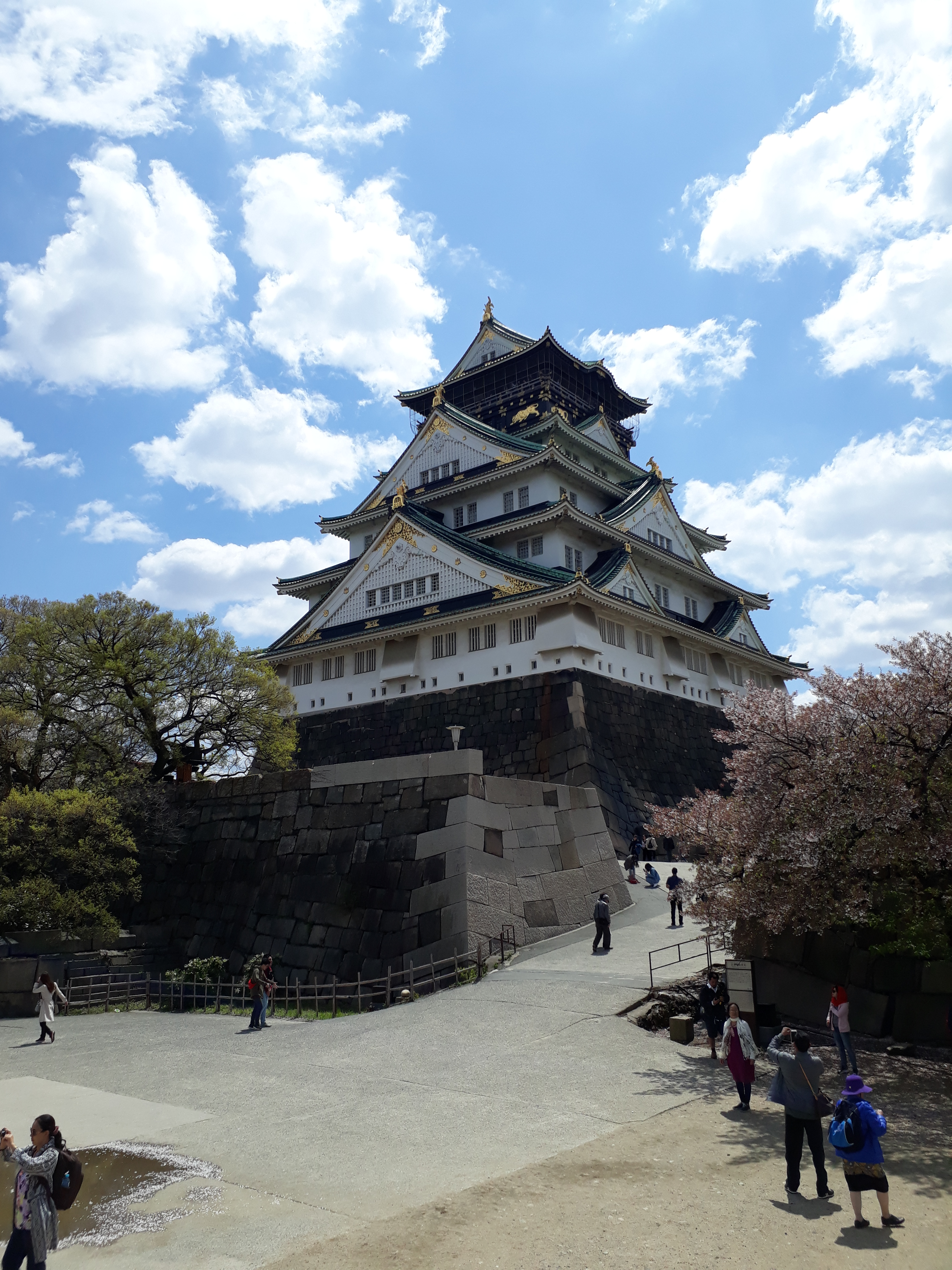
Main keep from Uzumimon Gate

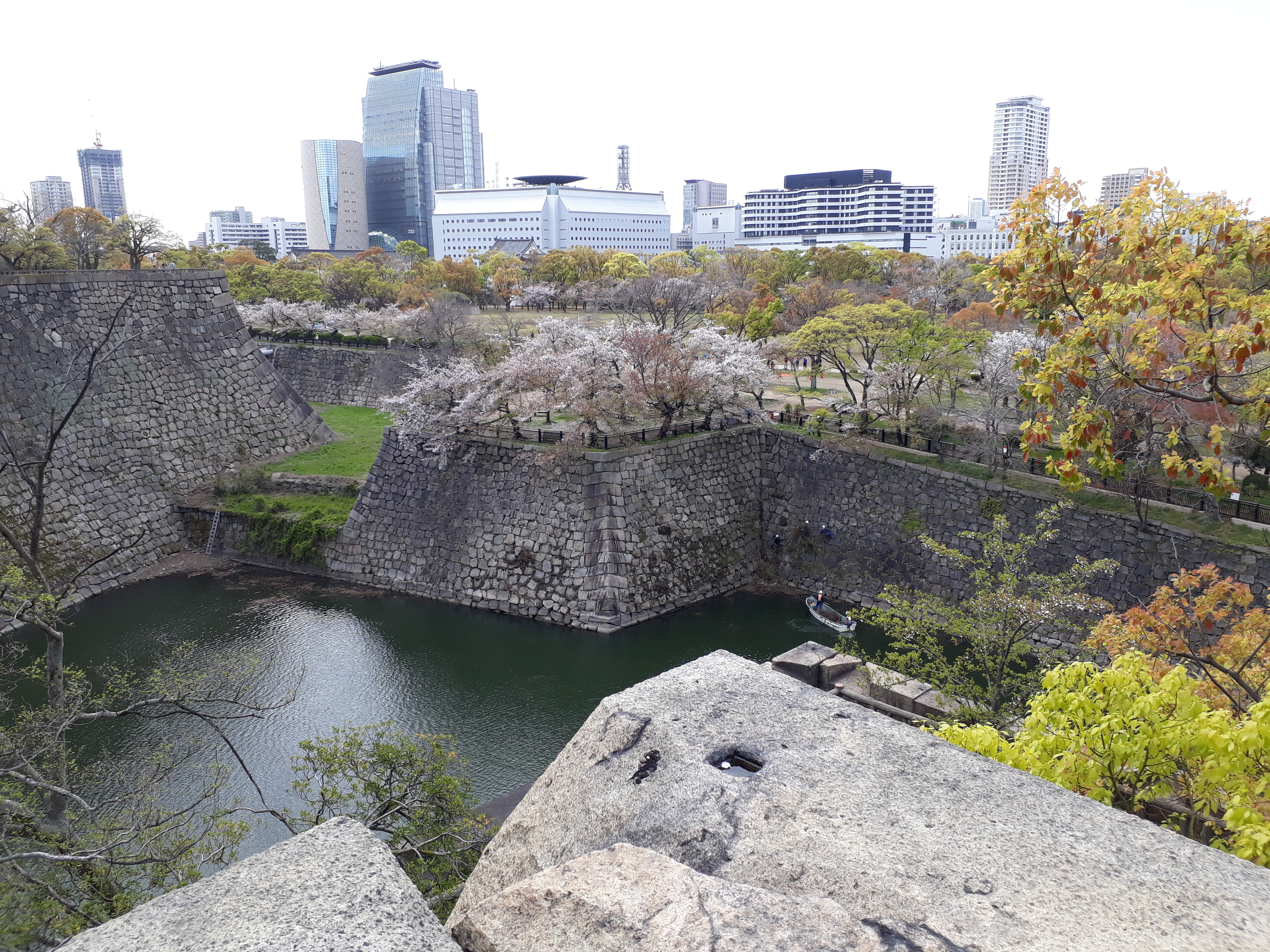
View of moat from atop Uzumimon Gate

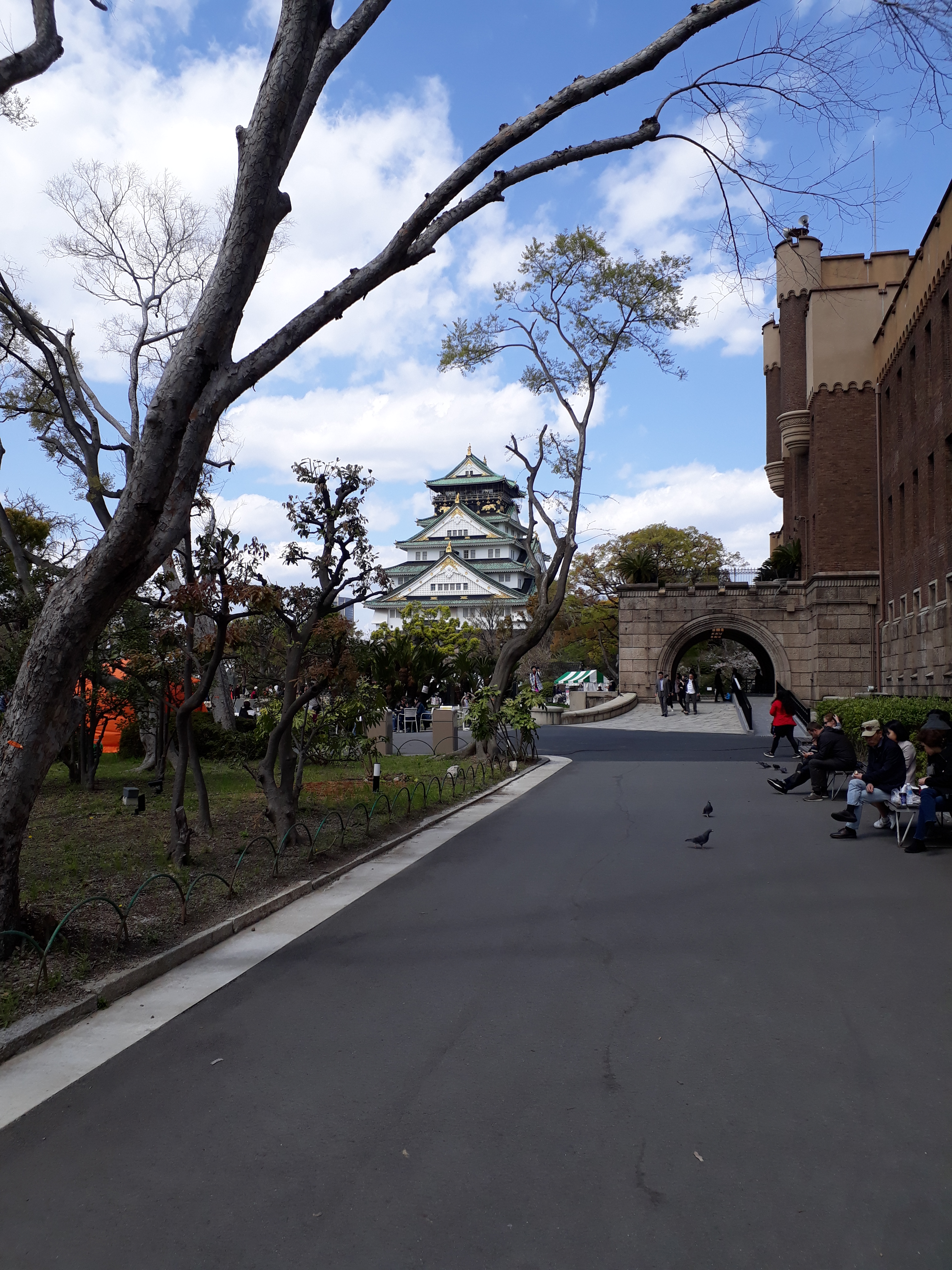
Main keep from Miraiza Building

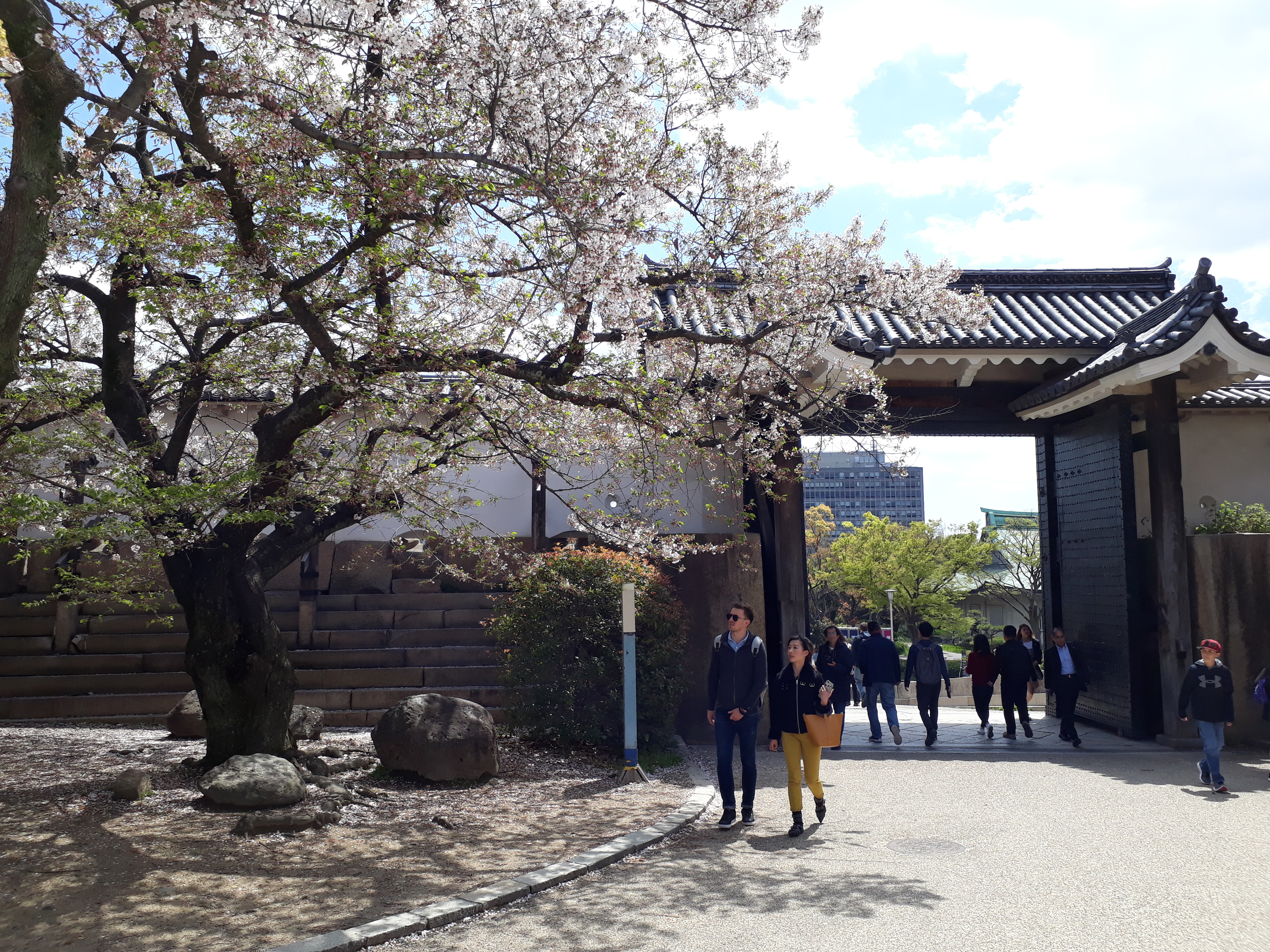
Inner-view of Sakuramon Gate

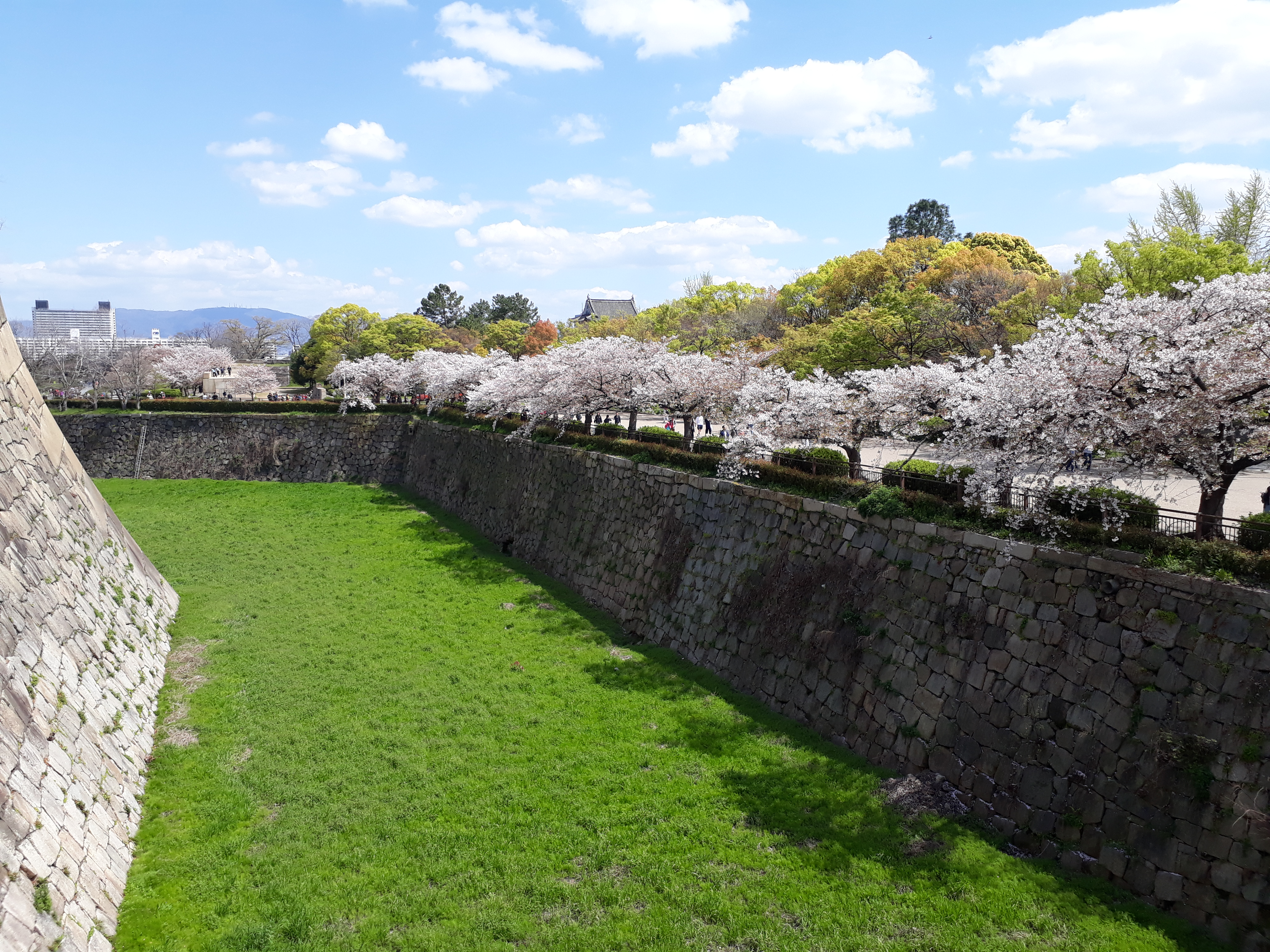
Easterly view of dry inner moat outside Sakuramon Gate

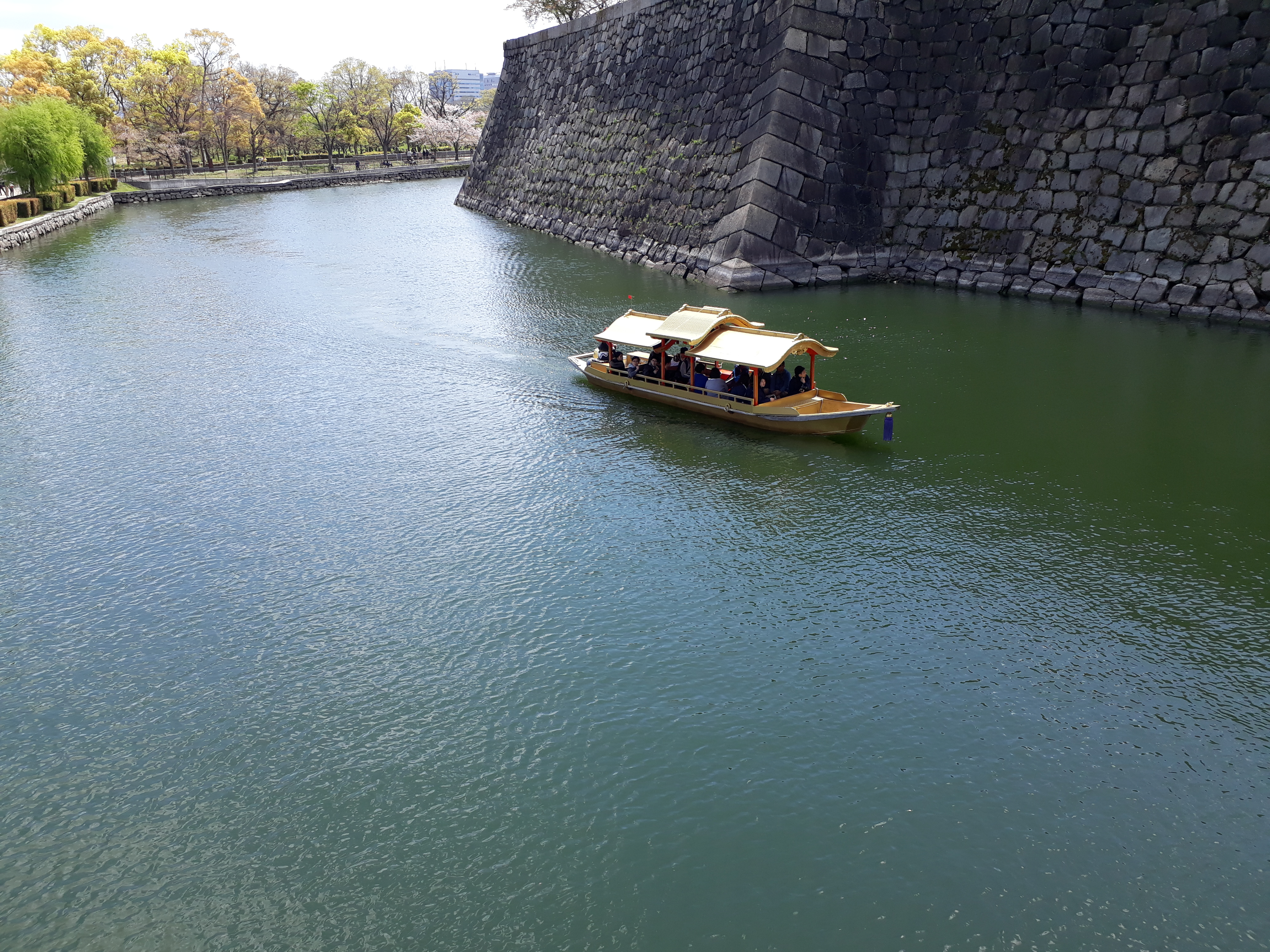
Gozabune boat ferrying tourists around on the inner moat.

== Access ==
The castle is open to the public and is easily accessible from Osakajōkōen Station on the JR West Osaka Loop Line. It is a popular spot during festival seasons, and especially during the cherry blossom bloom (hanami), when the sprawling castle grounds are covered with food vendors and taiko drummers. The large indoor arena, Osaka-jō Hall, is also located within the grounds of the castle park.

== In popular culture ==
- In the 1955 Toho tokusatsu film Godzilla Raids Again, Godzilla's battle with Anguirus through Osaka eventually reaches the grounds of Osaka Castle; the keep collapses after Godzilla pins Anguirus against it.
- In the 1966 tokusatsu film, Gamera vs. Barugon, the titular monsters' first encounter is at the site of the castle.
- The castle appears in the two-parter of the 1966 tokusatsu television series, Ultraman, where the titular hero does battle with the monster Gomora on the castle grounds.
- In 1975, British novelist James Clavell used the castle and its environs (c. 1600) as a major plot location for his most famous work of historical fiction, Shōgun.
  - In the 1980 adaptation, Himeji Castle's environs stand in for Osaka Castle.
  - For the 2024 adaptation, the castle is portrayed via CGI reconstruction with its period-accurate black lacquering, both in-story and as part of the title sequence. The interior chambers and halls were constructed as physical sets.
- The castle was featured in the finale of The Amazing Race 20, where it hosted a Pit Stop.
- In the 2002 film Suicide Club, it is reported that 200 high school girls jumped off the Osaka Castle.
- In the video games Yakuza 2 (2006) and Yakuza Kiwami 2 (2017), a secret golden castle hidden beneath the real Osaka Castle serves as the headquarters of the Omi Alliance’s Sengoku Family.
- The castle is featured in the 2025 video game Assassin’s Creed Shadows.

== See also ==
- Himeji Castle
- Jurakudai
- Fushimi Castle
- List of Special Places of Scenic Beauty, Special Historic Sites and Special Natural Monuments
- List of foreign-style castles in Japan
- Tourism in Japan

== Appendix ==
=== Bibliography ===
- Atobe, Shin (2019). "新発見の書状が語る「大坂幕府構想」". 歴史街道. PHP研究所. ASIN B07MHQ59GP.
- Benesch, Oleg. "Castles and the Militarisation of Urban Society in Imperial Japan," Transactions of the Royal Historical Society, Vol. 28 (Dec. 2018), pp. 107–134.
- Benesch, Oleg and Ran Zwigenberg (2019). Japan's Castles: Citadels of Modernity in War and Peace. Cambridge: Cambridge University Press. p. 374. ISBN 978-1108481946.
- De Lange, William (2021). An Encyclopedia of Japanese Castles. Groningen: Toyo Press. p. 600. ISBN 978-9492722300.
- De Lange, William. (2022). The Siege of Osaka Castle: The Winter and Summer Campaigns. Groningen: Toyo Press. ISBN 978-9492722386
- Fujita, Tatsuo (2019). "徳川公儀の形成と挫折". 織豊期研究. 21. 織豊期研究会. ISSN 1345-9813.
- Mitchelhill, Jennifer (2013). Castles of the Samurai: Power & Beauty. US: Kodansha. ISBN 978-1568365121.
- Schmorleitz, Morton S. (1974). Castles in Japan. Tokyo: Charles E. Tuttle Co. pp. 69–78. ISBN 0804811024.
- Motoo, Hinago (1986). Japanese Castles. Tokyo: Kodansha. p. 200. ISBN 0870117661.
