= Ishiyama Hongan-ji =

Fortress in Japan

- 石山本願寺
- Osaka, Japan
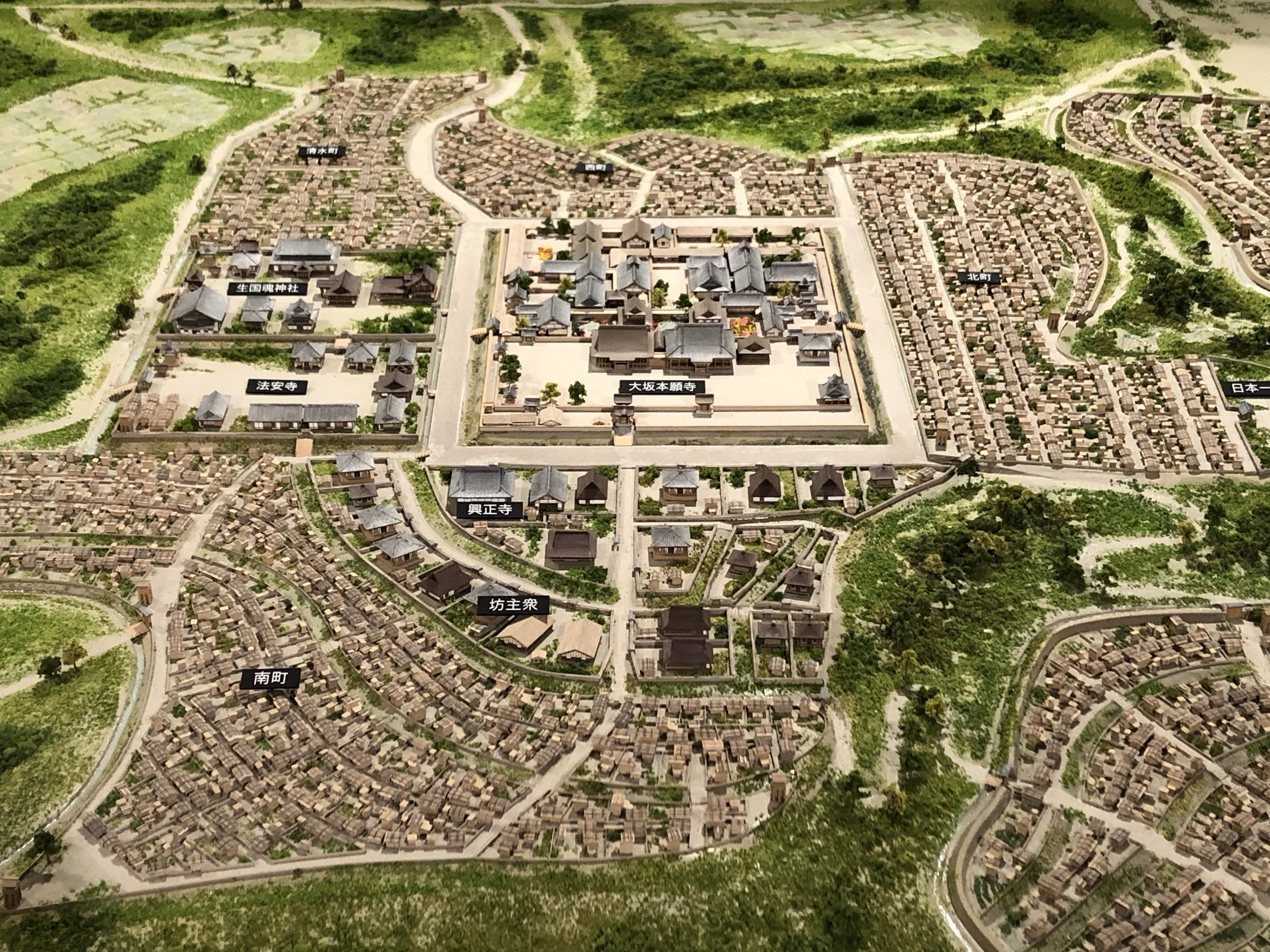
- Model of the Ishiyama Hongan-ji. Osaka castle now stands on the site

Site information
- Type: Fortified Buddhist temple
- Controlled by: Ikkō-ikki
- Condition: Not extant

Location
- Coordinates: 34°41′03″N 135°31′30″E

Site history
- Built: 1496
- Built by: Ikkō sect
- In use: 1532-1580
- Materials: Wood, stone
- Demolished: 1580, by Oda Nobunaga
- Battles/wars: Siege of Ishiyama Hongan-ji (1576-1580)

Garrison information
- Past commanders: Rennyo (founder), Kōsa (last abbot)

The Ishiyama Hongan-ji (石山本願寺) was the primary fortress of the Ikkō-ikki, leagues of warrior priests and commoners who opposed samurai rule during the Sengoku period. It was established in 1496, at the mouth of the Yodo River, on the coast of the Seto Inland Sea. At the time, this was just outside the remains of the ancient capital of Naniwa, in Settsu Province. In fact, recent archaeological research has determined that the temple was established atop the ruins of the old imperial palace. The city (now called Osaka) has since grown around the site, incorporating the Ishiyama (stone mountain).

Rennyo, the great revivalist abbott of Jōdo Shinshū (Ikkō-shū), retired to the area in 1496, initiating the series of events that would end in the formation of Japan's second-largest city. Contemporary documents describing his retirement site as being on a "long slope" (大坂, Ōzaka) are the first to call the area by that name, which has changed only slightly over time to Osaka (大阪), and become Japan's second largest city. Although Rennyo sought isolation in retiring to this quiet place, he very quickly attracted a great number of devotees and followers. The tiny temple Rennyo built for his own personal devotions was expanded, and many homes and other buildings were erected to accommodate the new residents. By the time of Rennyo's death, three years later, the general shape and size of the Ishiyama Hongan-ji was already in place.

After the 1532 destruction of Yamashina Mido in Kyoto, the Ishiyama Hongan-ji acted as the primary temple for the Ikkō sect, from which the Ikkō-ikki had sprouted. Contributions from devotees were collected through a system of brokers, primarily those based in Sakai in nearby Izumi Province.

The temple-fortress was considered impenetrable, due largely to its location and orientation. In addition, roughly a hundred priests were on patrol at any given time, and upwards of ten thousand could be summoned to battle simply by ringing a bell. The priests of the fortress came not only from Osaka and the surrounding areas, but also from the Ikko sect's home provinces of Kaga and Echizen. The priests also had many allies, including the Mōri clan, who supplied the fortress when it was under siege. Both Uesugi Kenshin and Takeda Shingen, both of whom were rivals of Oda Nobunaga, simply by keeping Nobunaga and each other occupied, did the Ikki a great service.

The Hongan-ji came under siege from the forces of Oda Nobunaga in 1570, but, due in part to its position on the coast, managed to hold out for 11 years, making this the longest siege in Japanese history. In August 1580, the Abbot Kōsa (Kennyo) was persuaded to surrender, ending the 11-year-long siege.

At the time of the surrender, the entire temple complex was set aflame. According to some sources, this was done from within, to deny Nobunaga any true material gains from having defeated the Ikki. Though some members of the group fled to Kaga Province to make a final stand, the destruction of the Ishiyama Hongan-ji was truly the killing blow which marked the destruction of the sect as a militant force.

Three years later, Toyotomi Hideyoshi began the construction of Osaka Castle on the same site.

== See also ==
- Siege of Ishiyama Hongan-ji
