= Shimozuma Rairyū =

Japanese Buddhist monk

Shimozuma Rairyū (下間頼竜) (1552– 16 July 1609) was a Sōhei guardian-priest of Hongan-ji.

Rairyū negotiated peace between the temple, Hongan-ji, and Oda Nobunaga, after the latter had laid siege to it. It is known that Rairyū was very fond of tea ceremonies. Rairyū invited a master of tea, Tsuda Sōtatsu to join him in a ceremony of tea.
