= Kōsa =

Japanese warrior monk

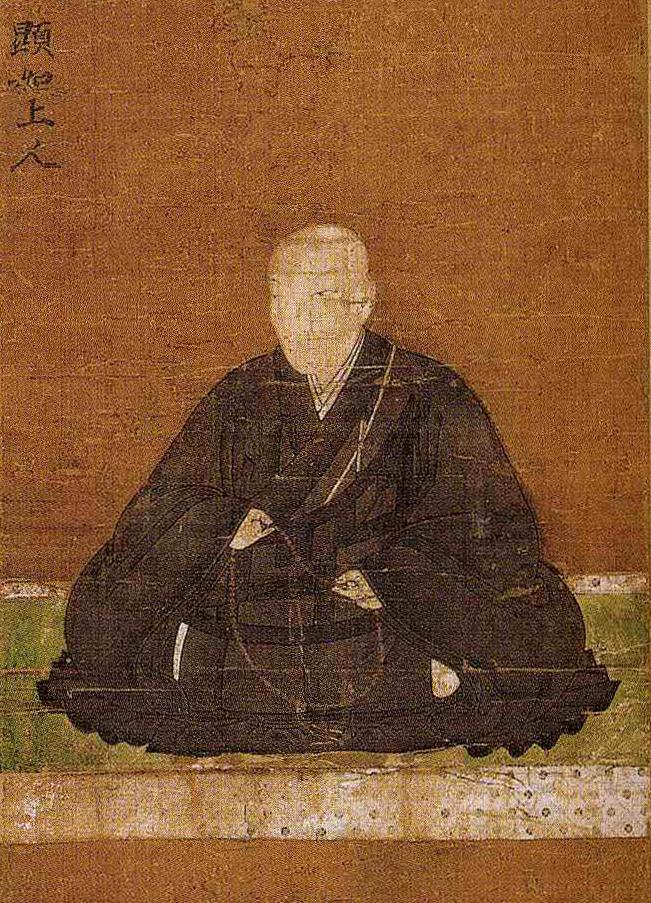
Kennyo

Kennyo (顕如; February 20, 1543 – December 27, 1592), also known as Kōsa (光佐), was the 11th patriarch of the Hongan-ji lineage of Jodo Shinshu Buddhism, and Chief Abbot of Ishiyama Hongan-ji, cathedral fortress of the Ikkō-ikki (Buddhist warrior priests and peasants who opposed samurai rule), during its siege at the end of the Sengoku period. Similar to his father, Shōnyo (10th patriarch), Kennyo engineered many alliances, and organized the defenses of the cathedral to the point that most at the time considered Ishiyama Hongan-ji to be unbreachable.

== Biography ==
In 1570, Takeda Shingen, a relative of Kennyo through marriage, faced not one but three major rivals: Oda Nobunaga, Tokugawa Ieyasu, and Uesugi Kenshin. He asked the Abbot for aid, and Kennyo persuaded the Ikkō sectarians (also called monto) in Kaga Province to rise up against Uesugi Kenshin. Several years later, after the death of Takeda Shingen, Kennyo secured the aid of the Mōri clan in fighting Oda Nobunaga and defending the Hongan-ji's supply lines from blockade.

Oda Nobunaga's Siege of Ishiyama Hongan-ji began in 1570, and would be the longest siege in Japanese history. In accordance with Kennyo's strategic organization of the defenses and alliances, the fortress was all but impervious to attack, and the Mōri clan fleet defended the supply lines for some time. Kennyo (and the Mōri) requested aid from both Takeda Katsuyori (son of Shingen) and Uesugi Kenshin, as well as the Ikkō armies of other provinces, to attack Nobunaga, relieving the siege. But neither Takeda nor Uesugi answered his call.

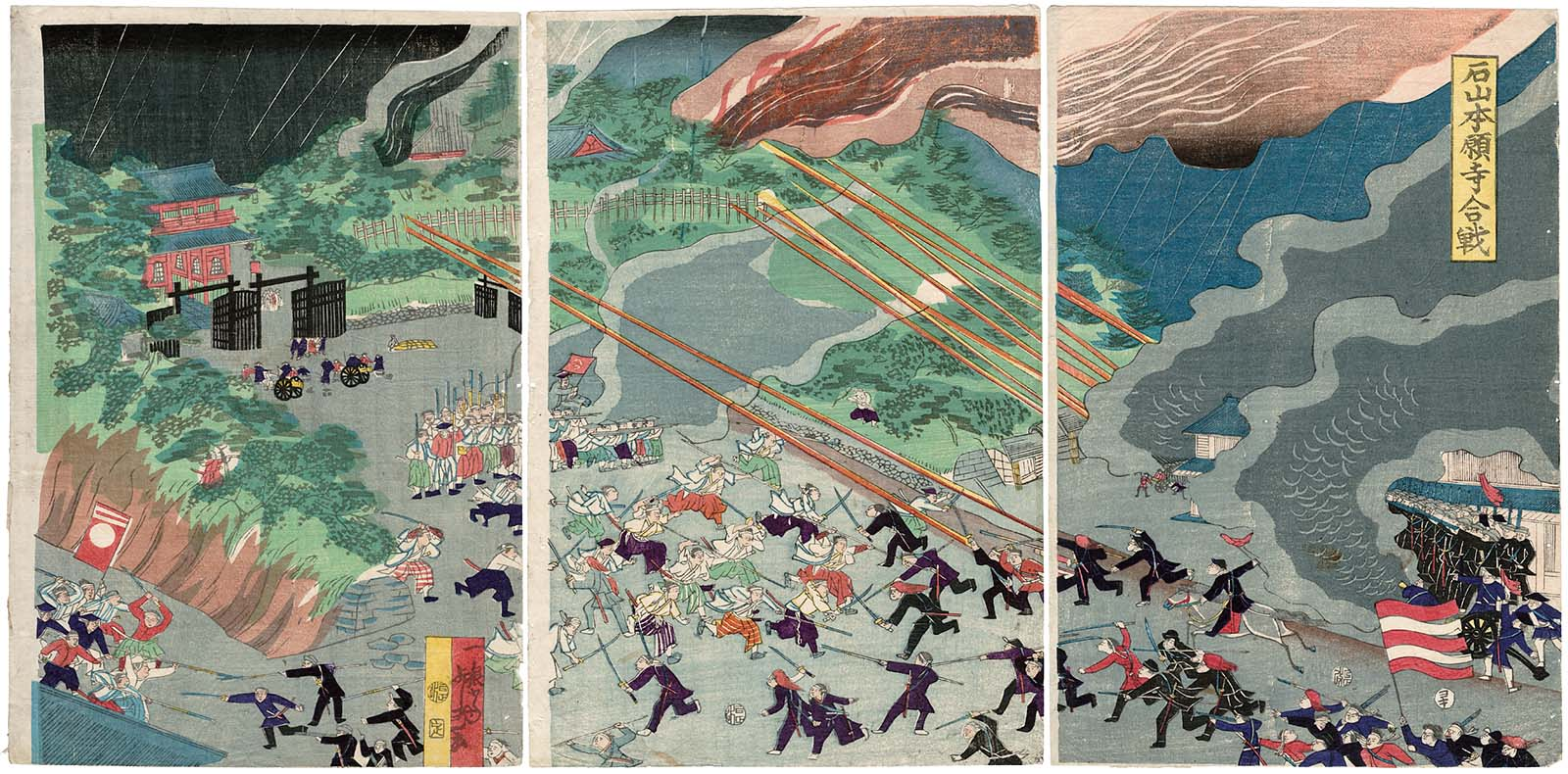
The battle of Ishiyama Hongan-ji, by Utagawa Yoshifuji (1828–1887).

When Nobunaga attacked the fortress with 3,000 troops, the priests answered with 15,000; Nobunaga then turned to attacking Kennyo's allies, the Asakura, Uesugi, and Azai clans as well as other outposts of Ikkō-ikki priests. The Abbot wrote a desperate letter to Ikko followers in Musashi and Sagami Provinces, asking them to stand fast, and to send supplies and reinforcements. The fortress' supplies were nearly exhausted, and their outposts were nearly all destroyed by 1580. Nobunaga ordered the Abbot to evacuate the fortress, and to leave Osaka. Kennyo deliberated with his allies, particularly the Mōri, and then left for Kii Province, hoping to raise reinforcements. He left his son in charge of the fortress, who surrendered after an Imperial Messenger arrived with an official request from the Emperor that he do so. The fortress burned down after the priests left it.

Despite this defeat, Kennyo remained devoted to the Ikko sect, and to the idea of regaining a central cathedral fortress for the sect. He began to enlist the help of Ikko sectarians to aid Toyotomi Hideyoshi, in order to gain Hideyoshi's favor. In 1583, Kennyo sent Ikko warriors to harass Hideyoshi's enemy Shibata Katsuie, and in 1587 he sent messengers to Kyushu, asking Ikko leaders there to act as guides for Hideyoshi's army in Satsuma Province. In 1589, Hideyoshi granted Kennyo his wish for a new Hongan-ji. The site was the shrine to the patriarch Shinran, in Kyoto; it was moved in 1591, and is now known as the Nishi Hongan-ji.

== In popular culture ==
In fiction, Kennyo usually appears with the name Honganji Kennyo. Kennyo appears as a non-playable character in Koei's video games Samurai Warriors, Kessen III and Mōri Motonari: Chikai no Sanshi, and as a playable character in Capcom's Sengoku Basara 2, where he is depicted as an obese, greedy leader of a religious sect. He also appears in Total War: Shogun 2 as a playable faction leader and in battle general, notable for large peasant armies, and elite warrior monk retinues.

Kennyo is also a character in Ikémen Sengoku, a dating simulator otome game released by Cybird in 2015.

== Sources ==
- George Sansom. A History of Japan: 1334–1615. Stanford: Stanford University Press (1961)
