= 2019 G20 Osaka summit =

Fourteenth meeting of the G20, first in Japan

2019 G20 Osaka summit 14th G20 Summit
- 28–29 June 2019

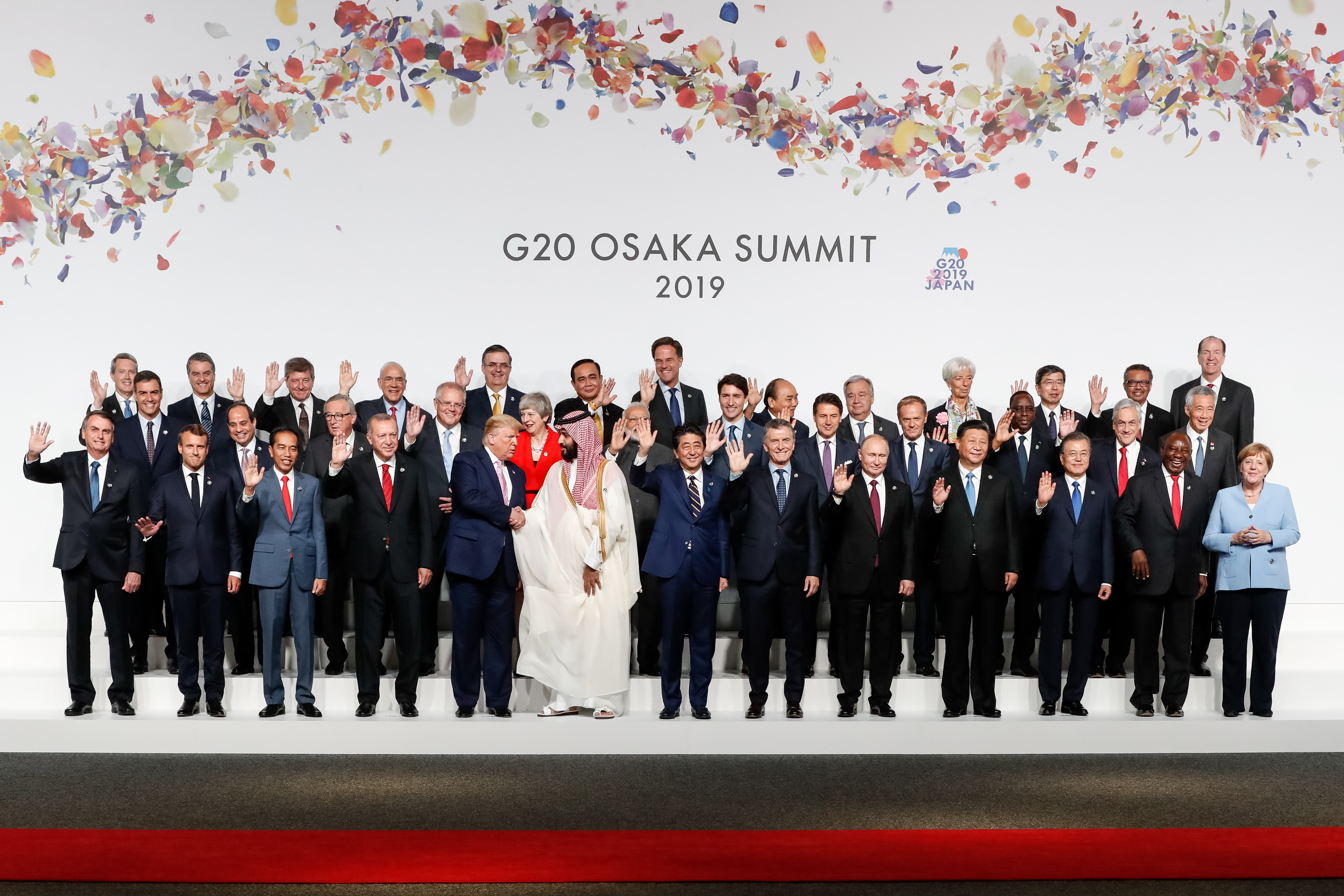
- 2019 G20 summit attendees
- Host country: Japan
- Motto: Ensure Global Sustainable Development
- Cities: Osaka; Kobe; & Sapporo
- Venues: Intex Osaka
- Participants: G20 members Invited bodies: United Nations; WTO; ASEAN; Asian Development Bank; International Labour Organization; Organisation for Economic Co-operation and Development; Financial Stability Board; World Health Organization; World Bank
- Chair: Shinzō Abe

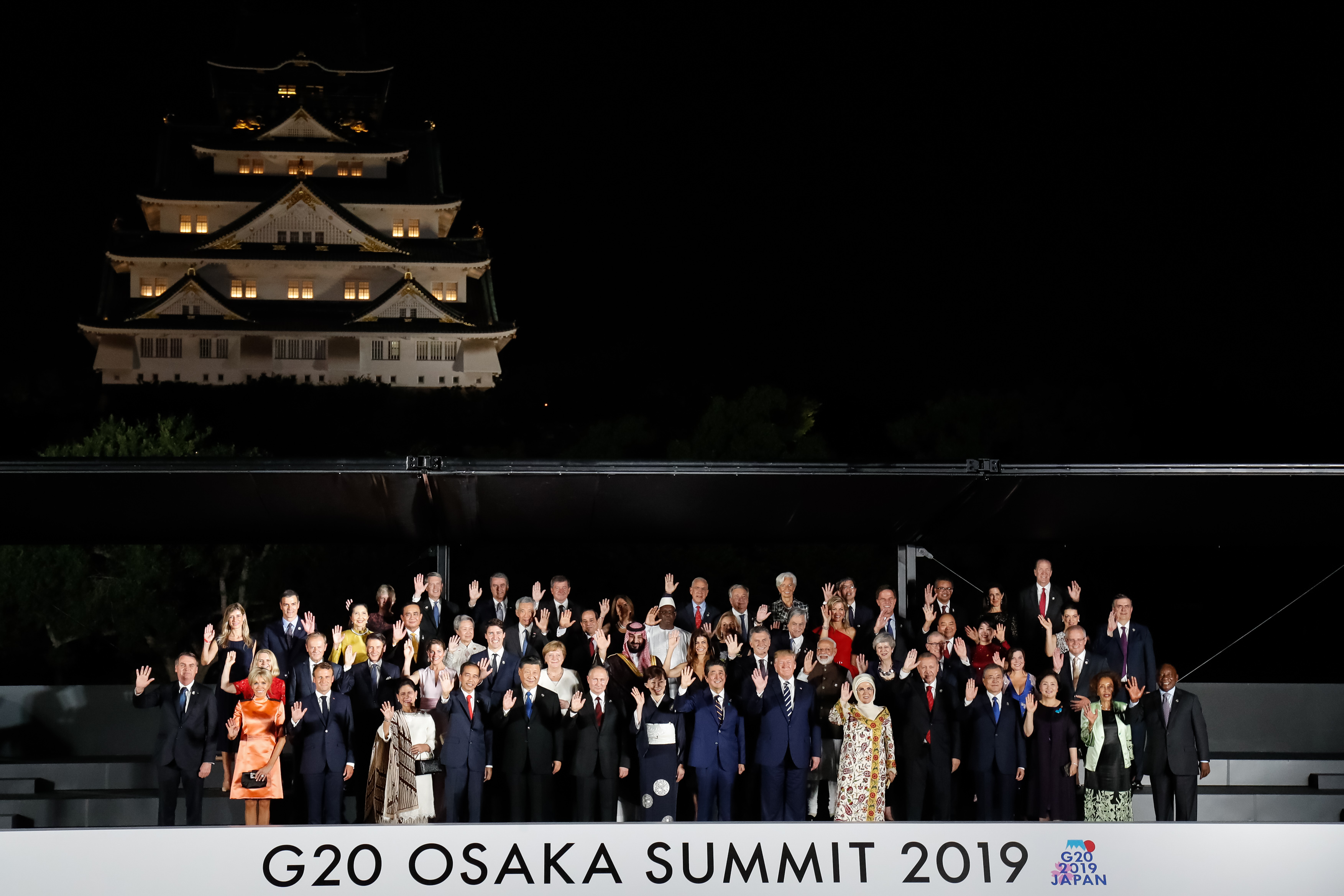
G20 leaders at Osaka Castle

The 2019 G20 Osaka summit was the fourteenth meeting of the G20, held at the International Exhibition Center in Osaka. It was the first G20 summit hosted by Japan.

== Participating leaders ==
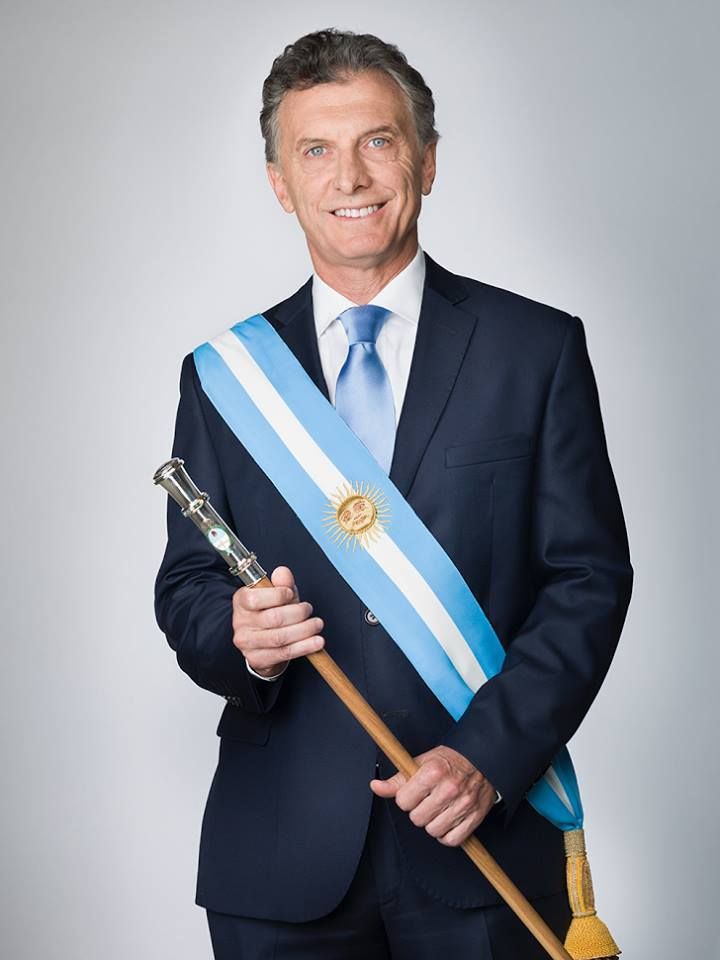
Argentina
Mauricio Macri, President

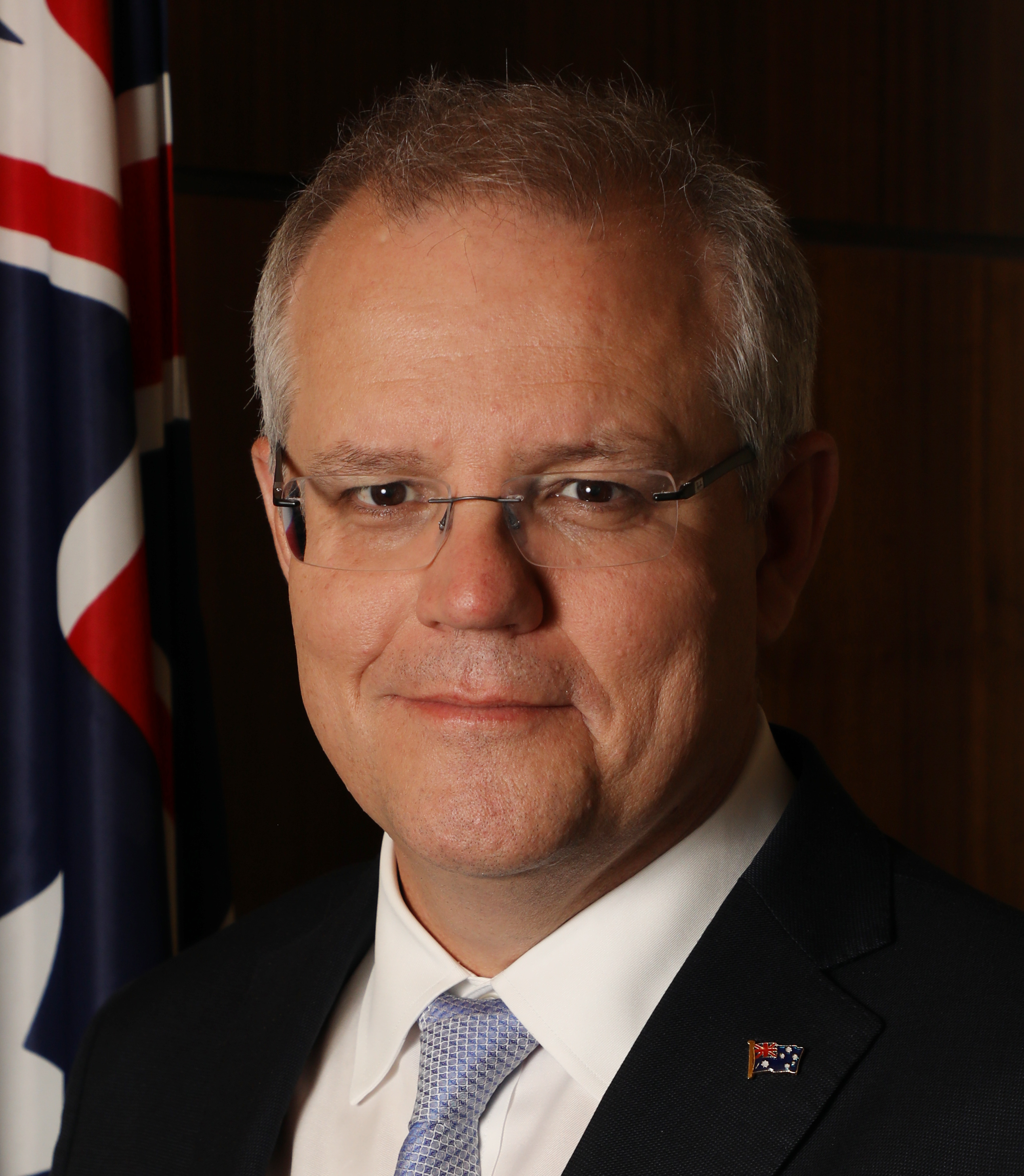
Australia
Scott Morrison, Prime Minister

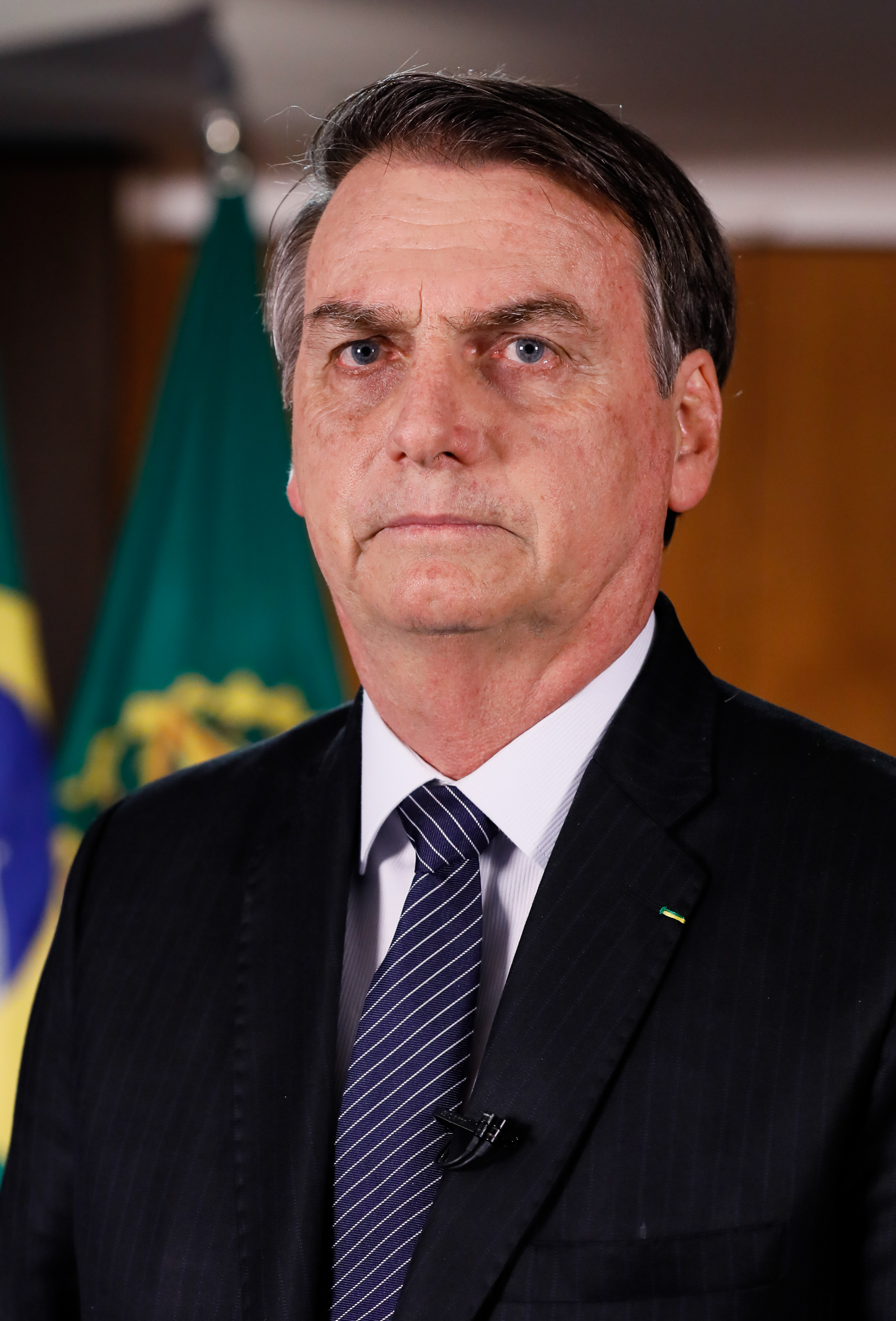
Brazil
Jair Bolsonaro, President

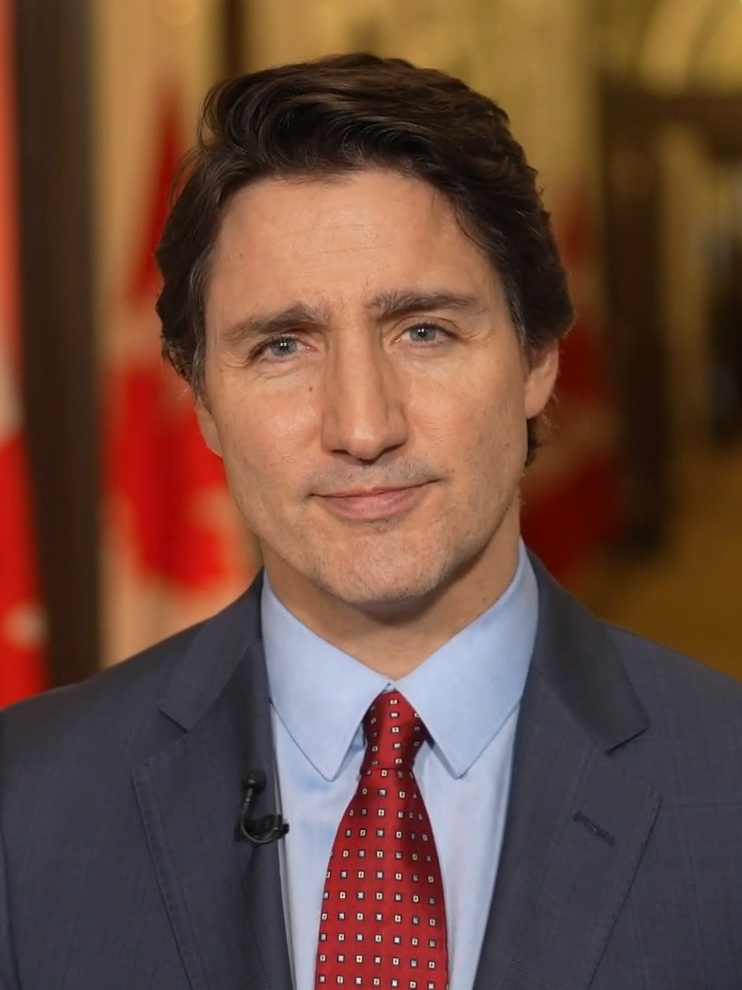
Canada
Justin Trudeau, Prime Minister

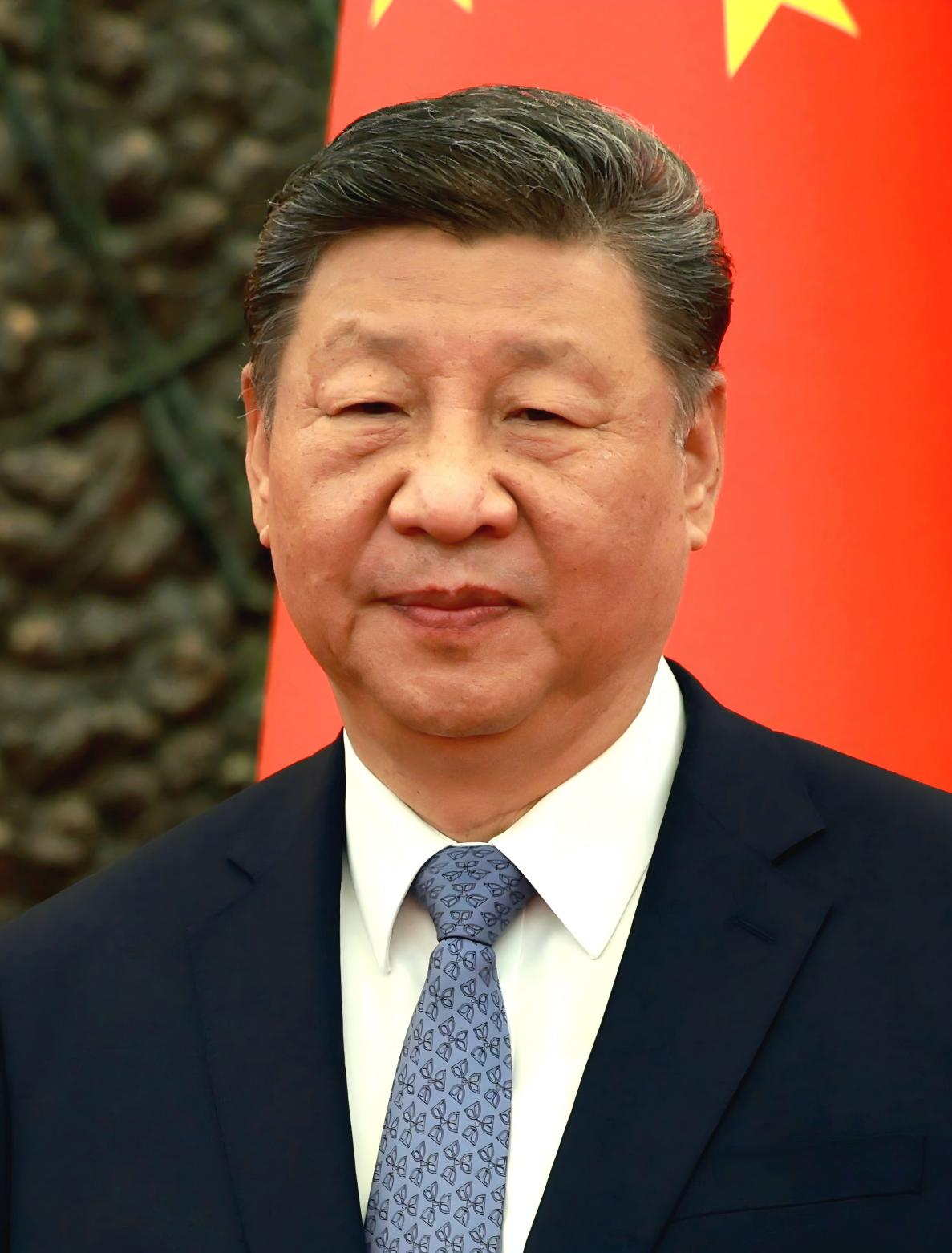
China
Xi Jinping, President

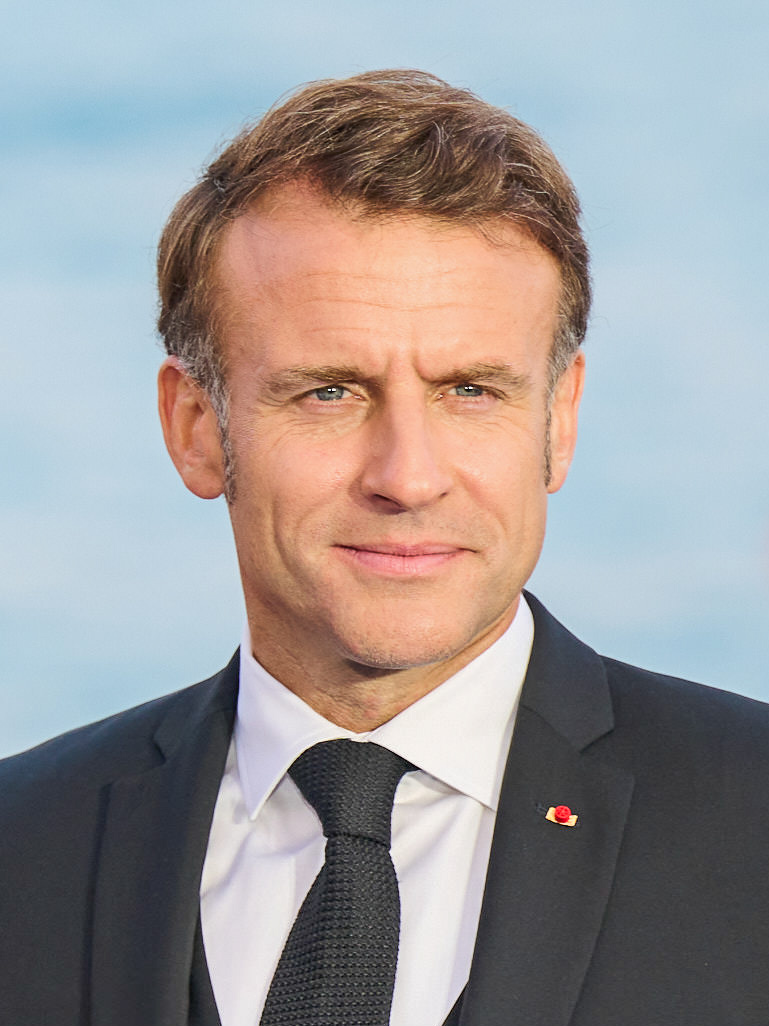
France
Emmanuel Macron, President

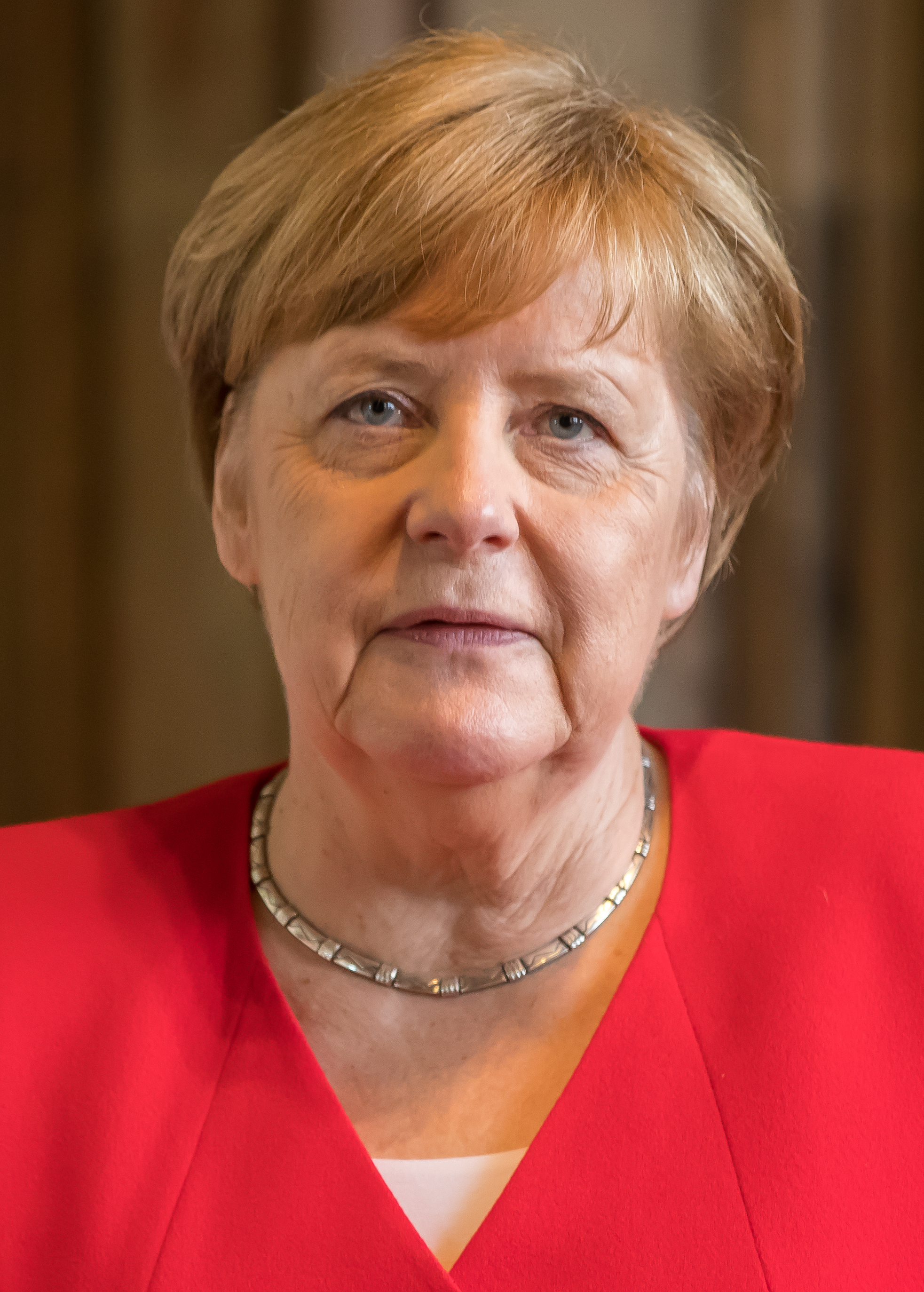
Germany
Angela Merkel, Chancellor

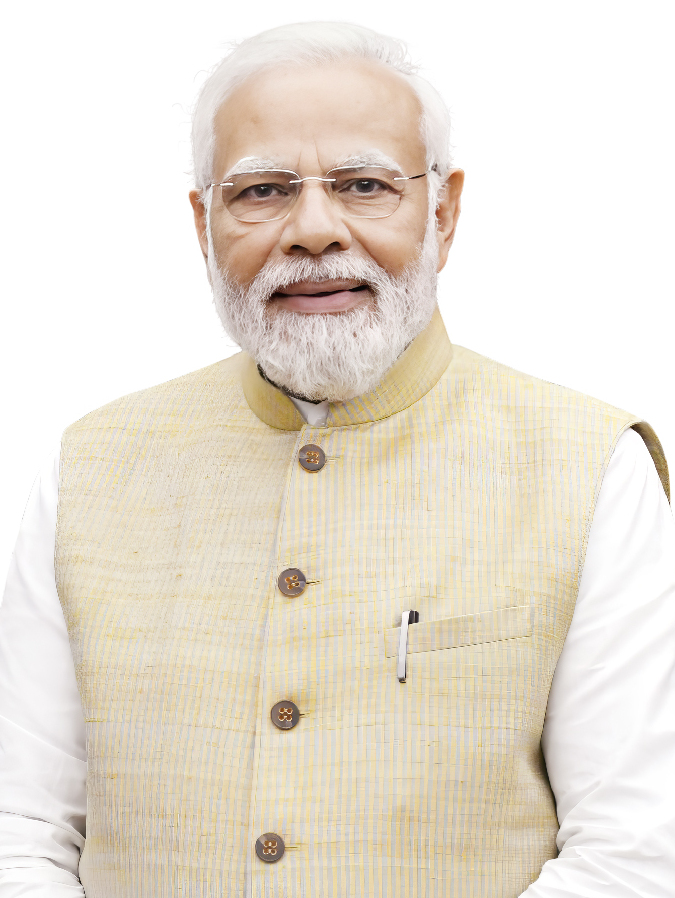
India
Narendra Modi, Prime Minister

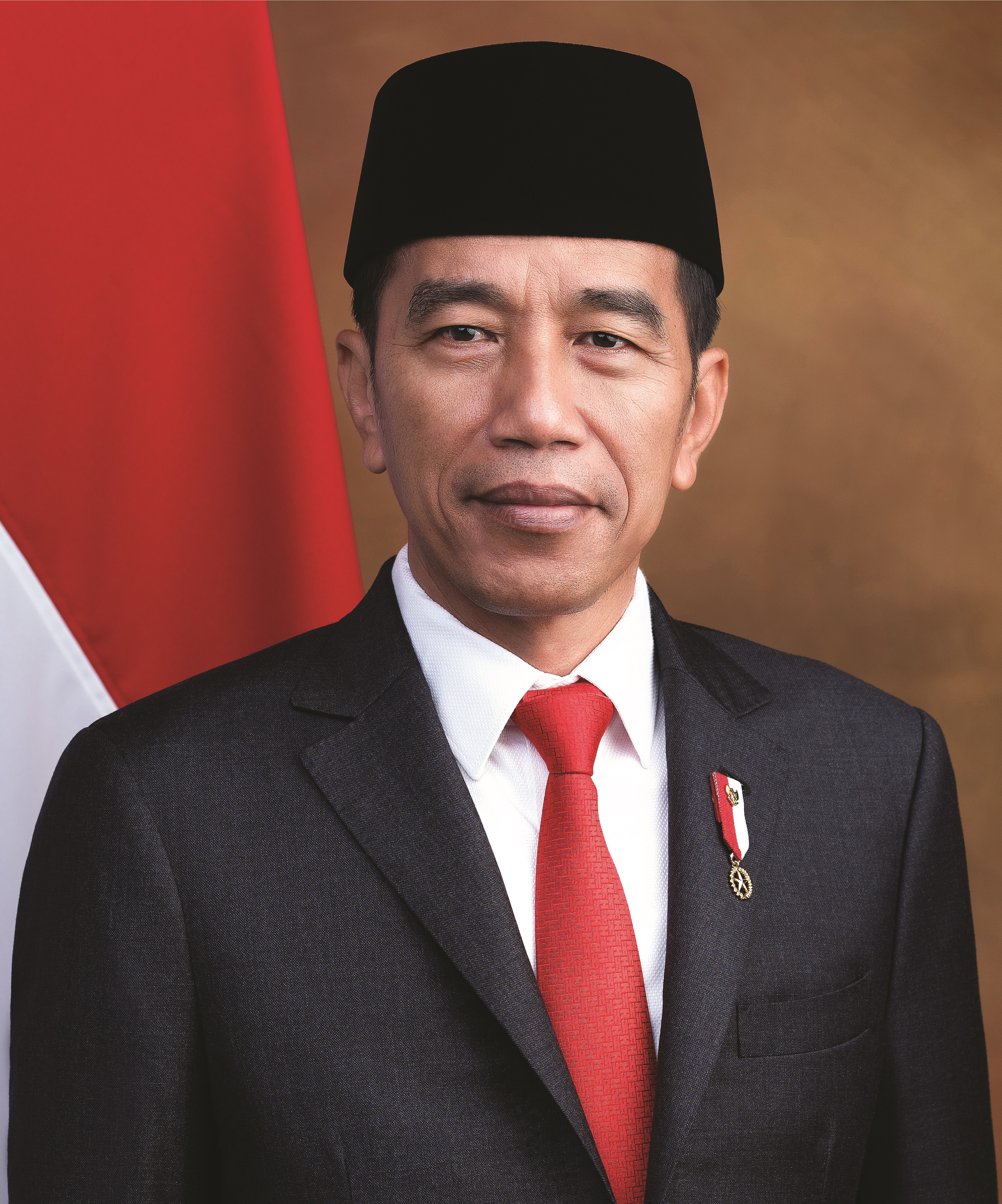
Indonesia
Joko Widodo, President

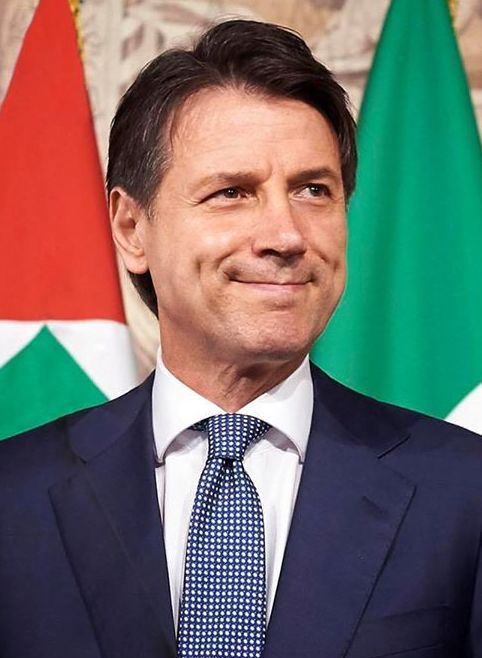
Italy
Giuseppe Conte, Prime Minister

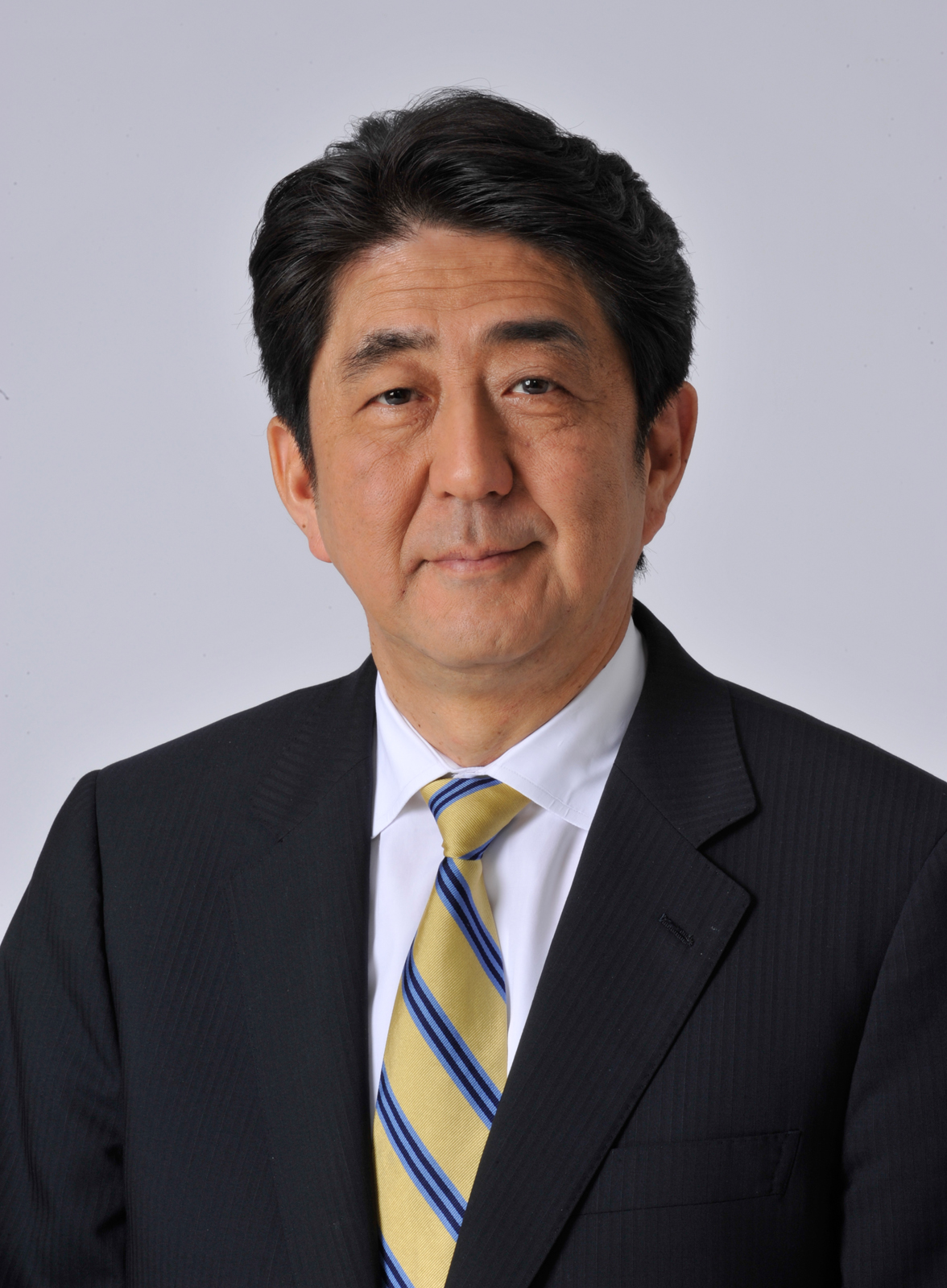
Japan
Shinzō Abe, Prime Minister (host)

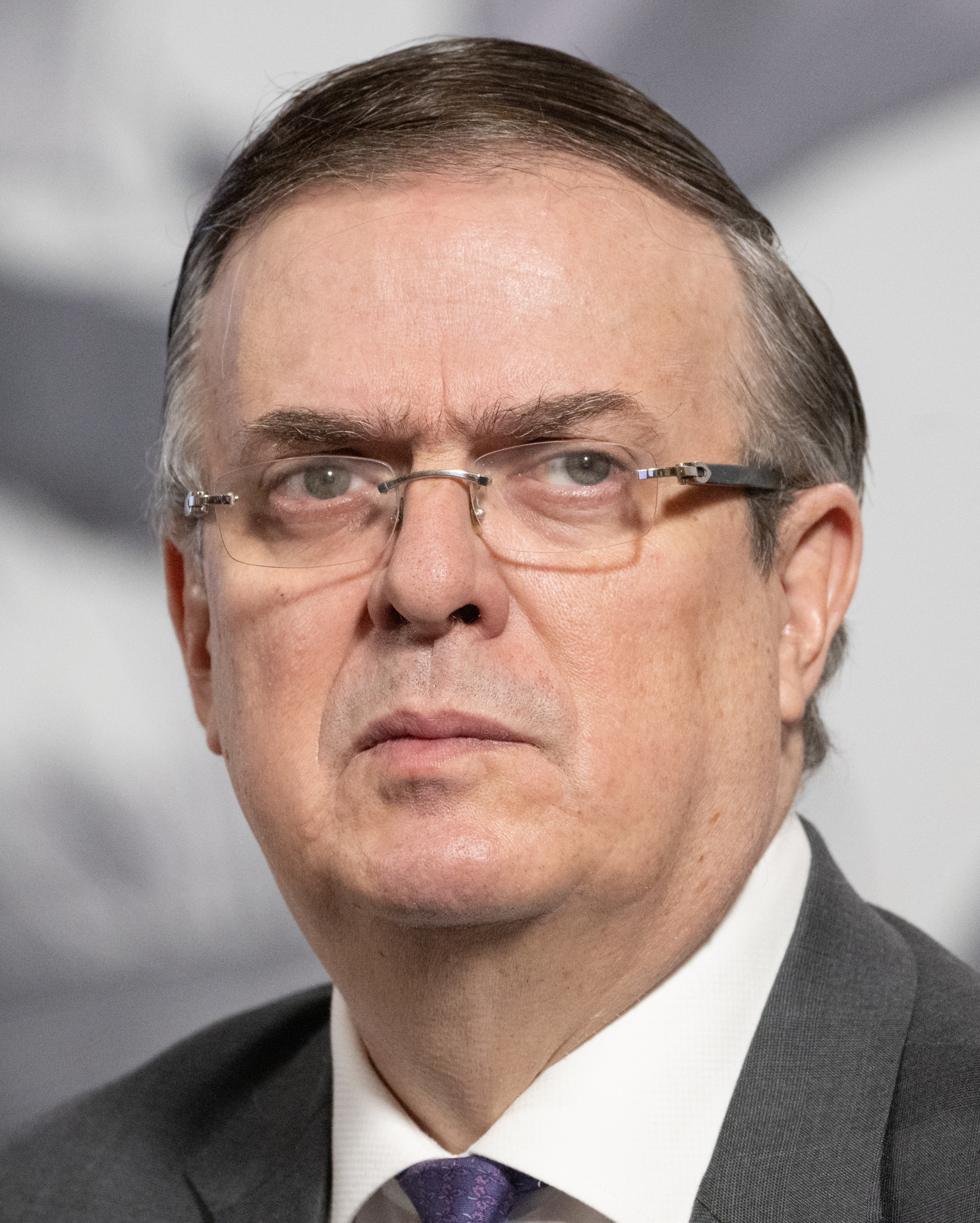
Mexico
Marcelo Ebrard, Secretary of Foreign Affairs

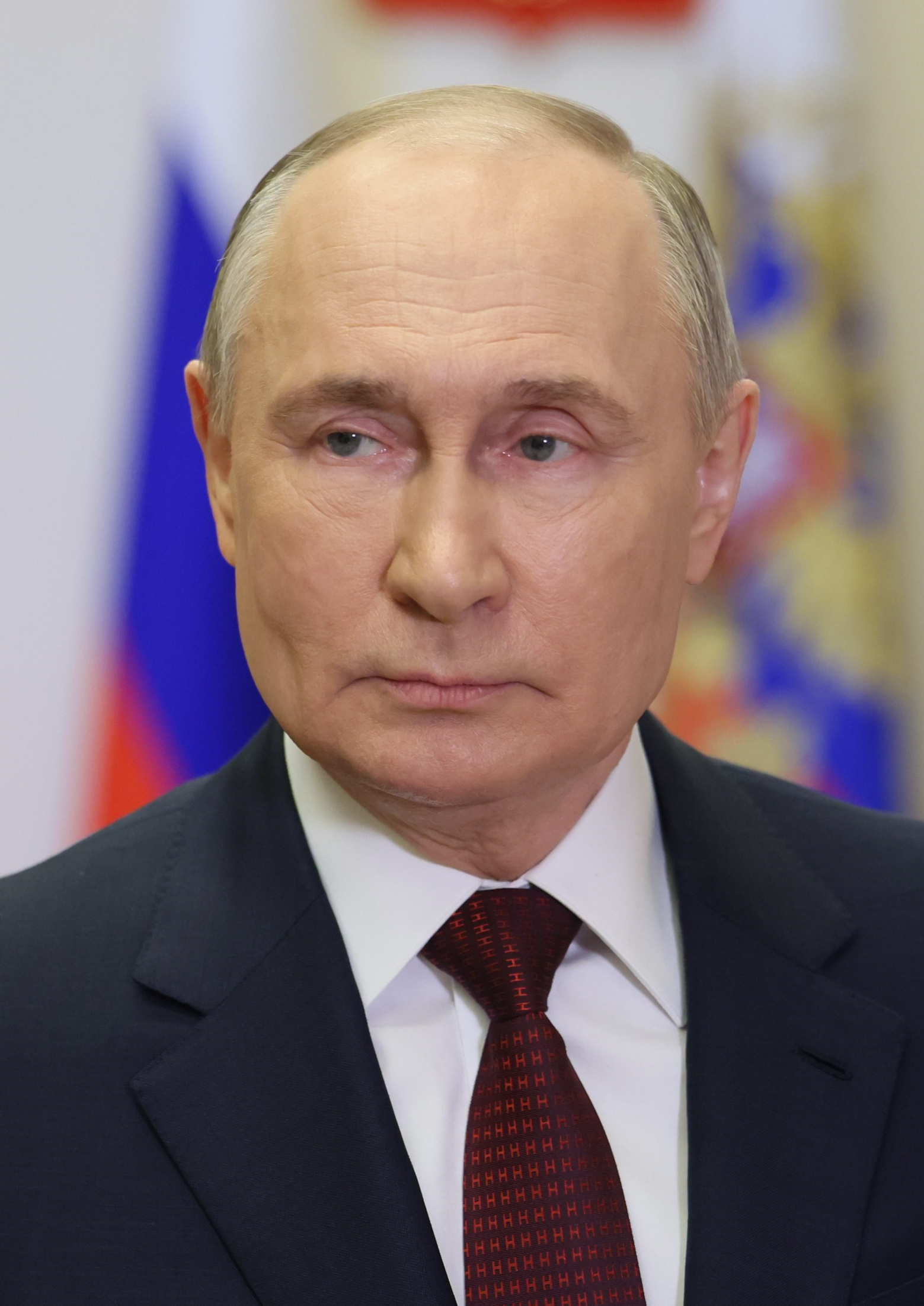
Russia
Vladimir Putin, President

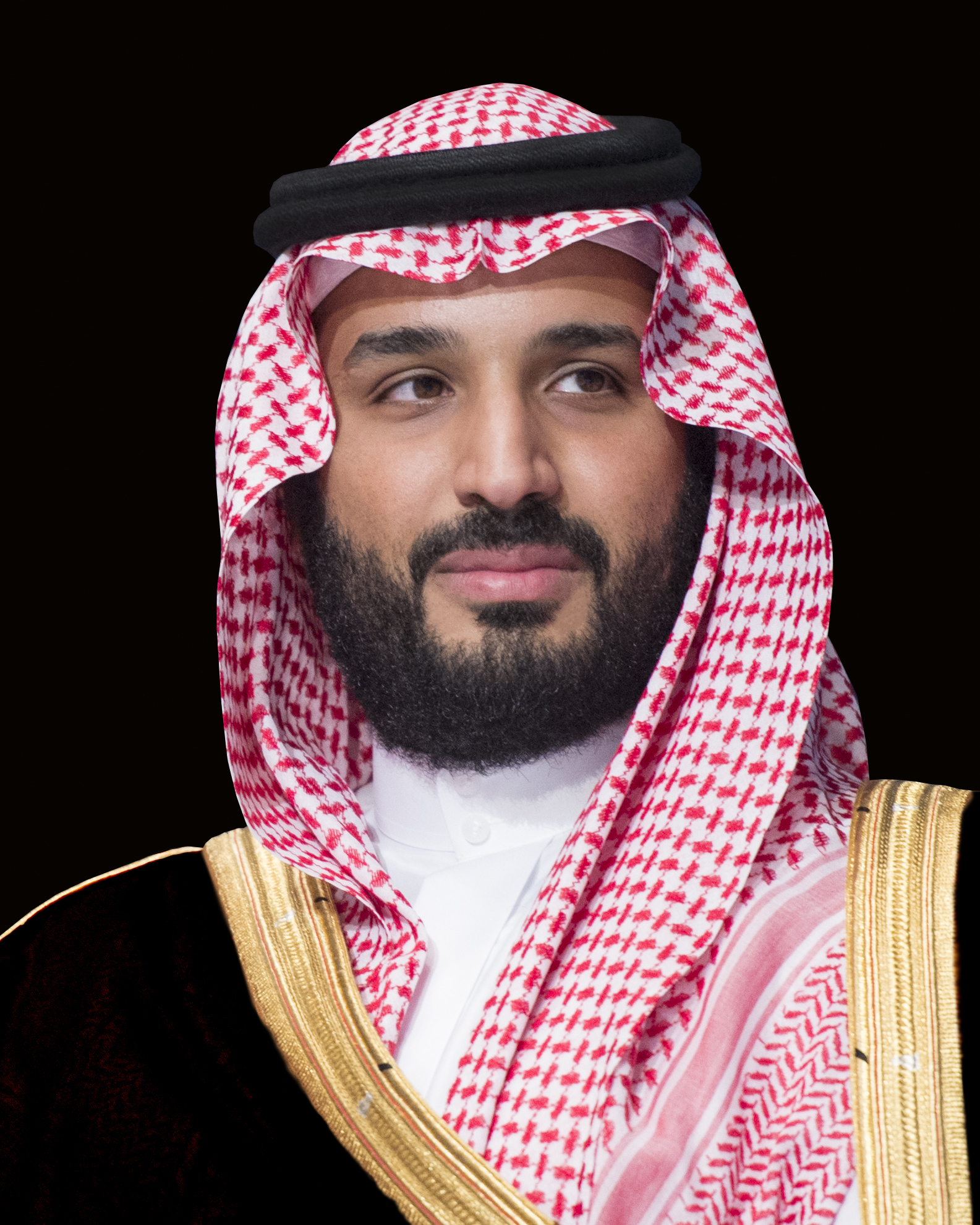
Saudi Arabia
Mohammad bin Salman, Crown Prince

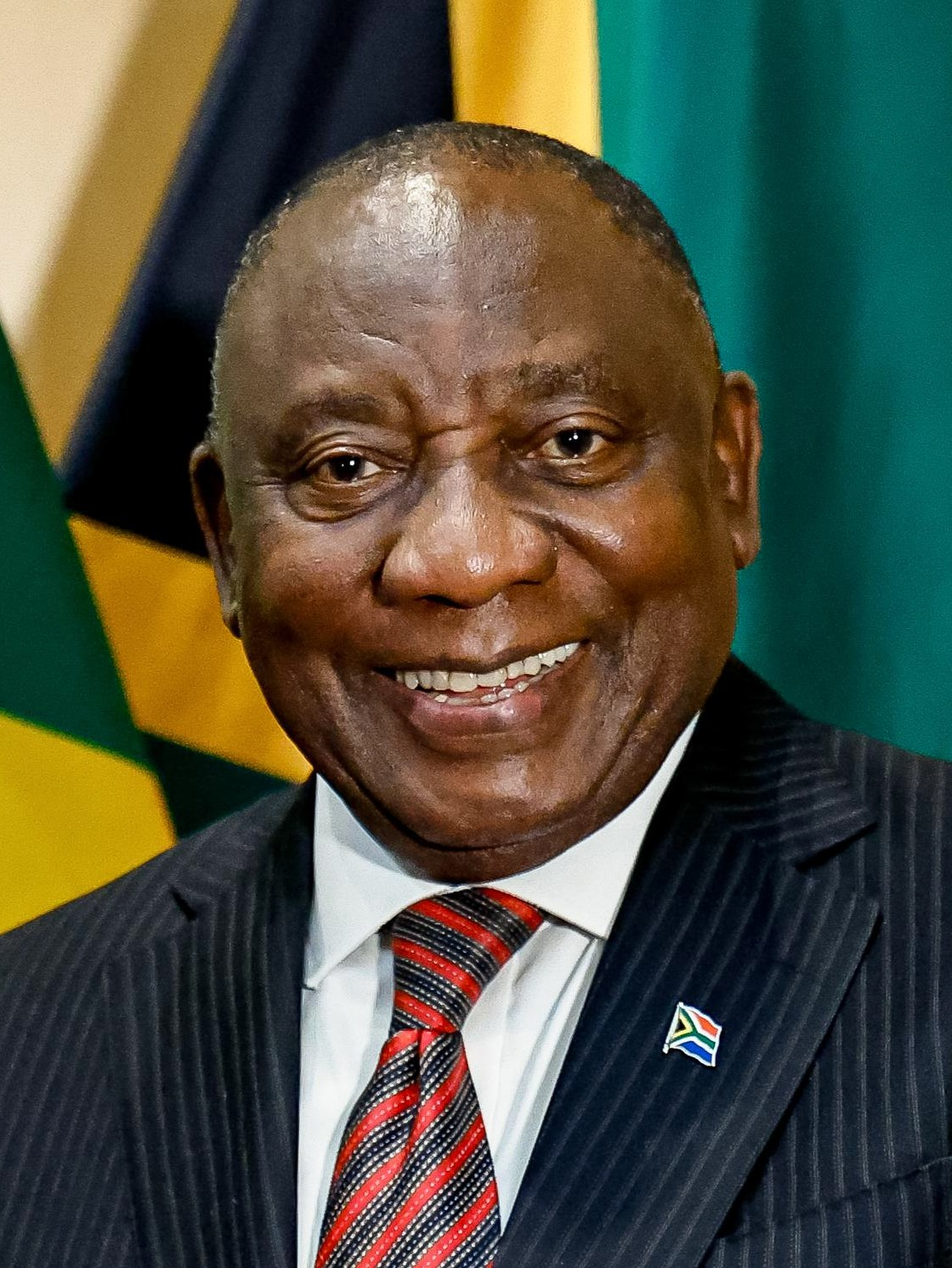
South Africa
Cyril Ramaphosa, President

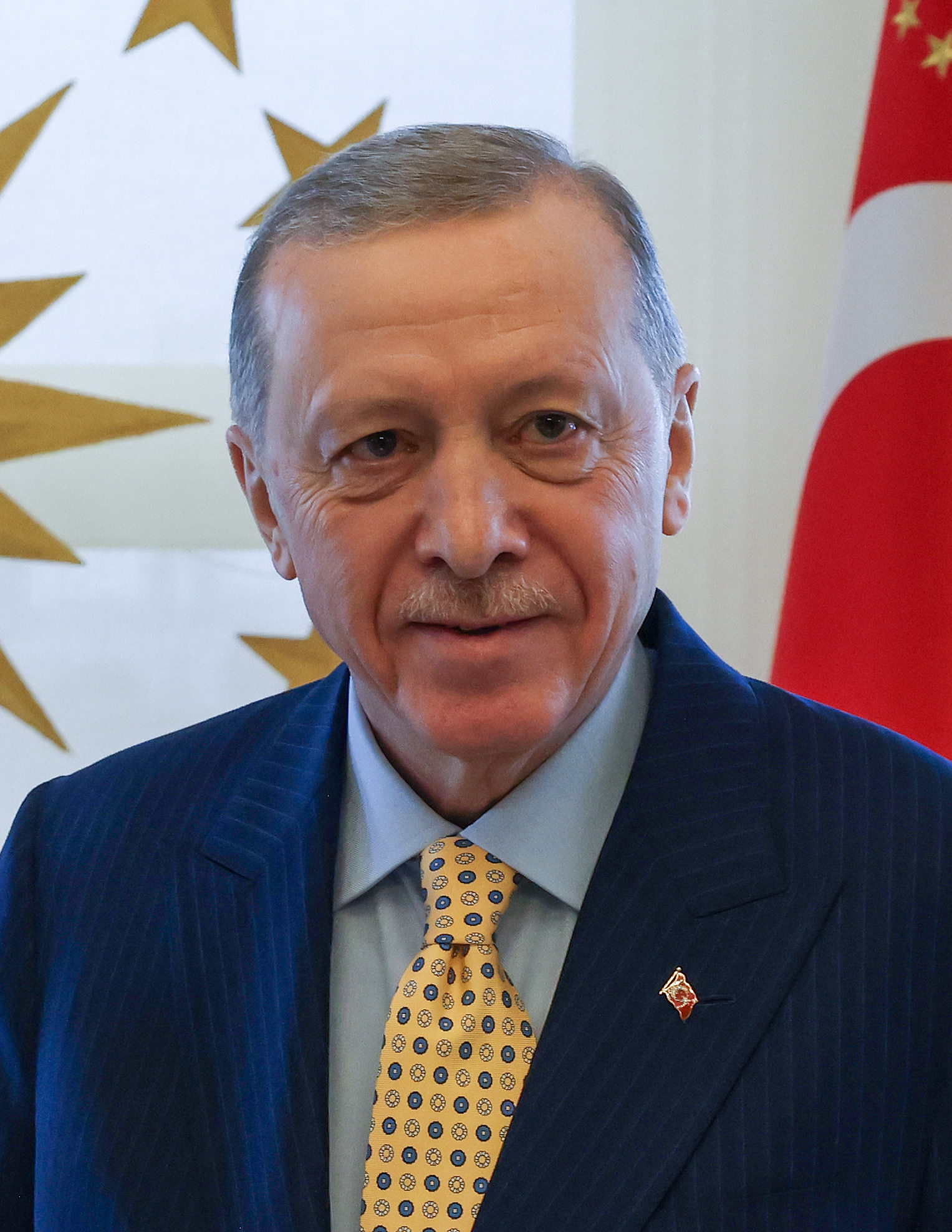
Turkey
Recep Tayyip Erdoğan, President

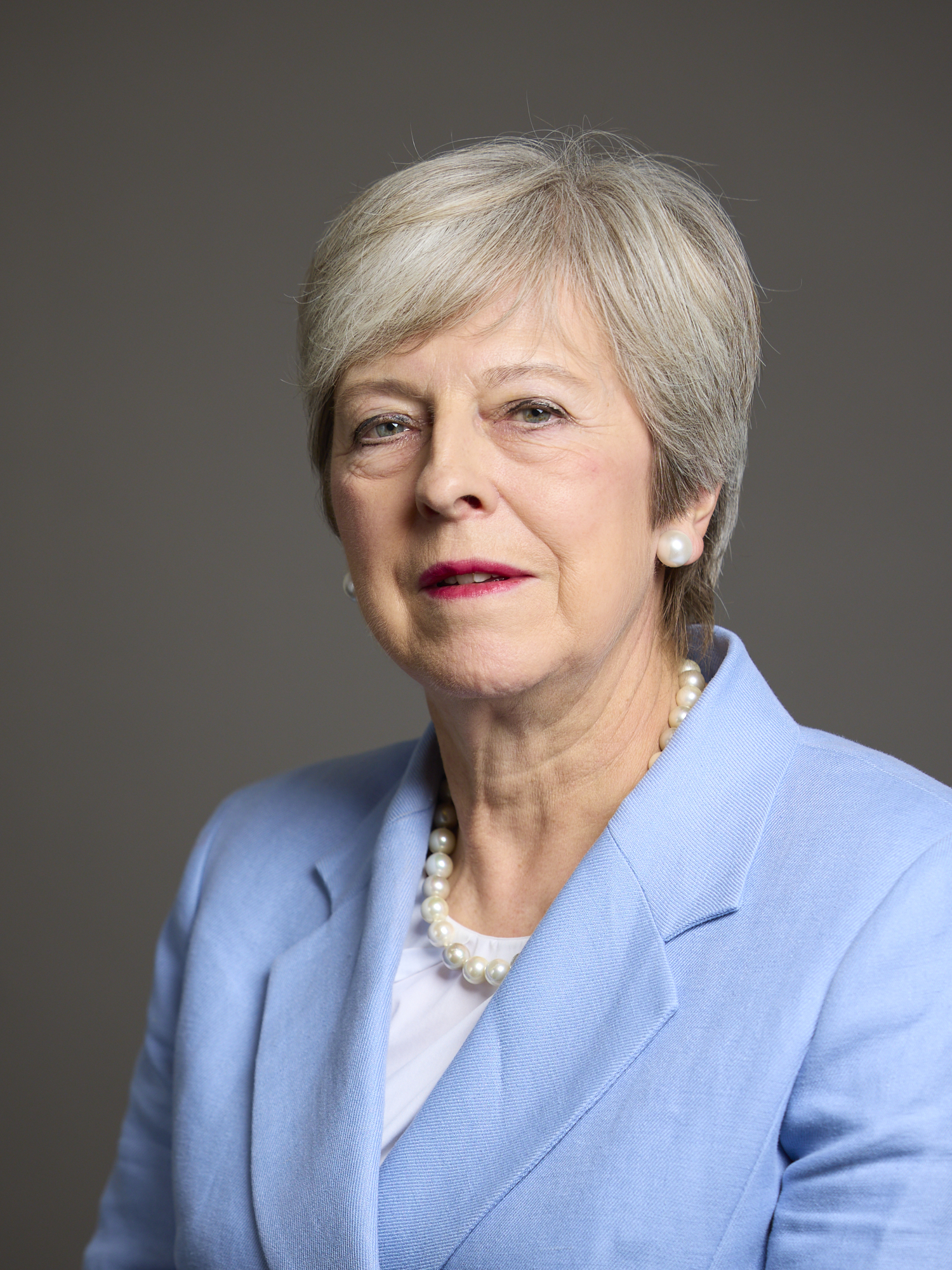
United Kingdom
Theresa May, Prime Minister

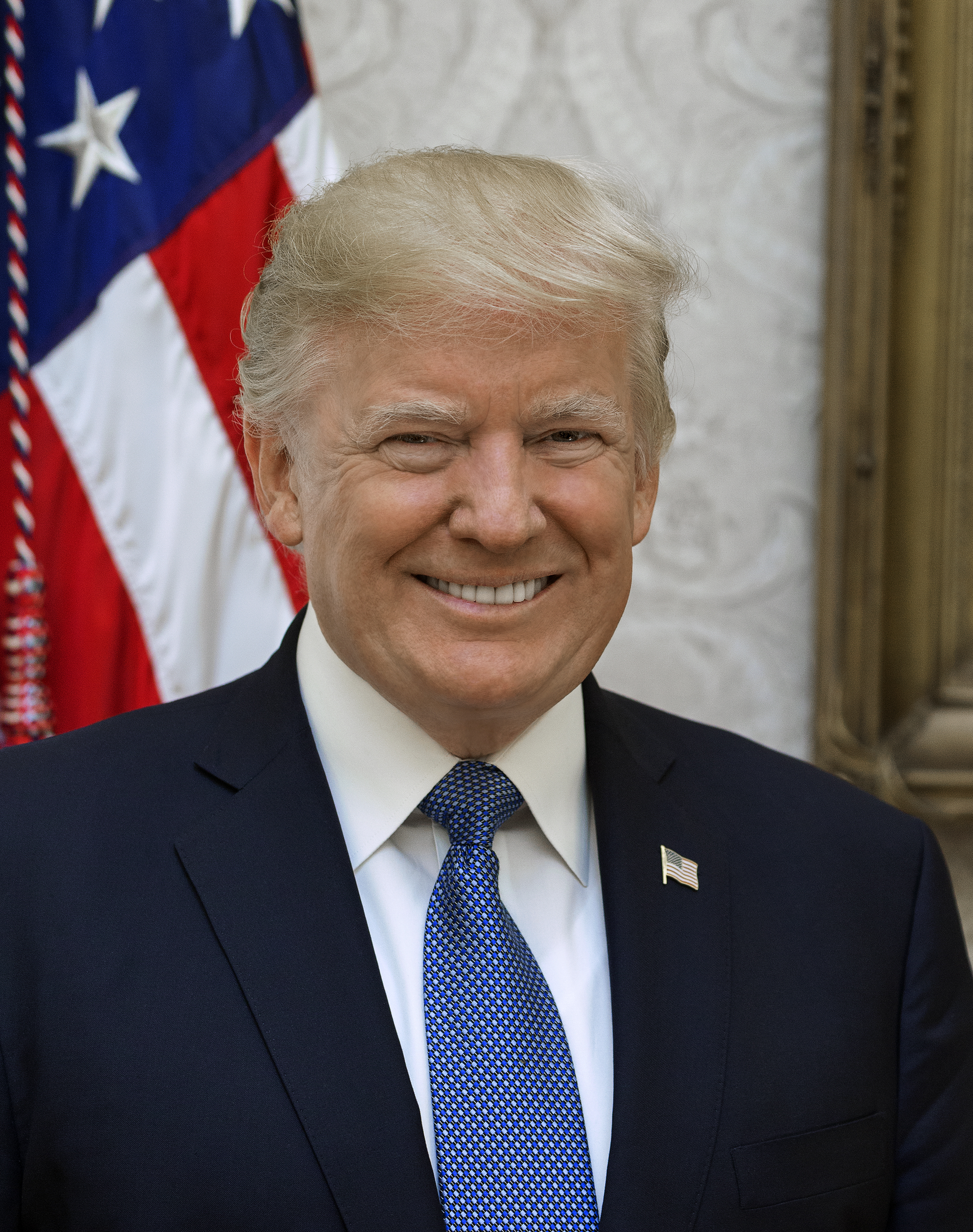
United States
Donald Trump, President

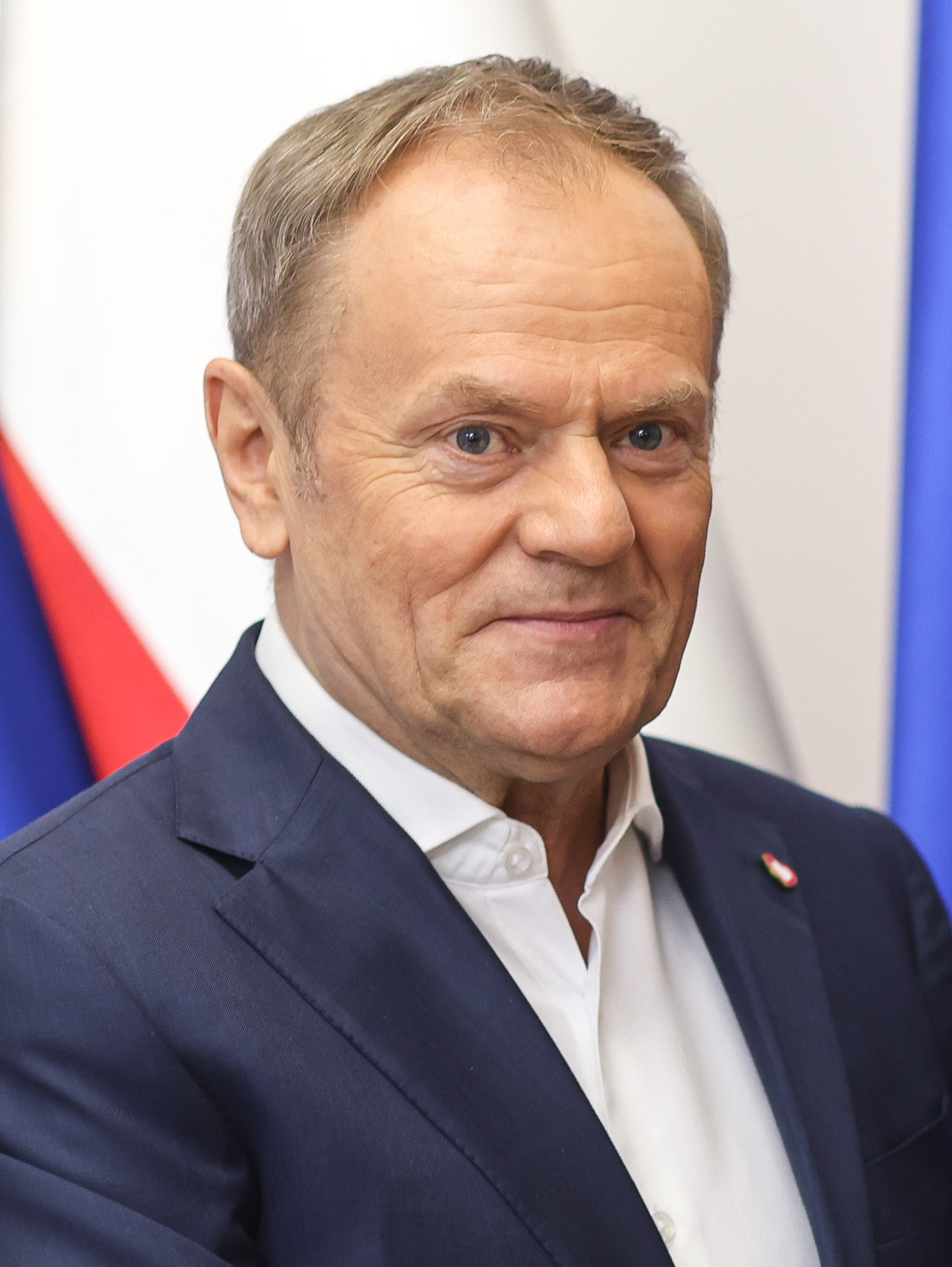
European Union
Donald Tusk, President of the European Council

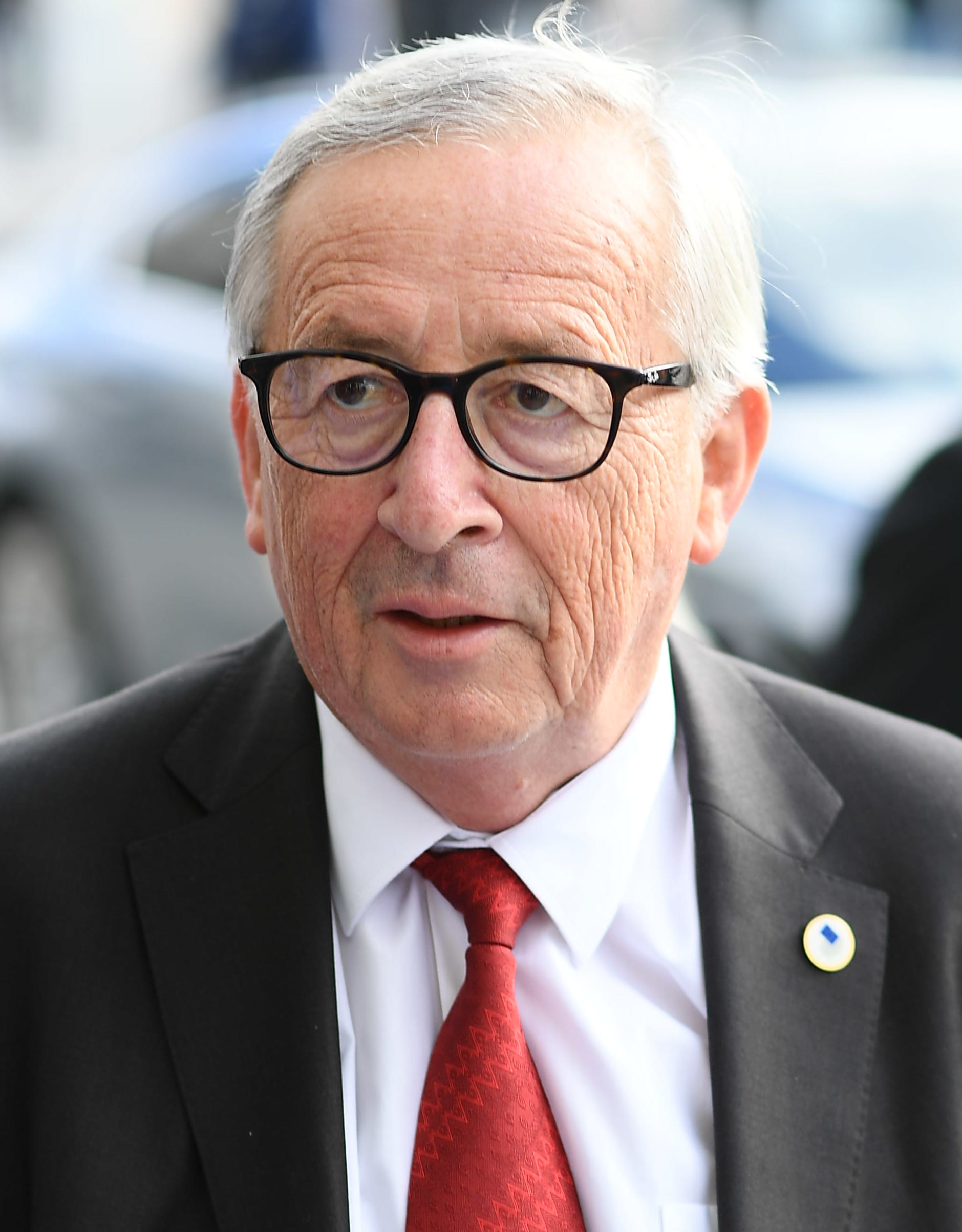
European Union
Jean-Claude Juncker, President of the European Commission

== Invited guests ==
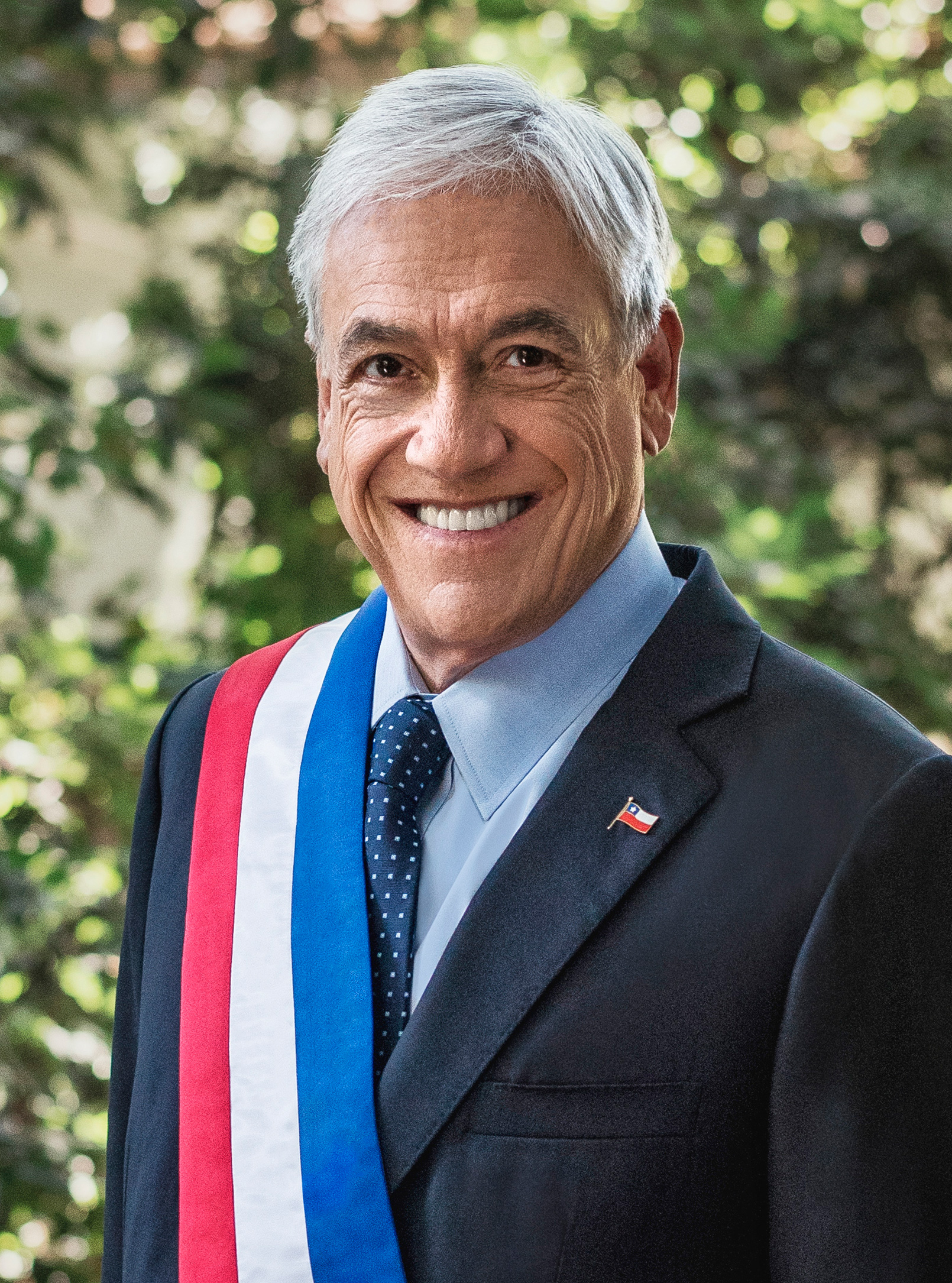
Chile
Sebastián Piñera, President, Chairperson of APEC

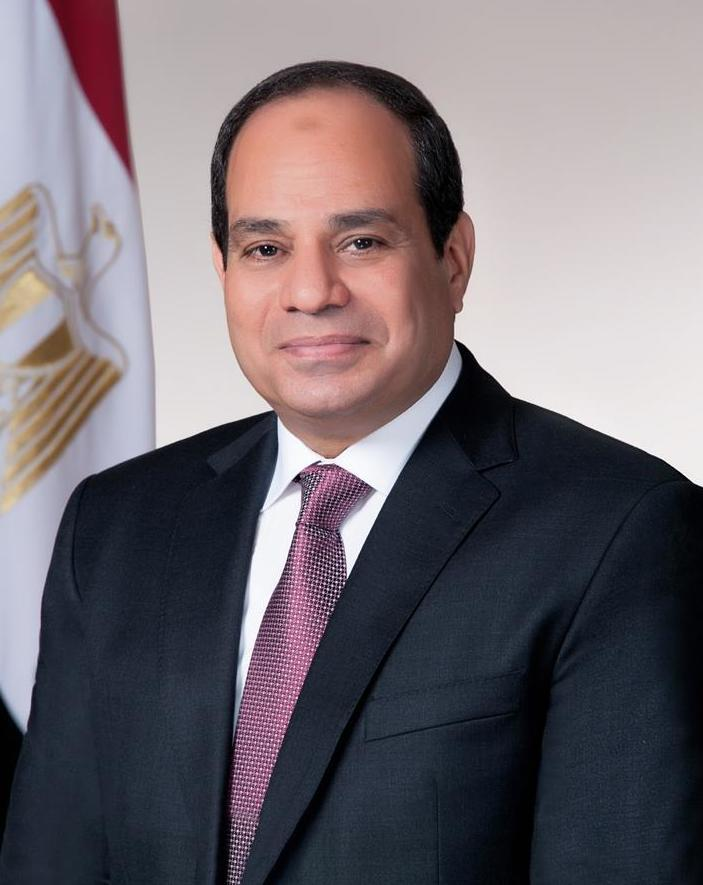
Egypt
Abdel Fattah el-Sisi, President, Chairperson of the African Union

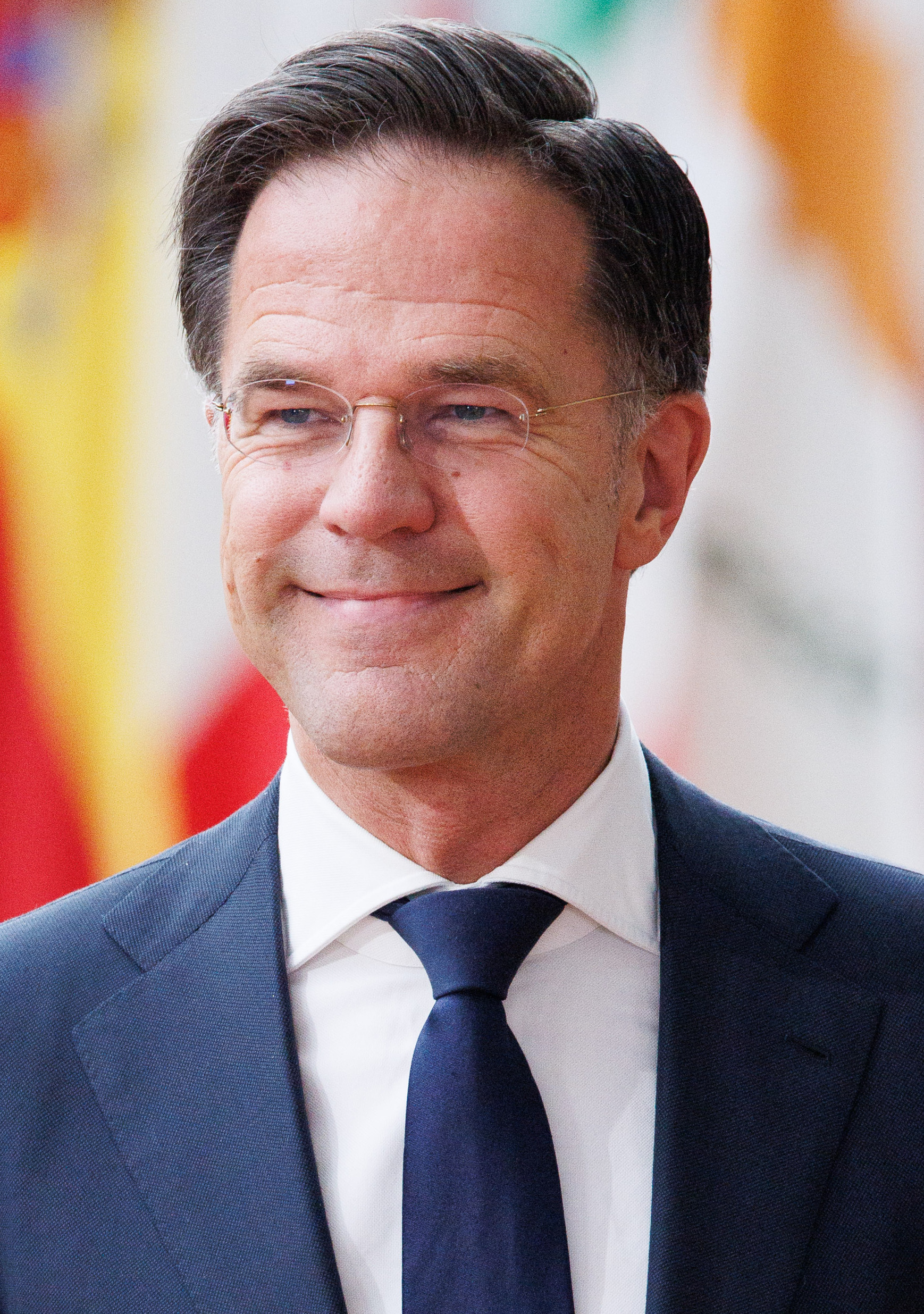
Netherlands
Mark Rutte, Prime Minister
Guest invitee

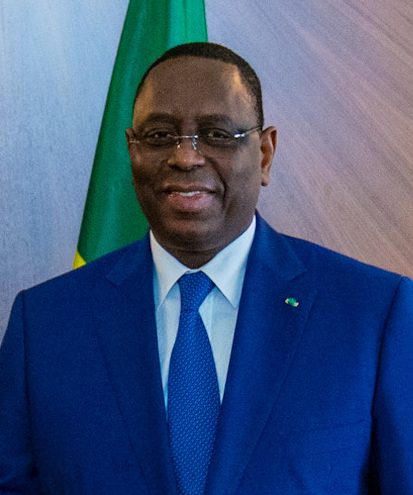
Senegal
Macky Sall, President, Chairperson of NEPAD

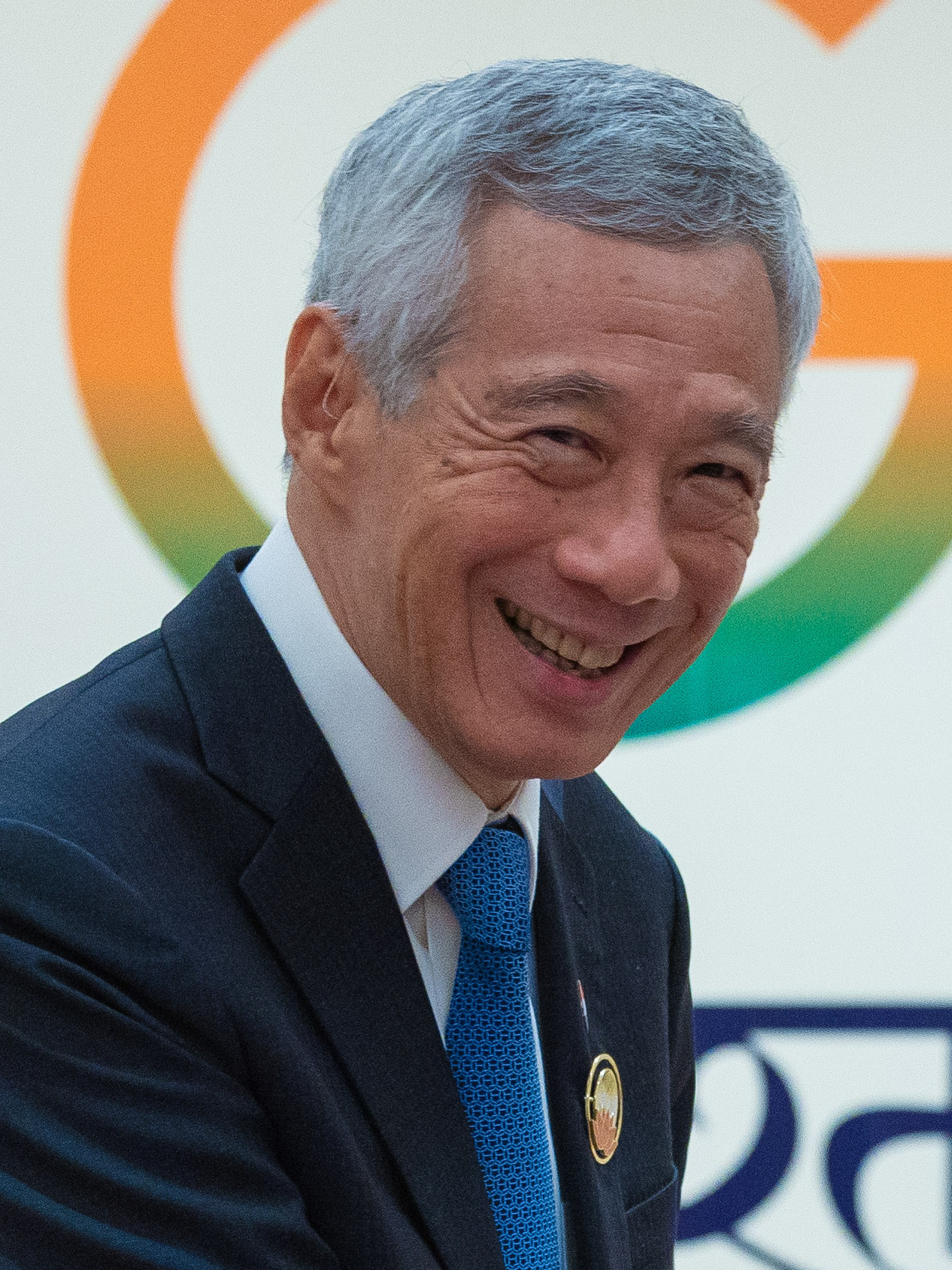
Singapore
Lee Hsien Loong, Prime Minister
Guest invitee

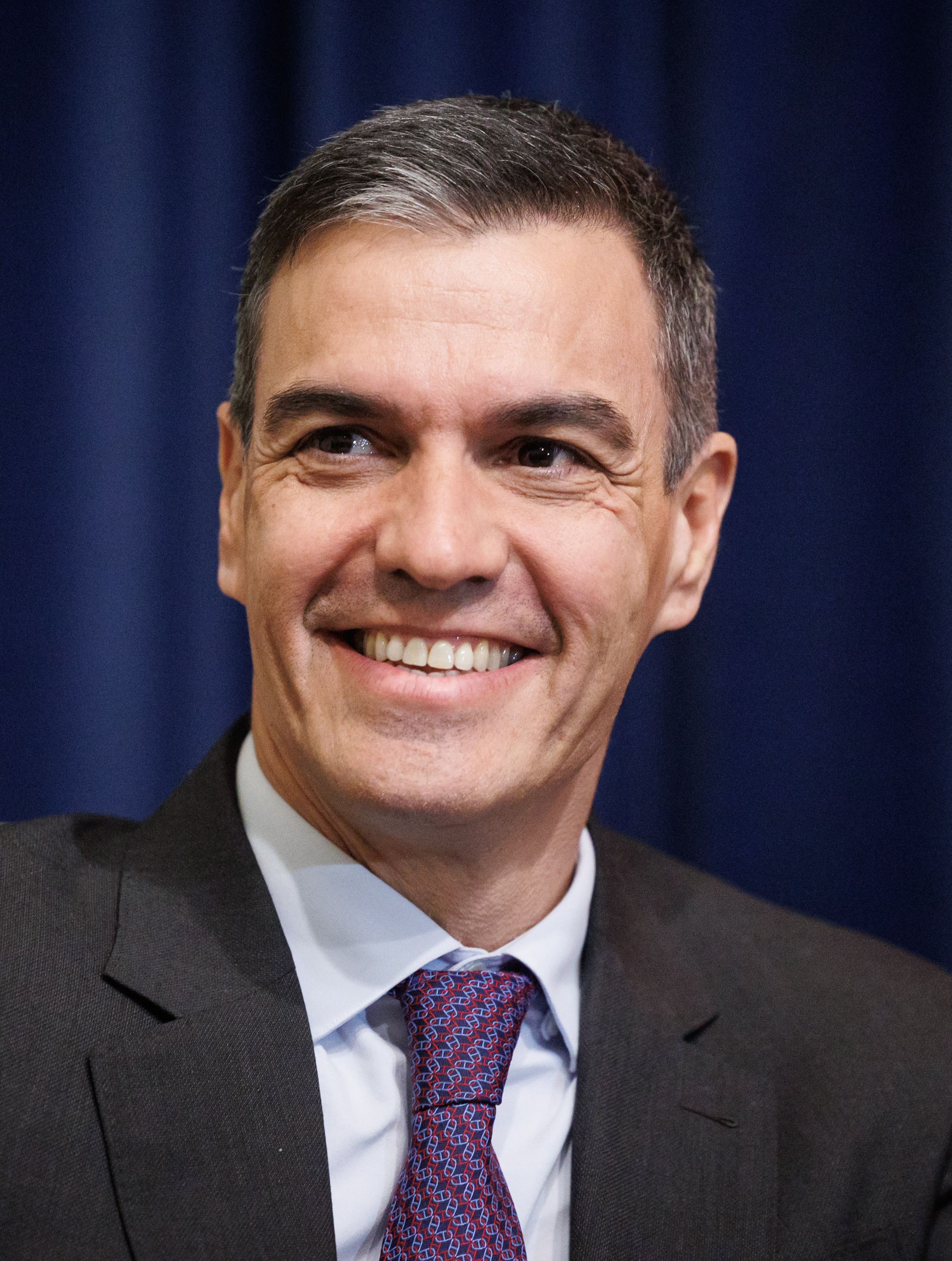
Spain
Pedro Sánchez, Prime Minister
Permanent guest invitee

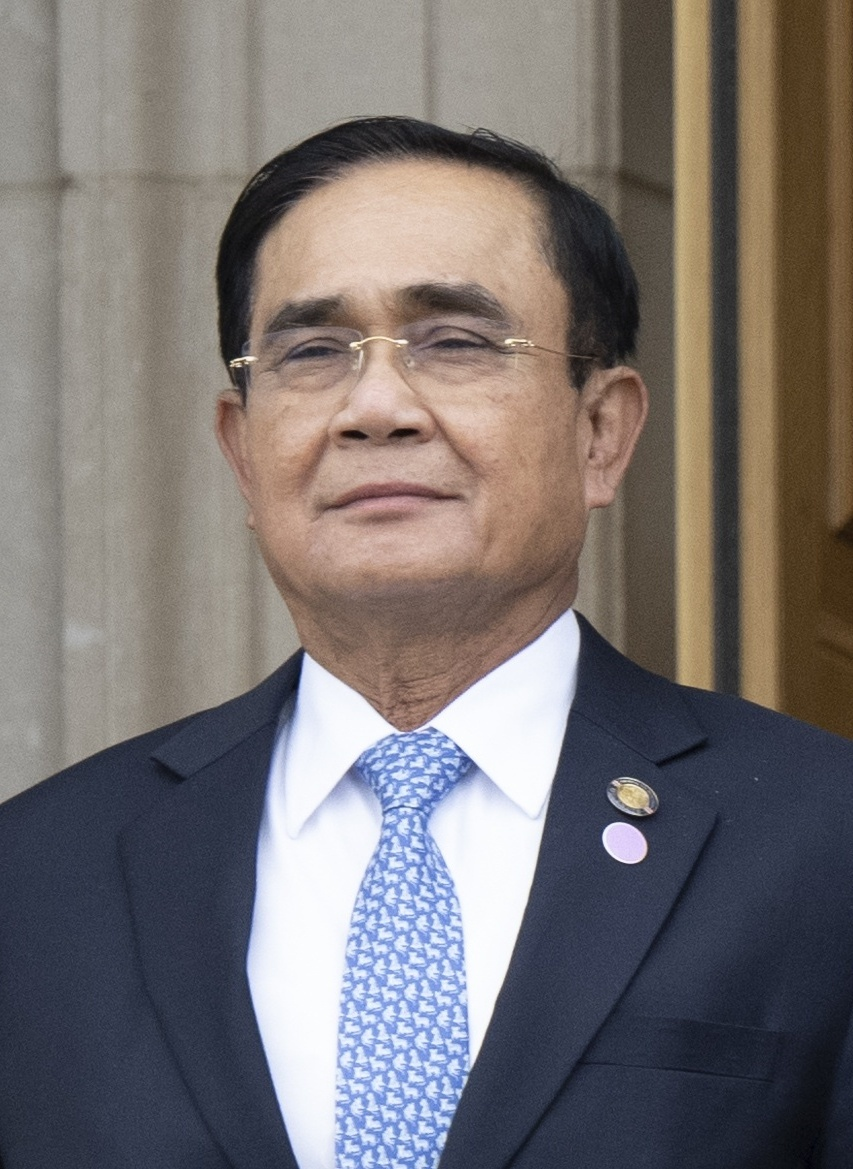
Thailand
Prayut Chan-o-cha, Prime Minister, Chairperson of ASEAN

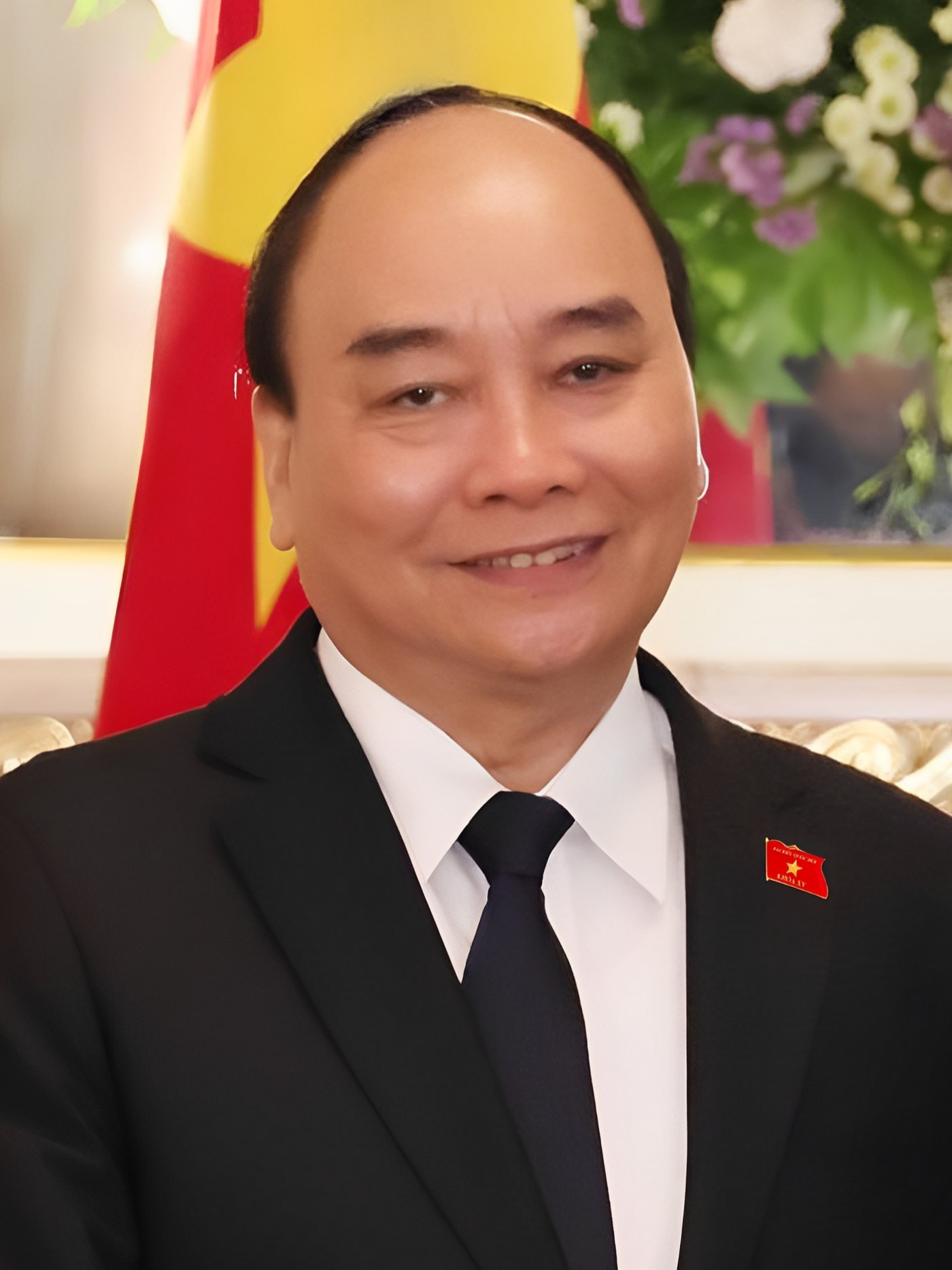
Vietnam
Nguyễn Xuân Phúc, Prime Minister
Guest invitee

== International organization guests ==
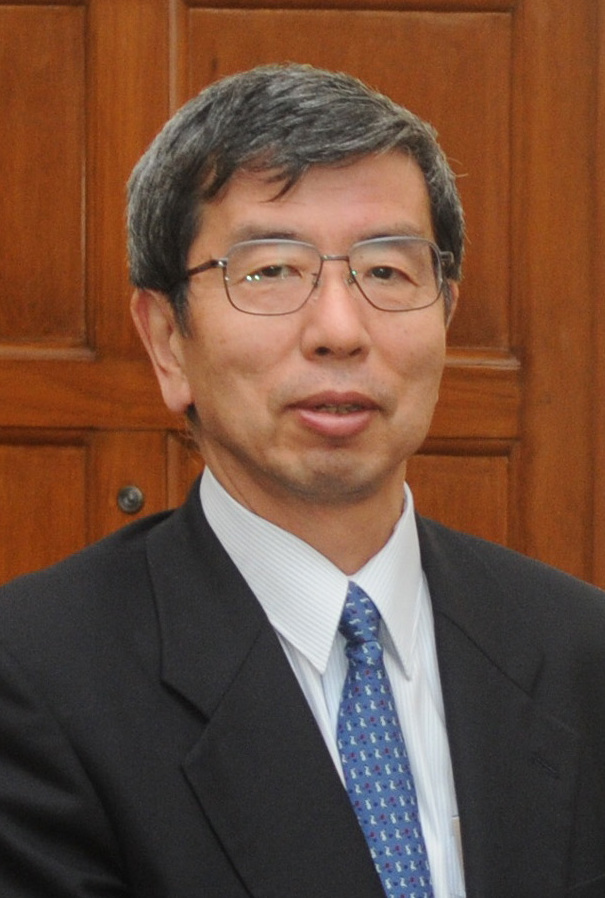
Asian Development Bank
Takehiko Nakao, President

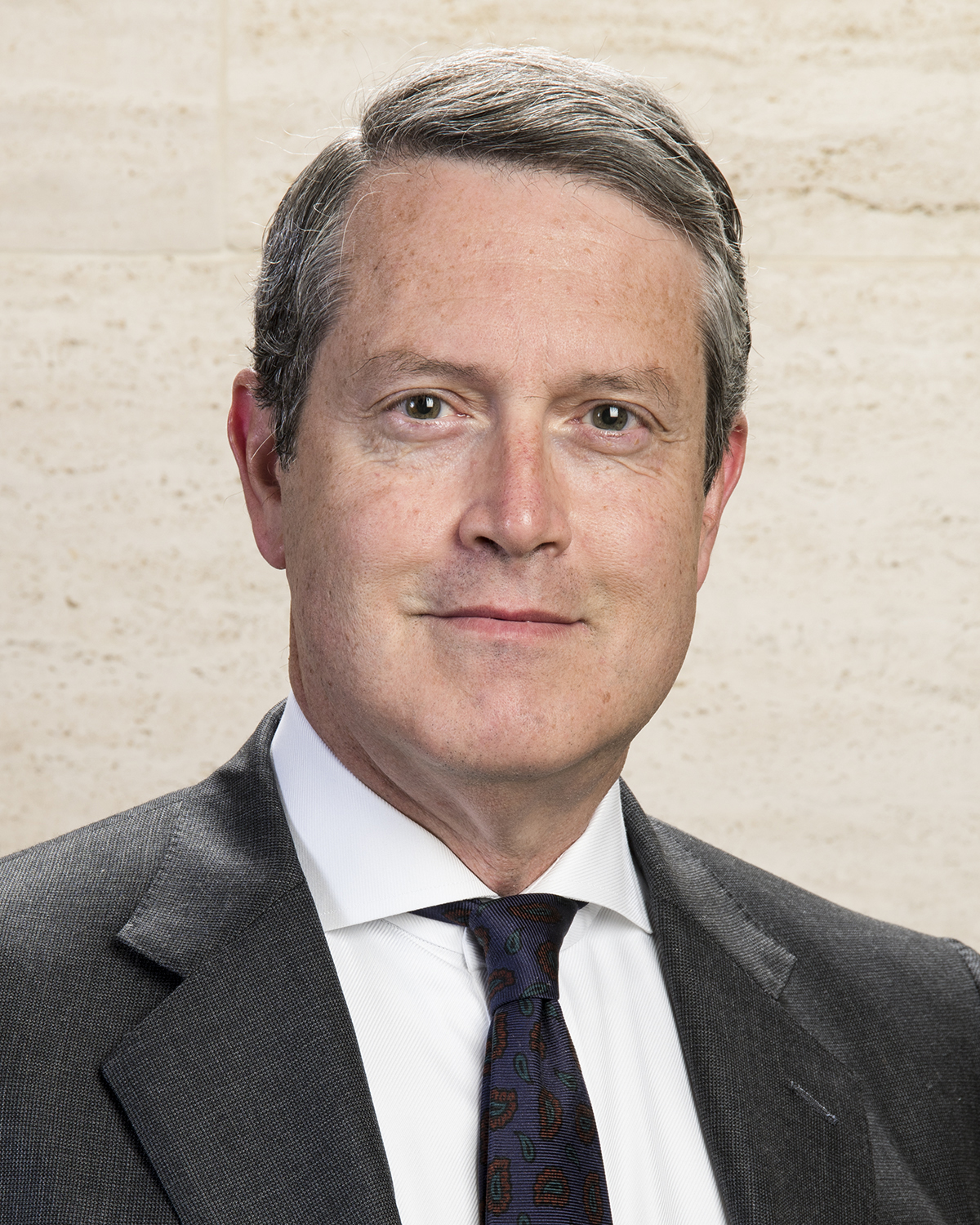
Financial Stability Board
Randal Quarles, President

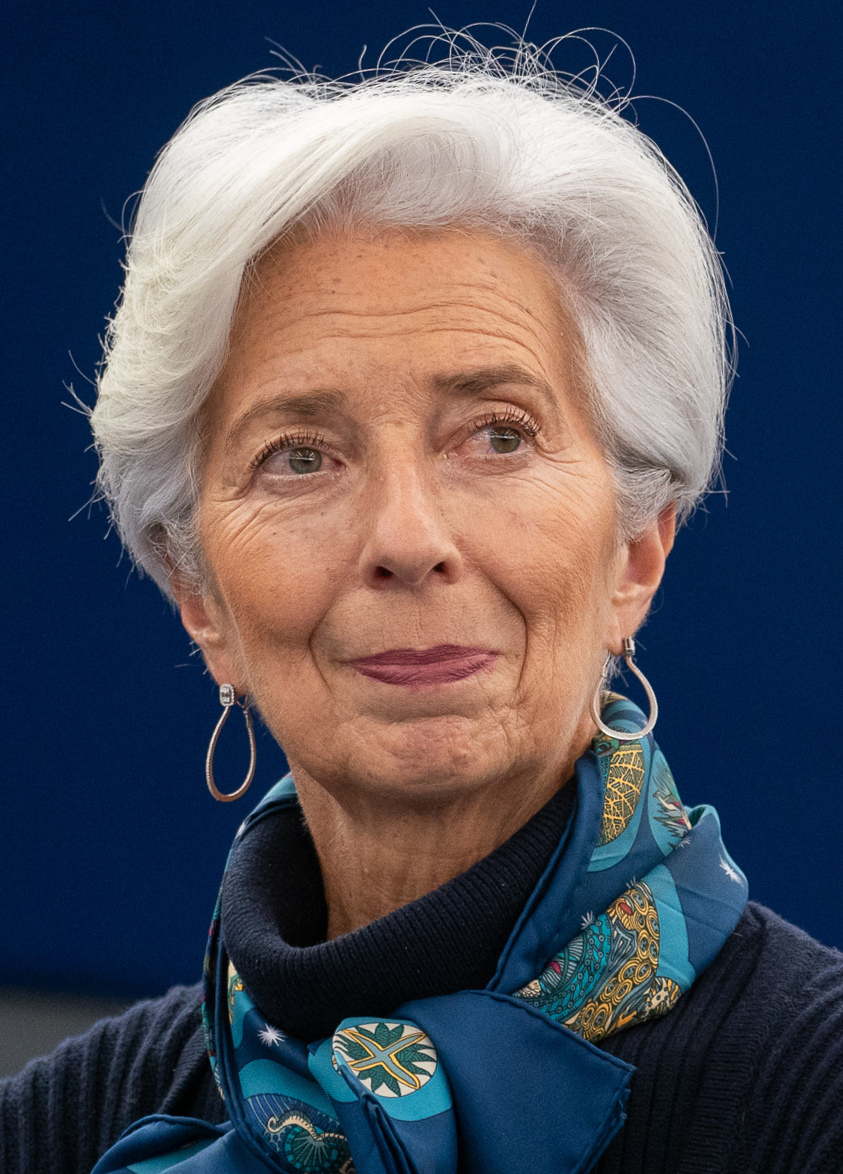
International Monetary Fund
Christine Lagarde, President

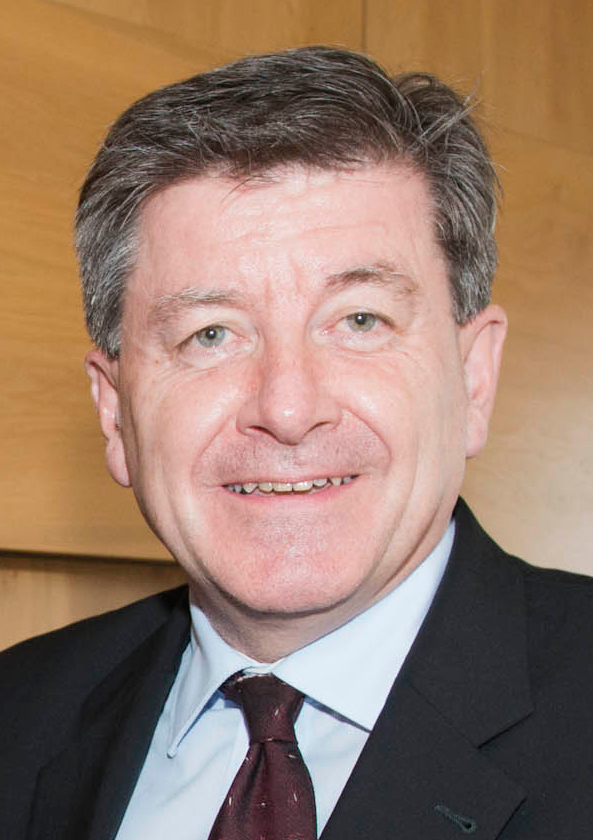
International Labour Organization
Guy Ryder, Director-General

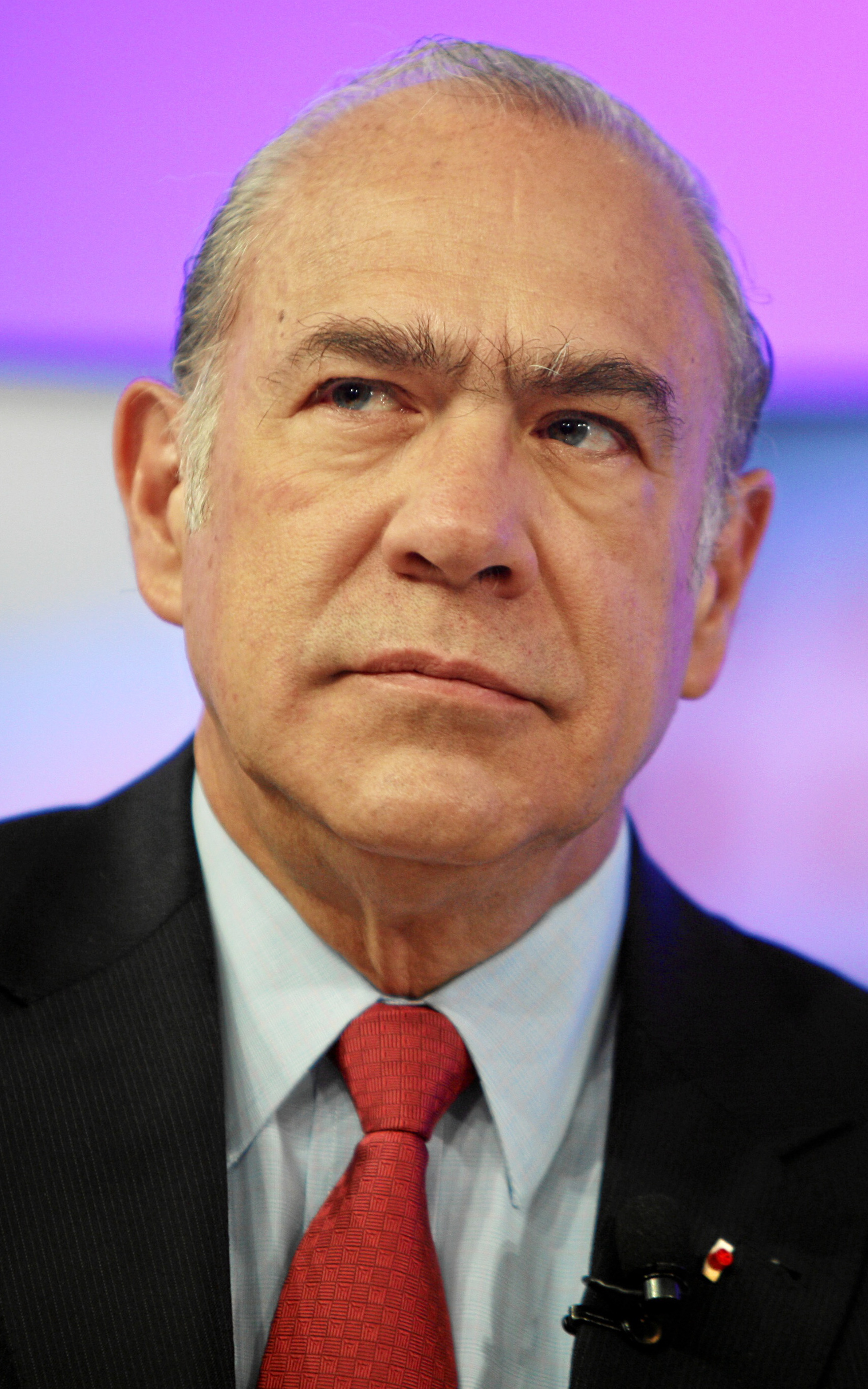
Organisation for Economic Co-operation and Development
José Ángel Gurría, Secretary-General

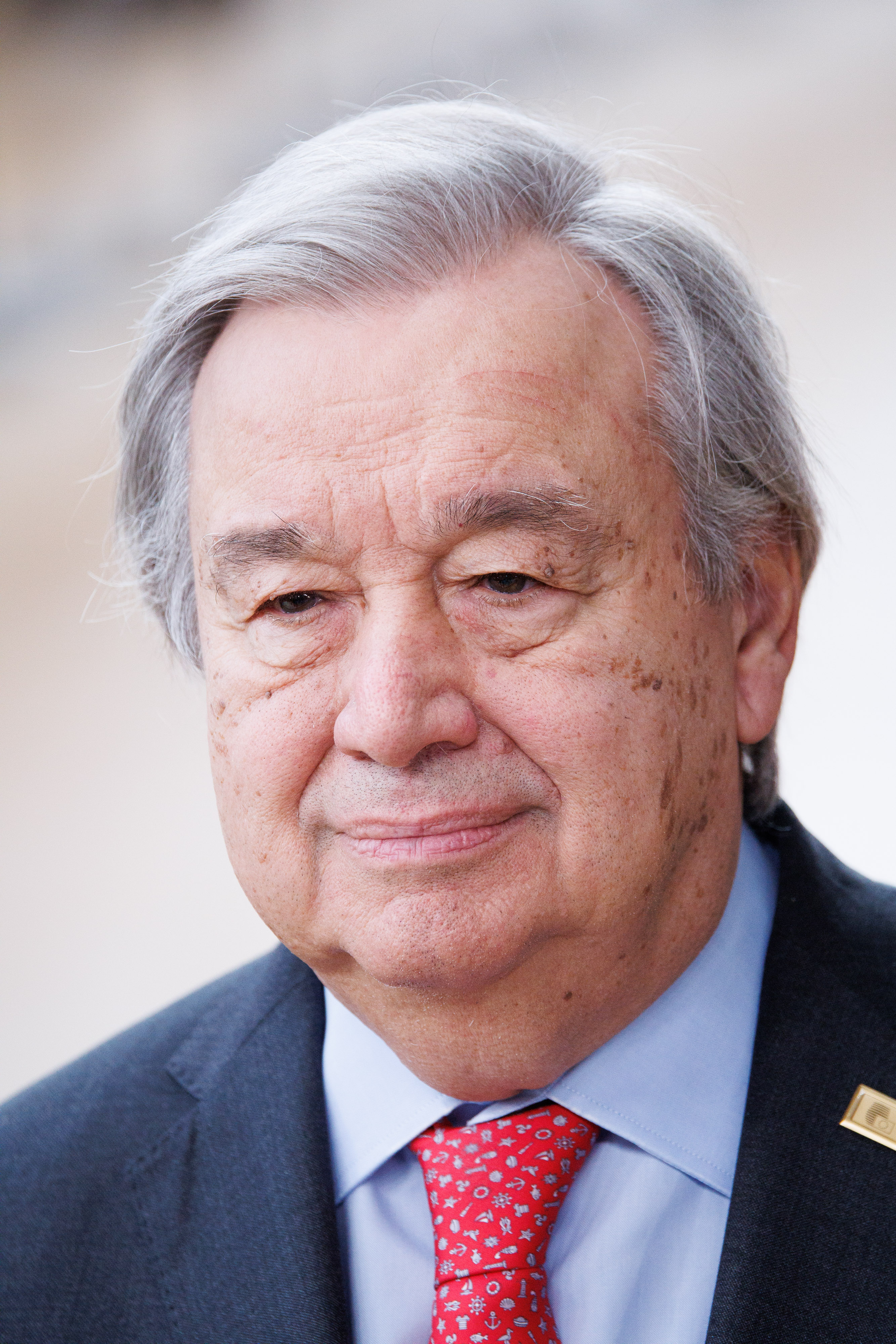
United Nations
António Guterres, Secretary-General

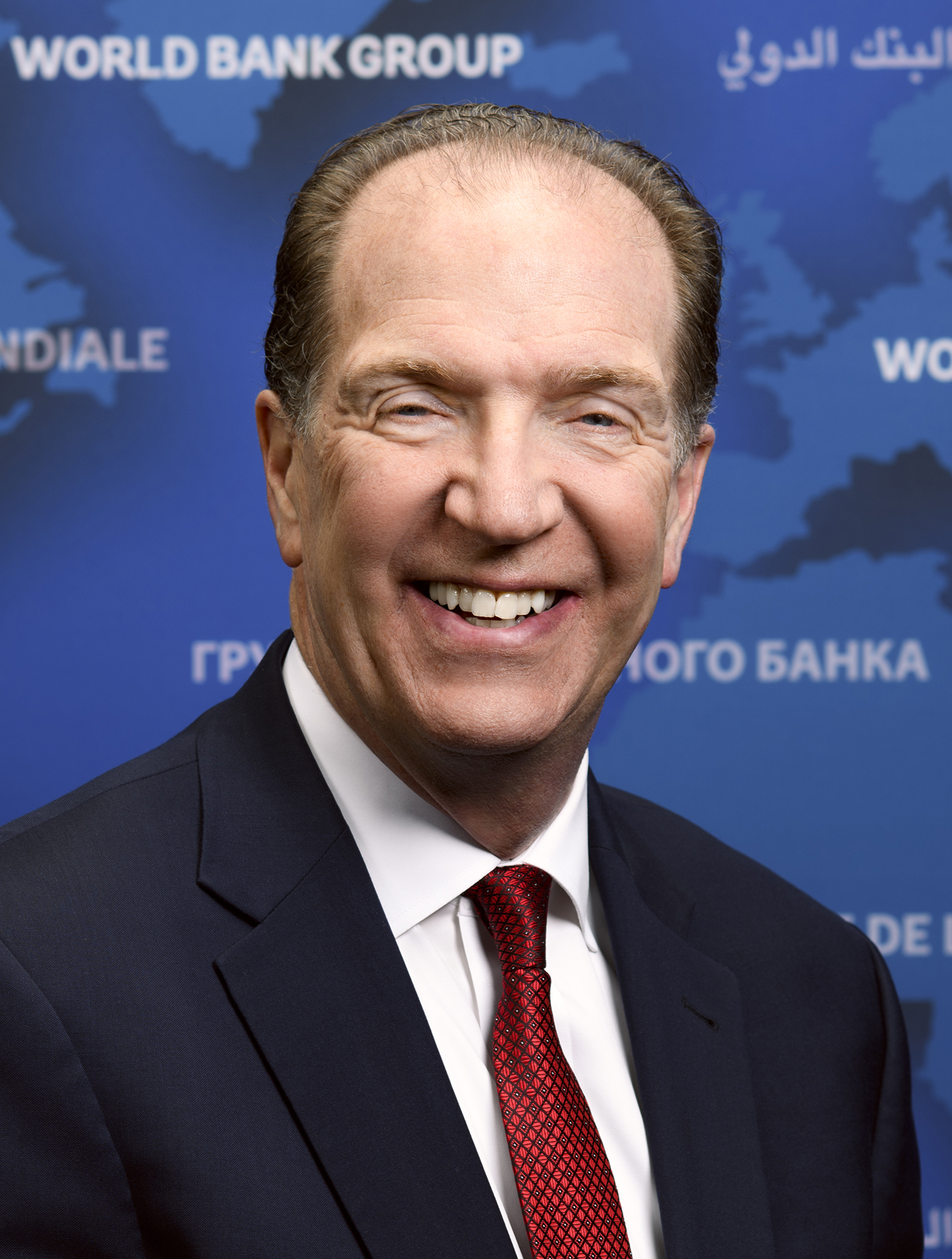
World Bank
David Malpass, President

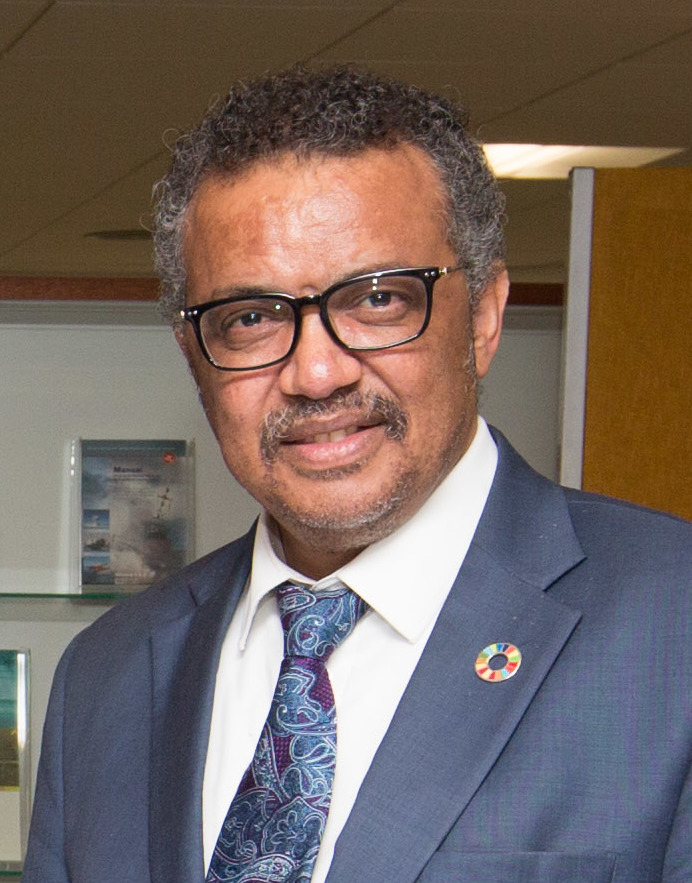
World Health Organization
Tedros Adhanom, Director-General

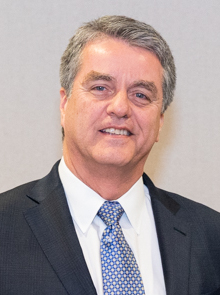
World Trade Organization
Roberto Azevêdo, Director-General

== Issues ==
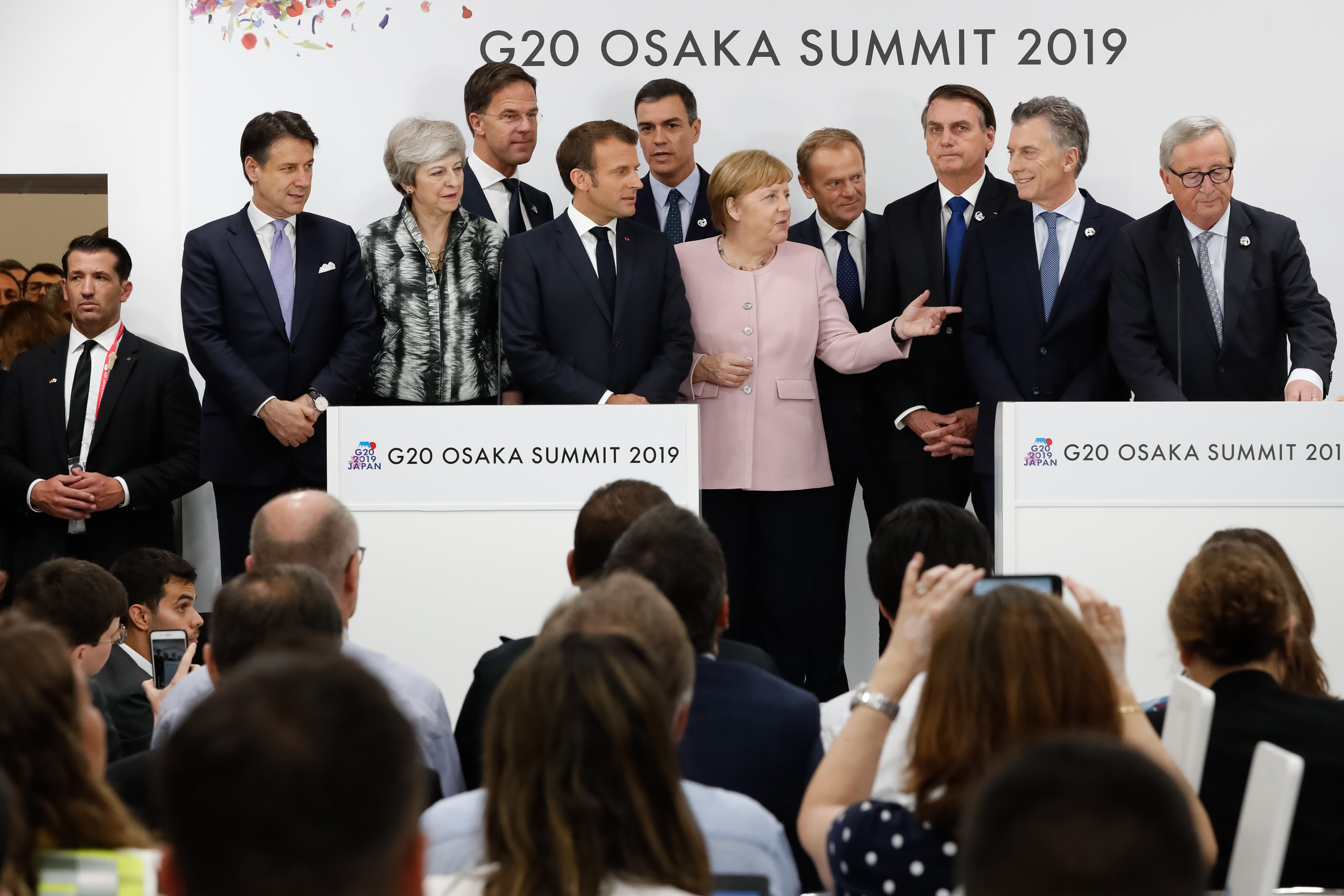
The European Union–Mercosur Free Trade Agreement would form one of the world's largest free trade areas.

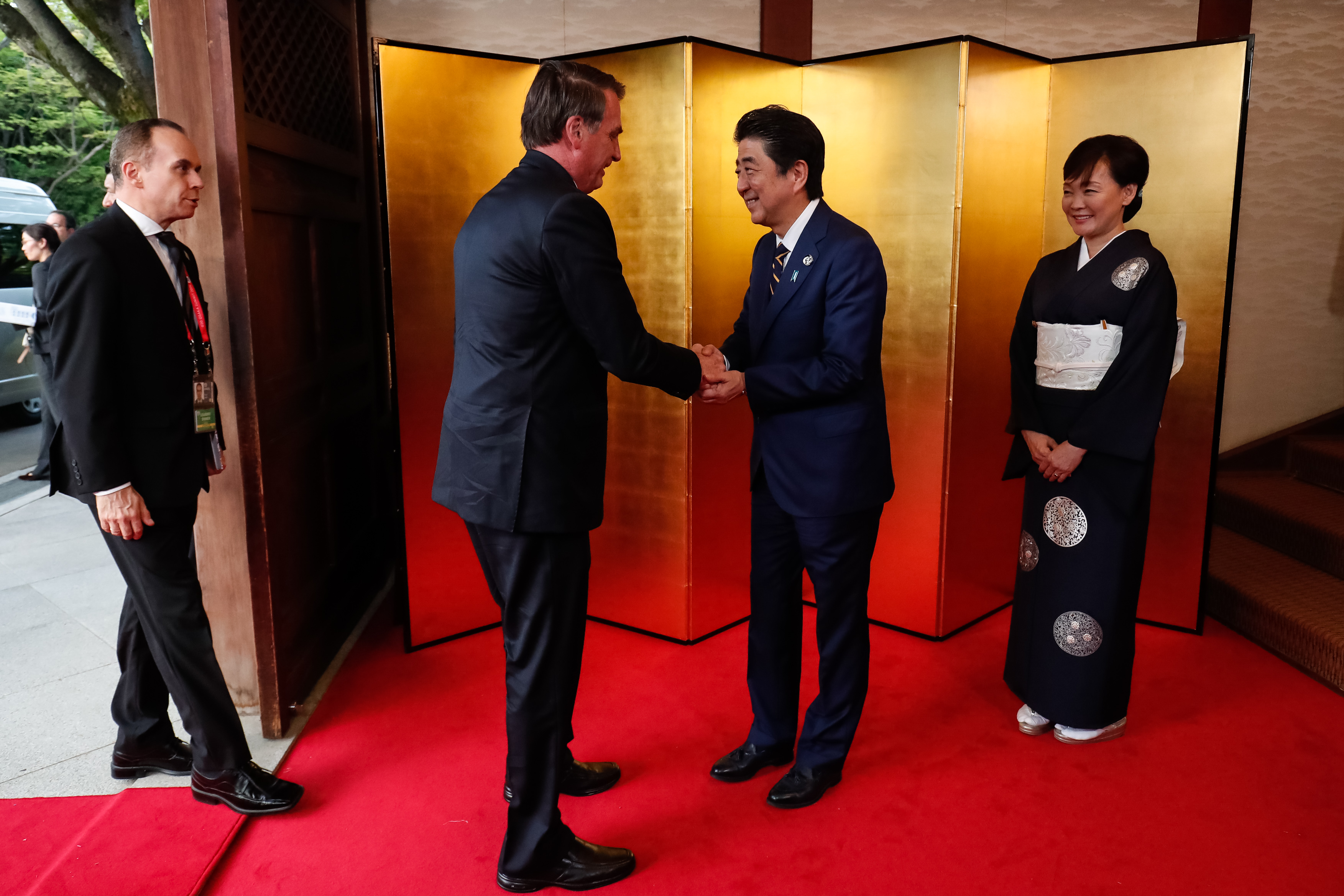
Japanese prime minister Shinzō Abe and his spouse Akie Abe welcoming Brazilian president Jair Bolsonaro for dinner on 28 June at the Osaka State Guest House

The 2019 G20 Summit discussed eight themes to Ensure Global Sustainable Development. The eight themes were "Global Economy", "Trade and Investment", "Innovation", "Environment and Energy", "Employment", "Women's Empowerment", "Development" and "Health".

Regards to "Trade and Investment", support for the necessary reform of the World Trade Organization (WTO) was agreed. WHO Director-General Roberto Azevêdo had been participating in the summit, welcomed the communique.

Regards to "Innovation", necessity of respected and interoperable frameworks on Data Free Flow with Trust, both domestic and international, was discussed. IBM were invited to speak about how emerging technologies such as AI can unlock data to solve some of the most pressing societal and economical problems across the G20 nations.

Regards to "Environment and Energy", a common global vision, the "Osaka Blue Ocean Vision" which is aiming to reduce additional pollution by marine plastic litter to zero by 2050 through a comprehensive life-cycle approach was shared.

Leaders' Special Event was also held, and "Digital Economy" and "Women’s Empowerment" were discussed. During the former event, "Osaka Declaration on Digital Economy" was issued, in which those leaders declared the launch of the "Osaka Track", a process which demonstrates their commitment to promote efforts on international rule-making on digital economy, especially on data flow and electronic commerce. Regards to the latter event, a press release compiling the messages from the leaders on their national measures and commitment regarding women's empowerment was issued after the event.

== Related topics ==
The Ministry of Foreign Affairs of the People's Republic of China has issued a statement considering the Hong Kong Protests as China's internal affairs on June 24. The Chinese government wanted to delist the Hong Kong issue from the summit's agenda for the year, to avoid possible political and security confrontations between all G20 leaders (from outside China) and China. China has threatened to attack G20 nations suspected for “wrongfully” accusing China. However, Japanese Prime Minister Abe had raised the issue to President Xi just before the official summit, while some Hong Kong citizens protested in places around the summit venue. Pro-independence leader Chan Ho-tin demonstrated with people from Chinese ethnic minorities like Rebiya Kadeer for Hong Kong, as well as Xinjiang issues.

On June 29, President of the United States Donald Trump offered North Korea's Kim Jong-un a weekend meeting in the demilitarized zone, and the 2019 Koreas–United States DMZ Summit was realized.

== See also ==
- List of G20 summits
