= Tenrinkaku =

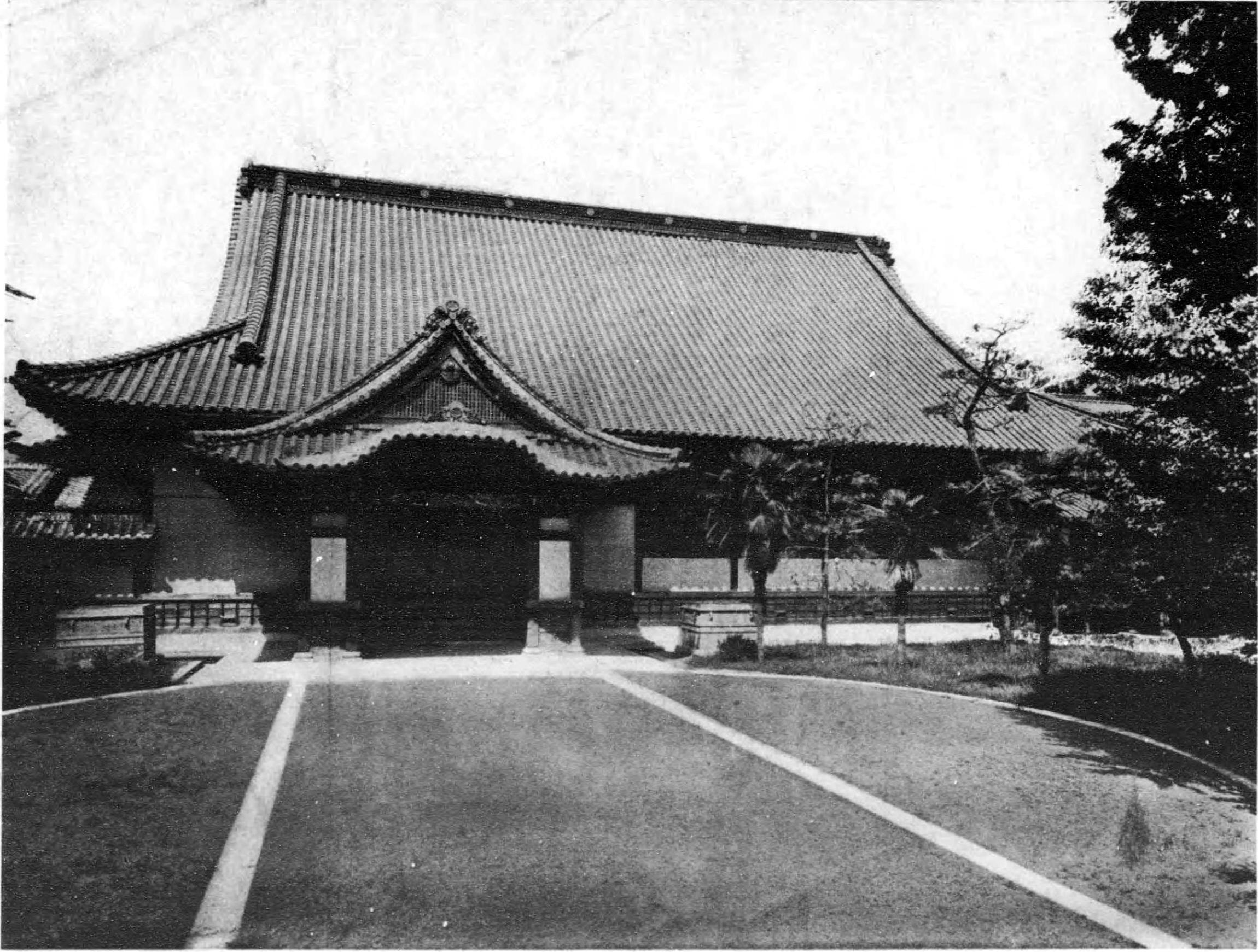
The Kishū Palace, later known as Tenrinkaku (photo Taishō 3, 1914)

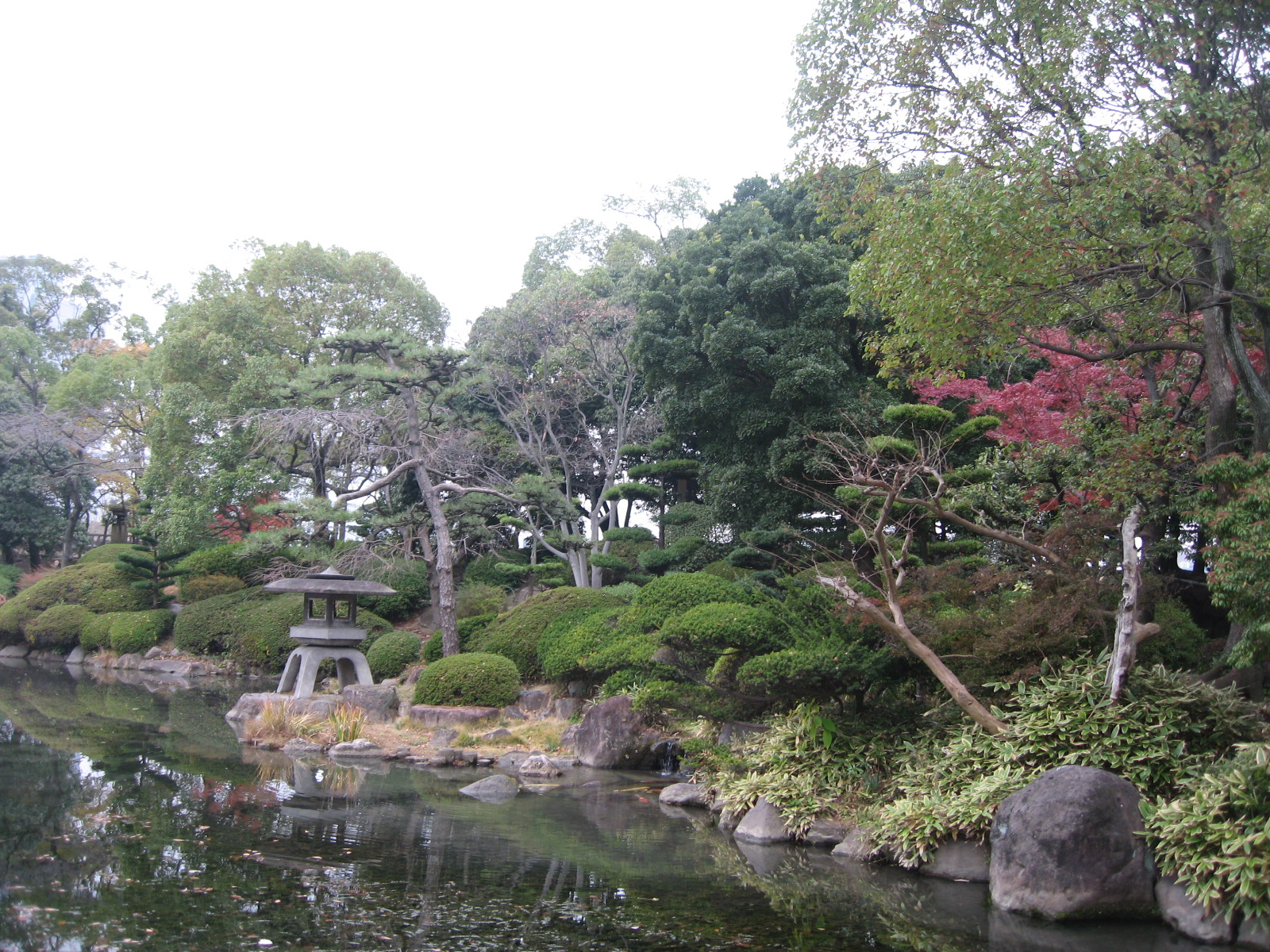
Crane Pond (Tsuru no ike) of the palace

The Tenrinkaku (天臨閣) was a shoin structure at Osaka Castle. It was initially known as the Kishū Palace (紀州御殿 Kishū Goten).

== History ==
The Ninomaru Palace of Wakayama Castle was constructed in Genwa 7 (1621) shortly after the Momoyama period.

The Honmaru Palace of Osaka Castle was destroyed by fire during the Boshin War in Keio 4 (1868).

Various structures from the Wakayama Castle Ninomaru Palace such as the Hakushoin, Kuroshoin, and Tozamurai were transferred to Osaka Castle Honmaru in Meiji 18 (1885). Named the Kishū Palace due to its origin, it served as the administrative centre for the army's 4th Division's administrative centre beginning in Meiji 21 (1888).

It served as the Osaka City State Guest House. A Japanese garden was also created at that time that included the tsuru no ike (Crane Pond). Emperor Meiji stayed here. Emperor Hirohito stayed there in Shōwa 7 (1932). The Kishū Palace was renamed Tenrinkaku in Shōwa 8 (1933).

It was destroyed on September 22, Shōwa 9 (1947) in a fire.

== See also ==
- Osaka State Guest House
- Buntenkaku
