= Osaka State Guest House =

Coordinates: 34.6881°N 135.5229°E

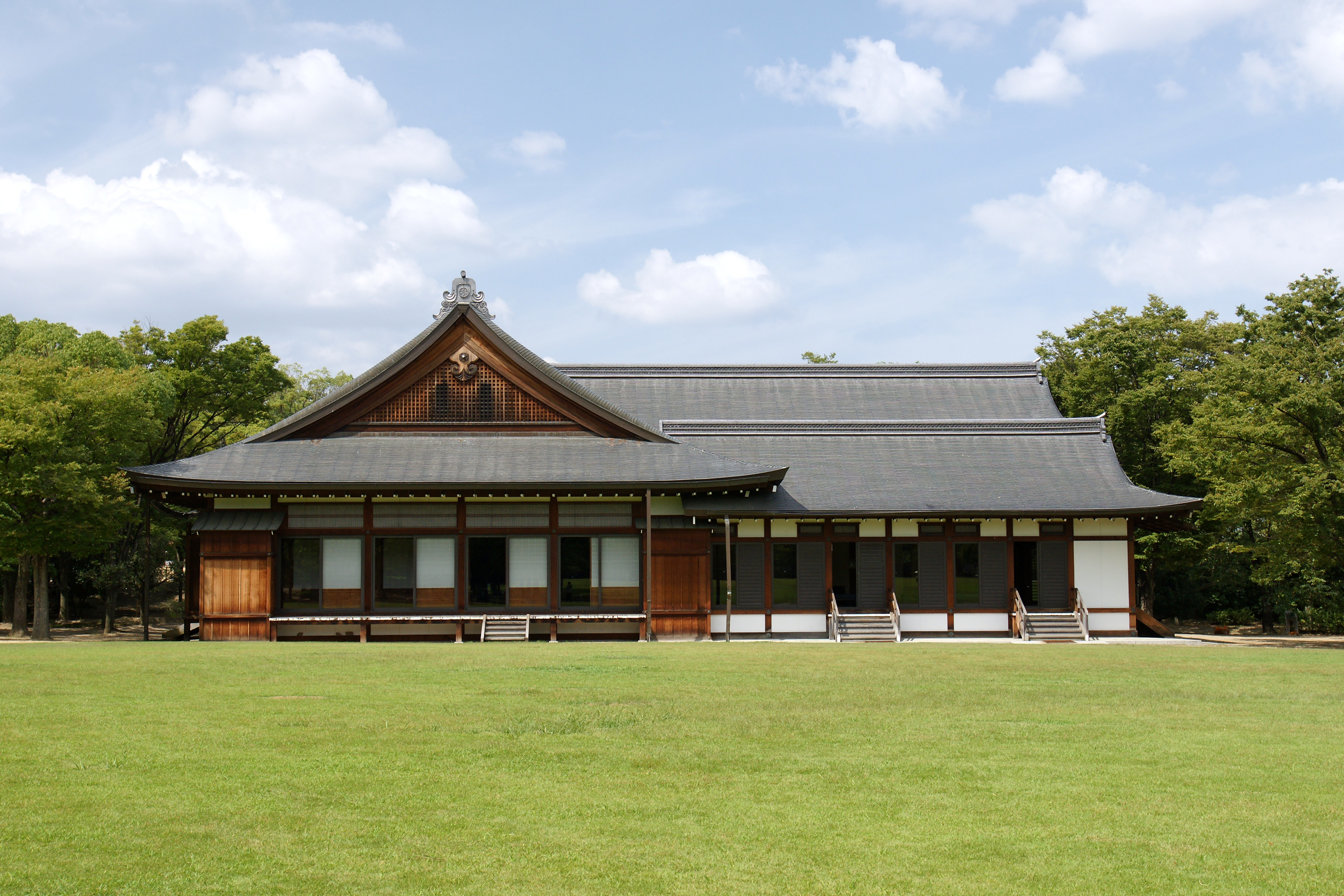
Osaka State Guest House

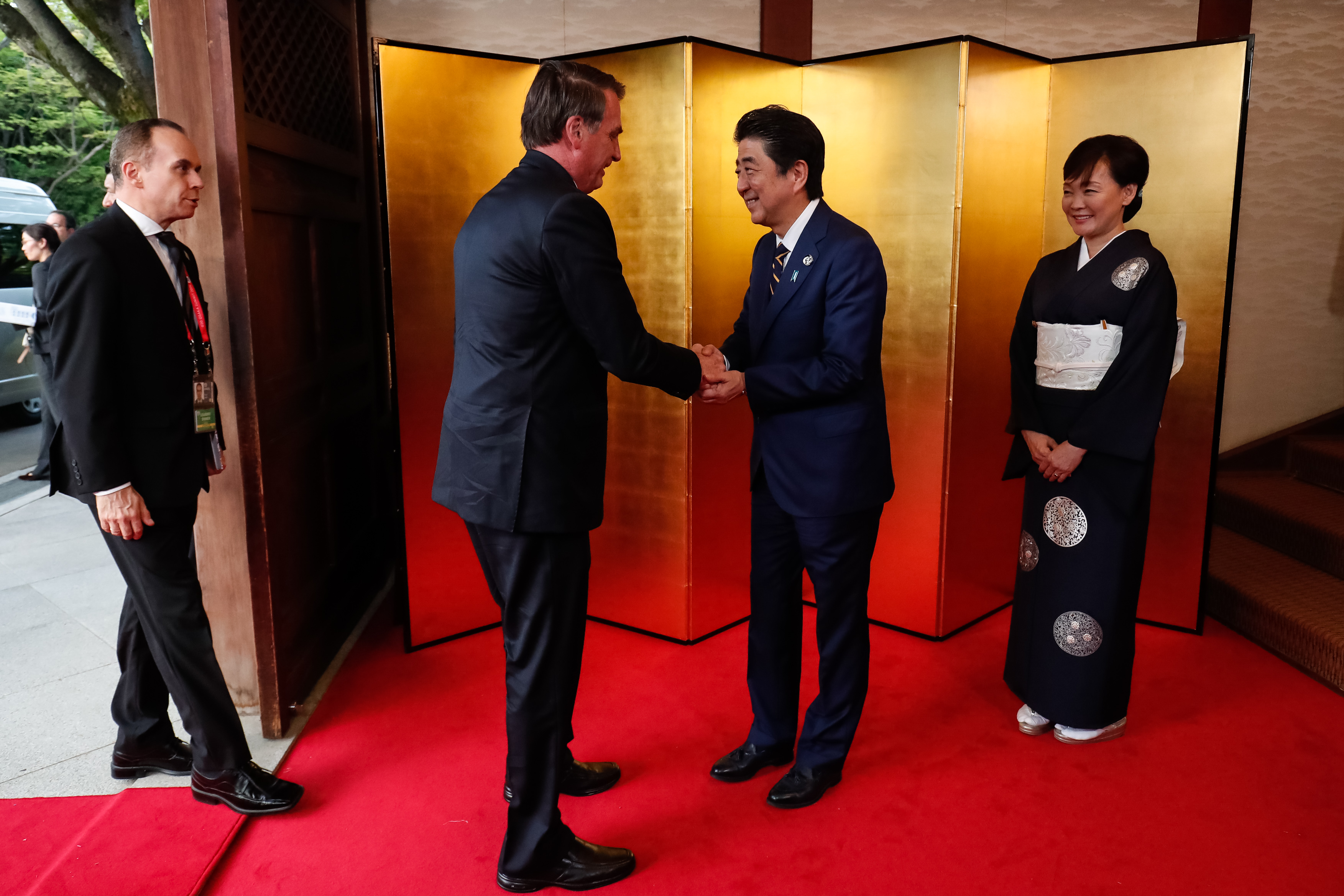
Japanese prime minister Abe Shinzō and his spouse Abe Akie welcoming Brazilian president Jair Bolsonaro at the 2019 G-20 summit at the Osaka State Guest House

The Osaka State Guest House (大阪迎賓館 Ōsaka geihinkan) is located in the Nishinomaru area of Osaka Castle. The building is owned by City of Osaka, managed by Osaka Castle Management Consortium, and operated by Value Management.

It was constructed on the site of an aging rest area in Osaka Castle Park before the 1995 Asia-Pacific Economic Cooperation summit and was used as an unofficial meeting place, and also hosted the 2019 G20 Osaka summit dinner on 28 June. Note that although this APEC meeting was effectively an official meeting, it was treated as an unofficial meeting because representatives from China, Hong Kong, and Taiwan attended. The building's architecture is in the traditional style and part of it is currently used as a restaurant by reservation only.

The building is used for MICE tourism.

Next to it is the Hōshō-an (豊松庵) chashitsu.

Map

== See also ==
- Tenrinkaku
