= Gozen =

Gozen (御前) is a Japanese term meaning "young lady" or "young lord". It is sometimes applied as a title for female warrior samurai. It may refer to:

== Japanese women ==
- Aya-Gozen (1524–1609), first wife of Japanese clan leader Nagao Masakage and mother of daimyō Uesugi Kagekatsu
- Hangaku Gozen (fl.1201), female samurai warrior who took a prominent role in the Kennin Rebellion
- Shizuka Gozen (1165–1211), Japanese court dancer and mistress of Minamoto no Yoshitsune
- Tokiwa Gozen (1123–c. 1180), Japanese noblewoman, mother of Minamoto no Yoshitsune
- Tomoe Gozen (c. 1157–1247), female, possibly fictional, samurai warrior, a concubine of Minamoto no Yoshinaka
- Tsuchida Gozen (died 1594), wife of warlord Oda Nobuhide and mother of warlord Oda Nobunaga
- Fujishiro Gozen (16th-century), female samurai warrior and ruler of Fujishiro castle.
- Oni Gozen (16th-century), female warrior from Hoashi clan in Kyushu.

== Other ==
- Gozen or Goose Van Schaick (1736–1789), Continental Army officer in the American Revolutionary War
