= Itagaki =

Itagaki (板垣; 'board fence') is a Japanese surname.

== People with the name ==
- Hiroshi Itagaki (板垣 宏志; born 1945), Japanese ski jumper
- Keisuke Itagaki (板垣 恵介; born 1957), Japanese manga artist
- Kōichi Itagaki (born 1947), Japanese amateur astronomer
- Mizuki Itagaki (板垣 瑞生; 2000–2025), Japanese actor, fashion model, and singer
- Itagaki Nobukata (板垣 信方; 1489–1548), one of the Twenty-four Generals of Takeda Shingen during the Sengoku period
- Paru Itagaki (板垣 巴留; born 1993), Japanese manga artist
- Rihito Itagaki (板垣 李光人; born 2002), Japanese actor and model
- Seishirō Itagaki (板垣 征四郎; 1885–1948), World War II Imperial Japanese army general
- Itagaki Taisuke (板垣 退助; 1837–1919), Meiji period political leader
- Tomonobu Itagaki (板垣 伴信; 1967–2025), Japanese video game designer
- Hangaku Gozen, Japanese warrior also called Itagaki

== Fictional characters ==
- Manabu and Nanako Itagaki (板垣 学 and 板垣 菜々子), characters from the manga series Hajime no Ippo
