= Kennin Rebellion =

Uprising against the Kamakura shogunate

Date	January–May 1201
Location	Heian-kyō and Echigo Province, Japan
Result	Shogunate victory

Belligerents
Kamakura shogunate	Jo clan

Commanders and leaders
Minamoto no Yoriie; Sasaki Moritsuna	Jo Nagamochi (executed); Jo Sukemori (MIA); Hangaku Gozen (POW)

Strength
Unknown	Unknown (Heian-kyō) c. 1,000 (Echigo)

Casualties and losses
Unknown	High

The Kennin Rebellion was an uprising against the Kamakura shogunate of Japan, instigated by the Jo clan under Jo Nagamochi in 1201. The initial revolt took place at the capital of Heian-kyō, but was easily crushed, whereupon the shogunate destroyed the Jo clan's remaining forces in Echigo Province. The rebellion is mainly remembered due to the participation of Hangaku Gozen, a female samurai, as commander on the rebel side.

== Background ==
In the 12th century, Japan experienced a period of political change and conflict, as the powerful Taira and Minamoto clans struggled for control of the country. Their conflict also involved other families, including the Jo clan which was descended from a Taira branch and based in Echigo Province. The rivalry eventually resulted in the Genpei War of 1180–1185 during which the Taira were defeated by the Minamoto. The Jo clan fought alongside the Taira during the war. After his victory over the Taira, Minamoto no Yoritomo established the Kamakura shogunate, which ruled Japan alongside the weakened Imperial Court in Kyoto (then known as "Heian-kyō"). He pardoned the Jo clan, allowing the family's leader Jo Nagamochi to gradually gain the new authorities' trust by assisting the Minamoto in defeating other still-autonomous families such as the Northern Fujiwara. The Jo clan's survival was partially owed to Kajiwara Kagetoki, an influential figure in the government who had been an ally to Jo Nagamochi. Regardless, the Jo clan's power was in sharp decline; accordingly Jo Nagamochi continued to resent the Kamakura shogunate and planned to overthrow it.

In 1199, Minamoto no Yoritomo died in an accident, leaving the Minamoto clan weakened. His young son Minamoto no Yoriie became the clan's formal leader, but true power passed to Yoritomo's wife Hōjō Masako who consequently worked to keep de facto control and strengthen her own family, the Hōjō clan. The rise of the so-called "nun shogun" and attempts by Minamoto no Yoriie to gain more power caused considerable tensions. In 1200, the unrest resulted in the downfall and death of Kajiwara Kagetoki.

== Rebellion ==
Map of Japan showing the locations of the rebellion.

Jo Nagamochi finally took up arms on New Year's Day, January 1201. He exploited the conflicts within the shogunate to raise an army and storm Heian-kyō, hoping to topple the government. At first, he assaulted the mansion of Tomomasa Oyama, an official who had been involved in destroying Kajiwara Kagetoki. However, Tomomasa managed to escape. Nagamochi then attempted to get the imperial court's backing, requesting retired Emperor Go-Toba to issue an official order to depose the Minamoto clan. However, the imperial court did not comply; instead, an army loyal to the shogunate launched an unexpected counter-attack and crushed Jo Nagamochi's force. He tried to hide at Mount Yoshino, but was captured and beheaded.

Minamoto no Yoriie proceeded to order a reliatory attack on the Jo clan's holdings in Echigo. The remaining forces of the Jo clan were led by Jo Nagamochi's nephew Jo Sukemori and sister Hangaku Gozen who prepared as well as they could for the coming governmental operation, resolving to make their last stand. They gathered about 1,000 warriors, with their main base being the wooden fortress of Tossaka Castle (Note: The Jo clan's traditional holding was Tossaka Castle; the fortress is often confused with Torisaka Castle whose name is written almost identically in Japanese.) near modern-day Tainai. After the mountain passes opened following the spring thaw, the shogunate's armies began their offensive against the Echigo-based rebels. In April 1201, Tossaka Castle's garrison repulsed a first attack. The government loyalists were consequently reinforced, with Sasaki Moritsuna assuming command of the shogunate forces. At this point, the government troops vastly outnumbered the rebels.

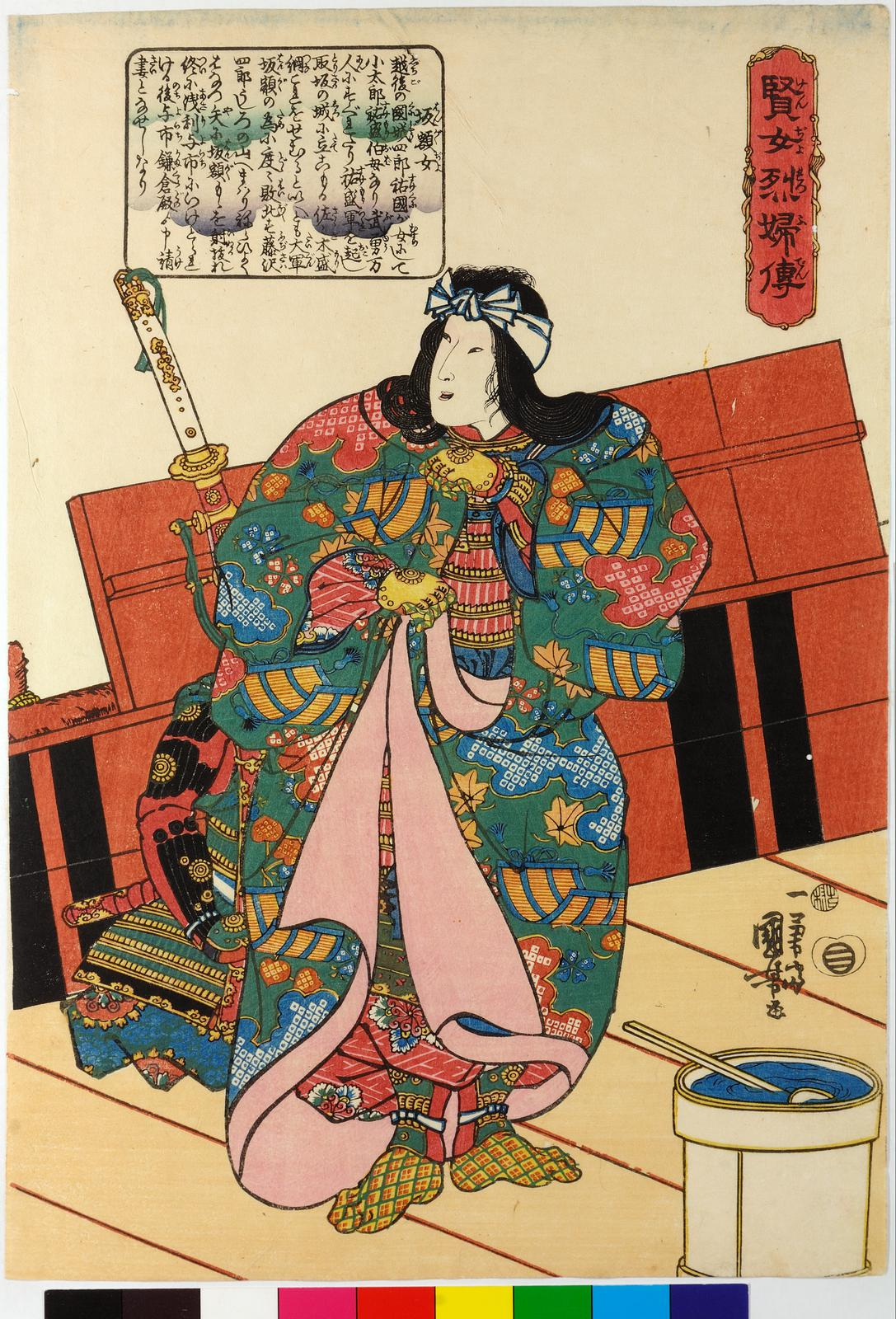
Hangaku Gozen in armour during the rebellion, as portrayed by Utagawa Kuniyoshi around 1842.

Sasaki sent a message to the rebels, and Jo Sukemori agreed to a final fight at Tossaka Castle. The main battle took place in May, as Sukemori's troops fought outside the castle and Hangaku Gozen led the garrison. She proved to be an inspirational and capable leader, as she was already highly respected among her followers for her exceptional archery skills. Dressed like a male samurai in full armour, she led the castle's defense from a tower and killed many attackers with her bow. Later records claimed that she shot one hundred arrows, hitting and killing an opponent each time.

Eventually, a samurai named Fujisawa Kiyochika climbed up a mountain close to the castle, positioned himself at a blindspot to the castle's rear, and shot an arrow at Hangaku Gozen. She was hit in the thigh, with the arrow piercing her legs at a spot unprotected by her armour. Unable to stand, she collapsed. With her wounding, the castle's garrison surrendered on 9 May, and Hangaku Gozen was taken prisoner. Jo Sukemori fled the field. His fate is unclear; it was rumoured that he was able to hide in Dewa Province.

== Aftermath ==
In June 1201, Hangaku Gozen was sent to Kamakura and presented to Minamoto no Yoriie, impressing observers with her fearlessness. Her proud stance was remarkable as being captured alive and being presented as some kind of curiosity to Yoriie would have been extremely humiliating. For her role in the rebellion, she would usually have been ordered to commit ritual suicide (seppuku) or been sentenced to lifelong exile in some remote area. However, a warrior in Yoriie's retinue, Asari Yoichi Yoshitō, was so captivated by Hangaku Gozen's demeanor and bravery that he wished to marry her. Minamoto no Yoriie requested Asari to explain himself, and the samurai reasoned that she would surely have a "strong son who would defend the shogun". Yoriie initially ridiculed him, claiming that Hangaku Gozen was so unwomanly that she surely had "no attraction to men", but his retainer persisted and he relented. Asari and Hangaku Gozen married and later had at least one child. Some tellings of the events claim that it was a son, whereas other historians such as Bun'ei Tsunoda state that it was a girl.

The rebellion of 1201 subsequently became known as the "Kennin Rebellion" due to having taken place mainly during the Kennin era. In coming centuries, the Kennin Rebellion remained a relatively unknown event, mainly remembered due to Hangaku Gozen's involvement. Over time, many legends about her feats and strength sprung up. The city of Tainai erected a statue at Nakajō Station in her memory.
