= Seishin =

Seishin may refer to:

- Seishin-ni, a Japanese Samurai woman
- Chouseishin, a series
- Seishin Joshi, a private school
- Seishin, Korea, now Chongjin, North Korea
- Seishin-Chūō Station, a railway station in Nishi-ku, Kobe, Japan.
