= Uchida Ieyoshi =

Samurai of the Kiso Minamoto Clan

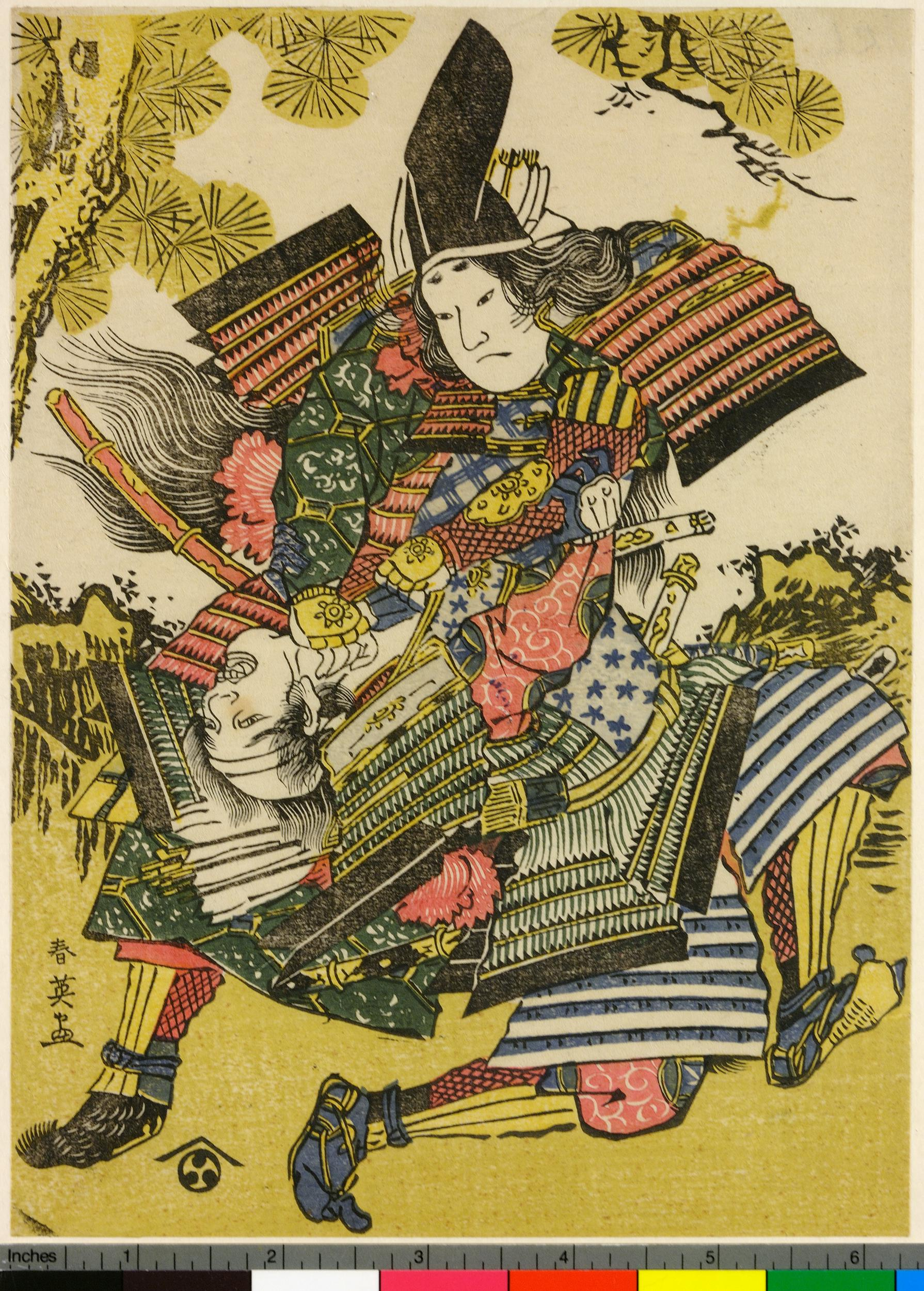
Tomoe overcoming Uchida at the Battle of Awazu in 1184

Uchida Ieyoshi (内田家吉, died 20 January 1184) was a samurai warrior of the Kiso Minamoto clan who was most famous for dying at the hands of Tomoe Gozen, the famous onna-musha, whom he failed to capture in battle at the Battle of Awazu.

In 1184, during the Genpei War, Minamoto no Yoshinaka, head of the Kiso Minamoto clan, betrayed his cousin Minamoto no Yoritomo, head of the Kamakura branch, hoping to capture Emperor Go-Shirakawa. This culminated in the Battle of Awazu between the Kamakura and Kiso, in which Uchida Ieyoshi participated alongside many other warriors such as Minamoto no Yoshitsune and Hatakeyama Shigetada. Uchida Ieyoshi faced down the wife of the enemy leader, Tomoe Gozen, hoping to capture her, alongside Hatakeyama. They charged, but Tomoe swung her katana and slew him.
