= Jinbo Yukiko =

Japanese 19th-century female warrior

- Native name: 神保 雪子
- Noble family: Aizu-Matsudaira
- Spouse: Jinbo Shuri

Jinbo Yukiko (神保 雪子, 1845-October 10, 1868) was a Japanese noble lady, member of the aristocracy, Onna-musha (female warrior) and retainer of the Aizu-Matsudaira clan who lived during the late Edo period. She is best known for having participated in the Boshin war; Yukiko joined the Jōshitai (娘子 隊, Girls' Army) during the Battle of Aizu.

== Life ==
Jinbo Yukiko was born in the Inoue clan, powerful retainers of the Aizu clan. Known for her martial skills, beauty and moral character, Yukiko married Jinbo Shuri, son of Jinbo Kuranosuke who was a Karō (top-ranking official samurai). At that time, samurai weddings were only of a political nature, Yukiko's marital relationship with her husband was envied by the people around her.

However, during the Battle of Toba-Fushimi, her husband, Jinbo, advised Tokugawa Yoshinobu to withdraw from the front lines, which infuriated the anti-war faction within the domain. As a result, Jinbo took his own life.

Yukiko, who had returned to her parents' home during the Aizu War of the same year, was ordered by her father, Kazusumi Inoue, to follow the Jinbo family and was prohibited from committing suicide. She left her family (all the women in her parents' household were required to commit suicide).

Subsequently, it was previously believed that Yukiko had joined the women's corps, including Nakano Takeko, and fell in battle. However, according to the testimony of Kikuko Mizushima, when former Aizu domain retainer Kenjiro Yamakawa reexamined the historical accounts, it was confirmed that there was no evidence of her joining the corps, but it was certain that Yukiko died in the same location as Nakano Takeko, at the Teardrop Bridge, although the circumstances of their encounter remain unclear (confirmed through written documents from Jinbo Jinsei, the younger brother of Shuri Jinbo).

On the other hand, according to the testimony of Tosa domain retainer Haya-no-suke Yoshimatsu, as of August 25, Yukiko was detained by soldiers from the Gifu domain, who were once allies, at the Jomyo-ji Temple in Aizubange. Yoshimatsu advocated for her release but was unsuccessful. Yukiko borrowed a short sword from Yoshimatsu and took her own life.

== Popular culture ==
- Byakkotai: NTV year-end drama special in 1986 (actress: Kimiko Ikegami)
- Yae no Sakura: 2013 NHK Taiga Drama (actress: Ashina Hoshi)

== Bibliography ==
- 歴史にも驚くべきスクープがある 『幕末会津の女たち、男たち 山本八重よ銃をとれ』 （中村彰彦 著） （本の話web） - 2016年1月20日閲覧。
