= Ueno Tsuruhime =

Ueno Tsuruhime; 上野 鶴姫
- Born: 1536
- Died: June 4, 1575
- Spouse: Ueno Takatoshi
- Father: Mimura Iechika

Ueno Tsuruhime (上野 鶴姫; 1536 – June 4, 1575) was a Japanese noblewoman and female warrior (onna-musha), who was known as a figure during the Bitchū Conflict. She was the wife of Ueno Takatoshi, the lord of Tsuneyama Castle in Bizen Province.

She was known for her actions during the Bitchū Province Conflict from 1574 to 1575, during an invasion by Mōri-aligned forces. When engaging enemy forces, she was said to have led 33 maidservants in an attempt to oppose the Mori in their invasion of Tsuneyama Castle.

== Early life and marriage ==
Tsuruhime was born in 1536 as the daughter of Mimura Iechika, the lord of Bitchū Matsuyama Castle. It was said that she was trained in martial arts from a young age, learning the sword, naginata, spear, and horseback riding. Tsuruhime had two older brothers and two younger brothers, with her family being prominent in the region.

It is said that Tsuruhime married Ueno Takatoshi at some point, becoming lady of Tsuneyama Castle. Following the assassination of her father by the Ukita clan in 1566, her family was thrust into a conflict known as the Bitchū Heiran. In 1567, Tsuruhime's husband sought revenge against the Ukita clan, leading to a series of battles characterized by shifting allegiances and intense fighting.

As the Mori clan formed an alliance with the Ukita clan against the Oda forces, Tsuruhime and her family found themselves increasingly isolated. By 1575, the situation for the Mimura clan had become dire, with Bitchu Matsuyama Castle falling to the Mori forces on May 22, 1575.

== The fall of Tsuneyama Castle ==
After the fall of Bitchū Matsuyama Castle, Mori forces approached Tsuneyama Castle in preparation for an assault. On June 4, 1575, Tsuneyama Castle was besieged by a force of 6,300 troops, vastly outnumbering the defending forces. At the time of the assault, it is said that Tsuruhime and 33 attendants that were encouraged by her attempted to confront the besieging forces to the death.

When she appeared before them, it is said that Tsuruhime challenged Urano Munekatsu, a commander of the enemy, to a duel, but she was declined, as it is said that the invading forces refused to do battle with the women.

Frustrated, it is said that she returned to the castle with the remaining maids, and they recited nembutsu, before killing themselves, through flinging their bodies forward upon sharp blades.

It is said she was followed by her husband, who then committed seppuku following her death.

== See also ==
- Battle of Nagashino – 1575 Oda-Tokugawa victory over the Takeda clan
- Ōnin War – 15th-century civil war in Japan
- Sekigahara Campaign – Series of battles in Japan in 1600 CE
- Sengoku period – Period of Japanese history from 1467 to 1615

== Bibliography ==
- Turnbull, Stephen (2012). Samurai Women 1184–1877. Bloomsbury Publishing. ISBN 9781846039522.
