= Myōki =

Japanese female warrior

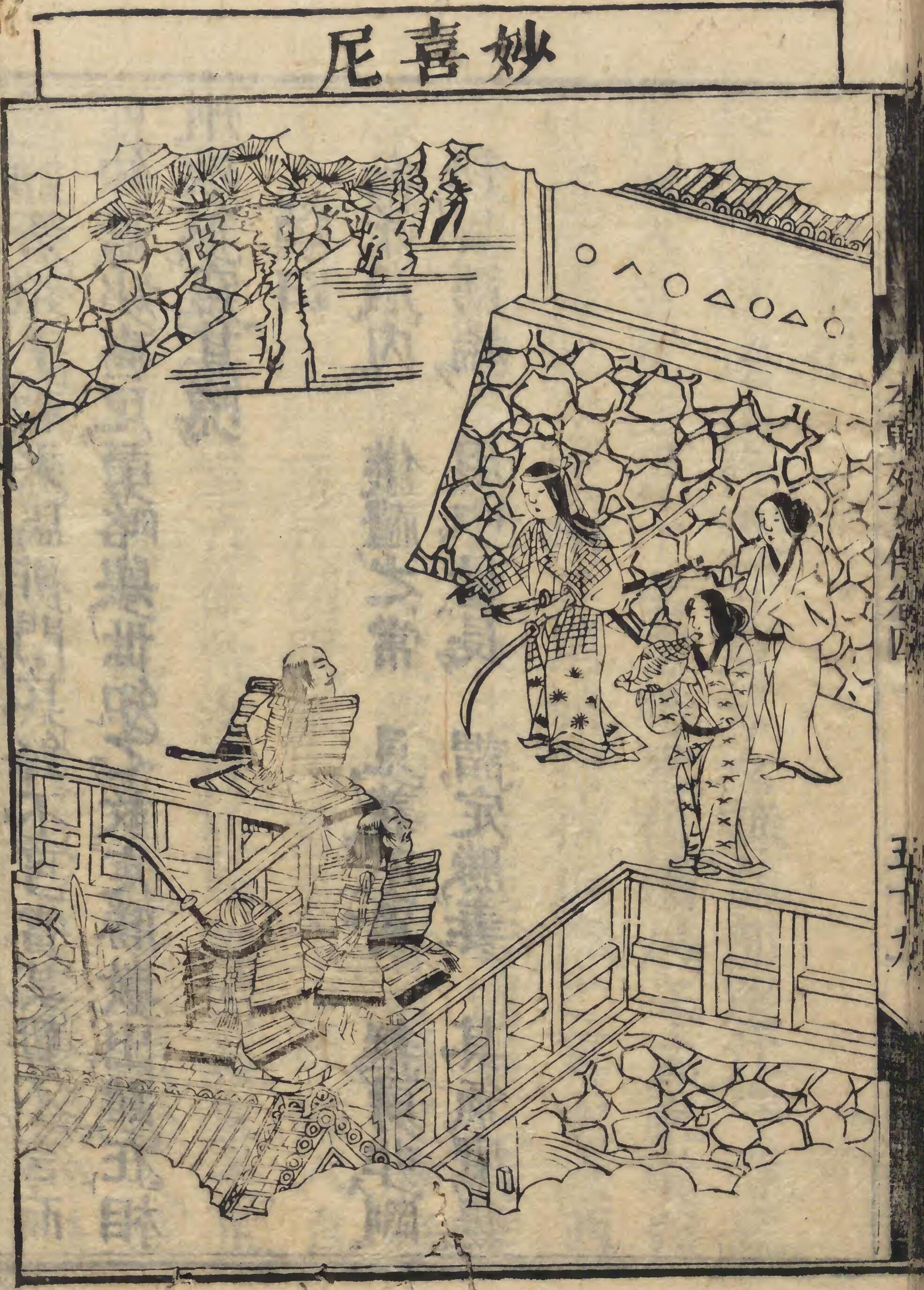
Myokini

Myōki (妙喜) or Myokini (妙喜尼) was a Japanese female warrior (Onna-musha) from the Sengoku period. She was the daughter of Tōyama Naokage and wife of Suwabe Sadakatsu. Myōki was best known for defending Hio castle in Musashi Province against the Takeda clan attack.

== Defense of Hio Castle ==
Myōki's husband was Suwabe Sadakatsu (諏訪部 定勝) the lord of Hio castle and retainer of Later Hōjō clan. In 1568 Takeda Shingen laid siege in Hachigata Castle, which was controlled by Hōjō Ujikuni, but Ujikuni successfully defended. After this, Shingen launched several attacks in the provinces of Suruga, Totomi, Sagami and Musashi against the Hōjō and Imagawa clan.

In December 1569, Yamagata Masakage marched to the Hio castle, an unexpected attack, Myoki went into battle for an unusual reason, her husband was drunk and could not lead the defense. Myoki decided to take the lead, she left the party with her maids carrying sake, summoned the soldiers, armed herself, and went to the castle door. Therefore, it is said that Sadakatsu entrusted the castle to his wife. She commanded troops. and held it until the warlord woke up.

The case of Hio castle being defended by a woman when the castle lord was drunk gained attention from the enemy army. Even after this, Myōki successfully defended the castle and Takeda's troops retreated.
