= Mimura Iechika =

Japanese daimyō

Mimura Iechika (三村 家親) (1517 – February 24, 1566) was a Japanese daimyō of the Sengoku period. The son of Mimura Munechika, he was the lord of Matsuyama Castle, in Bitchū Province. As the influence of the Hosokawa was decreasing in the province, he joined with the Shō family in expanding his local power and influence within Bitchū. He was the father of Ueno Tsuruhime.

However, issues began to arise with the Shō family, and so Iechika turned to Mōri Motonari for support. The Mōri clan came to Iechika's aid, and assisted in largely subduing the province under the Mimura. At the same time, Iechika moved his headquarters from Tsurukubi Castle to Matsuyama Castle, entrusting the former fortification to his senior vassal Mimura Chikanari.

In 1566, while holding a council with his senior retainers at Kōzenji Temple, Iechika was shot to death by Endō Matajirō and Yoshijirō, two brothers who had received orders from Ukita Naoie. It was an uncommon killing, as gun assassinations were still rare at the time.
