= Miyohime =

Japanese samurai woman (1553–1615)

Enkyū Myōgetsu 圓久妙月

Castellan of Kamafunatsu castle
- In office 1584
- Preceded by: Hyakutake Tomonake

Personal details
- Born: 1553
- Died: 1615 (aged 61–62)

Military service
- Allegiance: Ryūzōji clan
- Unit: Hyakutake clan
- Battles/wars: Siege of Saga; Siege of Kumafunatsu

Miyohime (美代姫) or Enkyū Myōgetsu (圓久妙月) was a Japanese Onna-musha from the late-Sengoku period. She was a retainer of Ryūzōji clan. After her husband and Ryūzōji Takanobu were slain in the Battle of Okitanawate, she became the head of 'Kamafunatsu castle' and 'Hyakutake clan'.

== Biography ==
Born in 1553, she was the wife of Hyakutake Tomokane, the castellan of Kamafunatsu castle. Hyakutake (meaning "100 warriors"), who served the Ryūzōji clan, was given his last name because his valour in battle was so great that he was said to have the skill of 100 warriors.

During battles against the Ōtomo clan, Miyohime wielded a naginata and led soldiers into battle herself in order to defend their castle. In 1570, Miyohime assisted Nabeshima Naoshige in defending Saga Castle when it was surrounded by a 60,000-man Ōtomo clan army, and it is said that she commanded standing soldiers at the door.

When Ryūzōji Takanobu attacked the Arima clan in 1582, Shimazu Yoshihisa declared war against the Ryūzōji clan. In the Battle of Okitanawate on May 3, 1584, the Shimazu and Arima army commanded by Shimazu Iehisa marched to Shimabara. The Ryūzōji army was well armed with muskets and intimidated the enemy. Miyohime and her husband were part of the siege defense. When the Shimazu enticed the Ryūzōji into a false retreat, Takanobu led his troops to pursue the Shimazu. Many Shimazu soldiers attacked Takanobu from behind and beheaded him. Tomokane died in the battle. Miyohime heard the death of Takanobu first, and believed it was certain that her husband had also been killed. She became a Buddhist nun and changed her name to Enkyū-ni. However, Naoshige ordered her to defend her husband's castle, so she re-entered Kamafunatsu castle with a small garrison. In September, Tachibana Dōsetsu and Takahashi Jōun rebelled against Ryūzōji clan. Miyohime successfully defended Kamafunatsu castle, clearing the enemy with reinforcements from Nakano Kiyoaki. After the victory, on the grounds that being a nun made her unsuitable to be castellan, she renounced her role of castellan.

After resigning her military career, she probably lived as a Buddhist nun until the last day of her life. Enkyū-ni survived the entire Period of Warring States, dying on August 16, 1615, months after the Siege of Osaka, the final battle that ended the Sengoku period and initiated the Tokugawa shogunate.

== See also ==
- List of female castellans in Japan

== Bibliography ==
- 佐賀新聞社 (2006/12).『五州二島の太守龍造寺隆信』. ISBN 4882981610
