= List of female castellans in Japan =

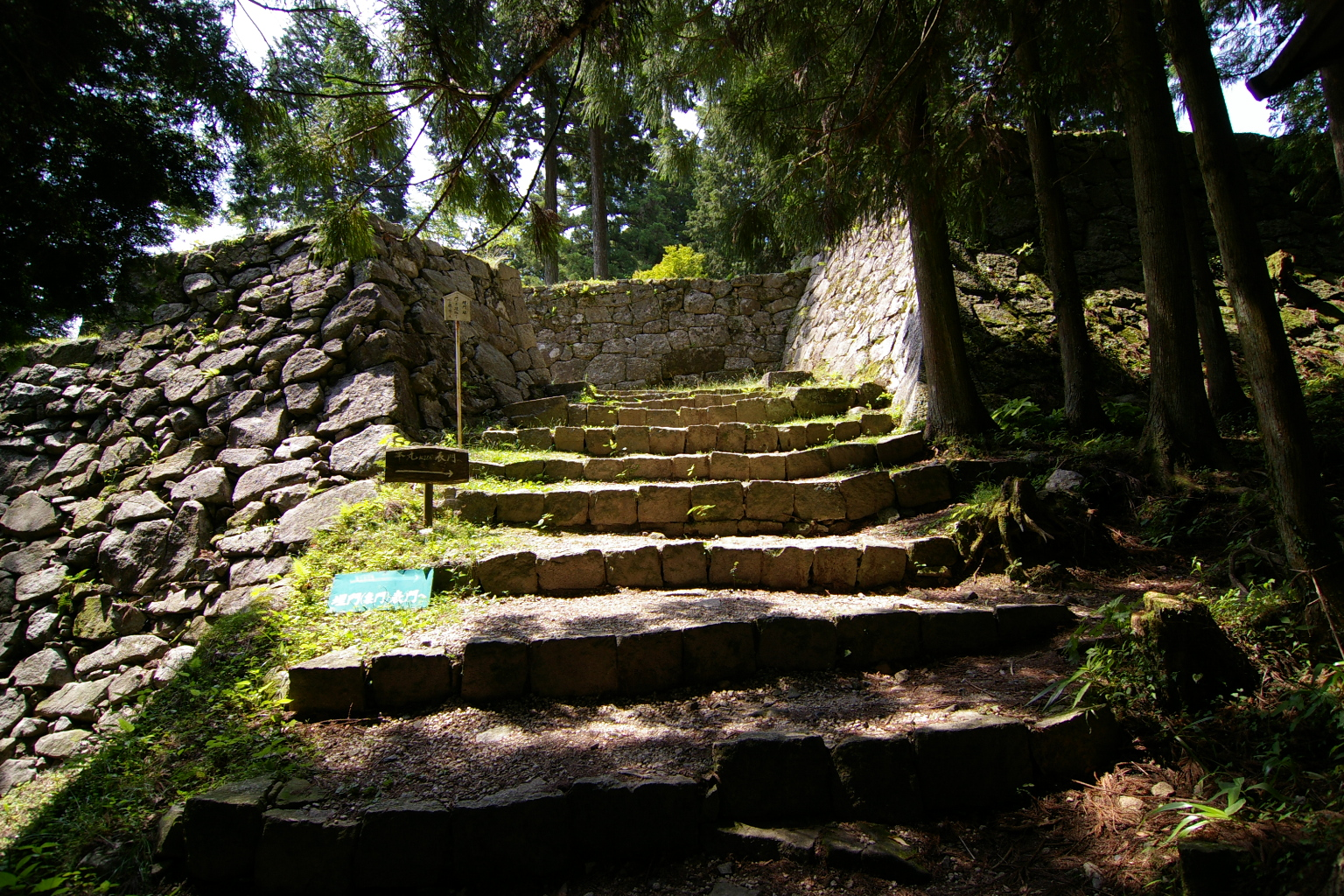
Iwamura Castle, one of Japan's Top 100 Castles is famous as "the castle of the female castellan" owned by Otsuya no kata.

This is a list of female castellans in Japanese history.

== Definition ==
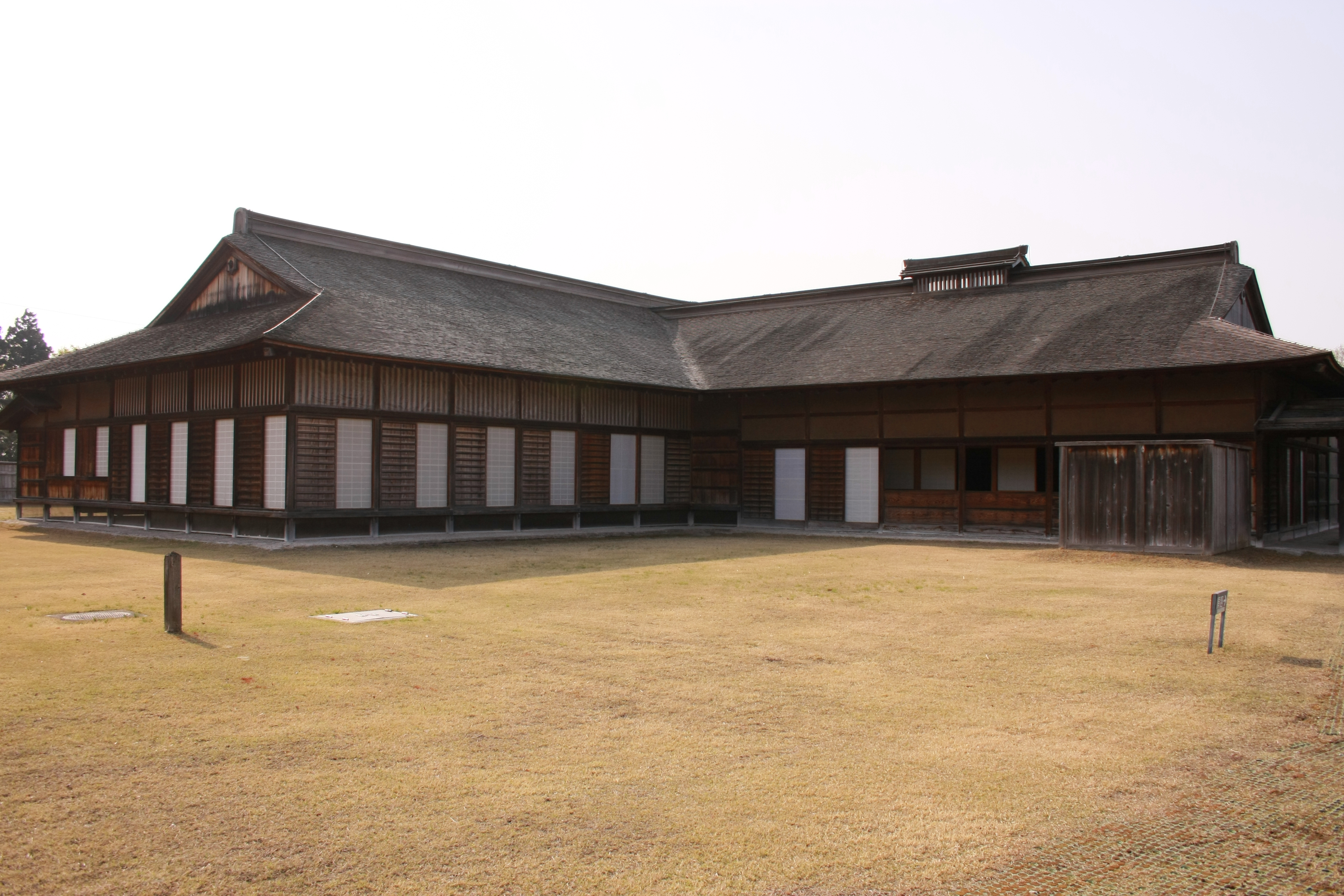
Ne Castle was owned by Seishin-ni from 1614 to 1620.

The list includes the following persons:

- Women who inherited the leadership of a samurai clan.
- A woman who was named commander of the castle by a daimyo.
- Due to the death of a male owner, his wife or daughter formally inherit the leadership of the castle.

The list does not include:

- Women who had great political power but were not formally clan or castle leaders.
- Reigning Empresses or Regents
- Women who was the owner of part or compartment of a castle, like kōdai-in who gave the eastern ward of Osaka Castle to Tokugawa Ieyasu.
- Women who received honorable titles, such as Lady Kasuga who was named '' Jōrō Otoshiyori '' (上 臈 御 年 寄) and commanded the Ōoku area of Edo Castle
- Buildings or areas that cannot be considered a Japanese castle.

== List ==
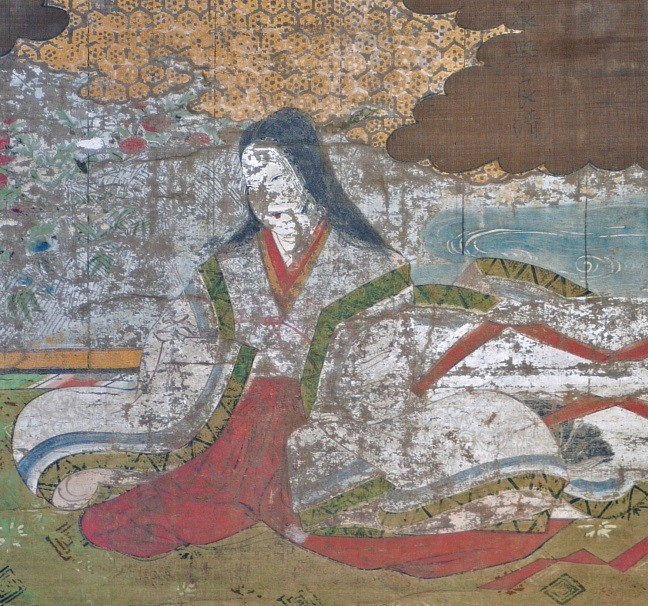
Tachibana Ginchiyo was the castellan of Tachibana Castle.

Name	Allegiance	Castle	Reign
Harima no Tsubone	Ōkura clan	Hondo castle	1233 - Unknown (Kamakura period)
Otazu no kata	None (Note: Equivocal between Matsudaira clan and Takeda clan)	Hikuma Castle (Tōtōmi Province)	1566–1568
Lady Otsuya	Oda clan	Iwamura Castle (Mino province)	1572
Tachibana Ginchiyo	Ōtomo clan	Tachibana Castle (Chikuzen province)	1575–1581
Onamihime	Ashina clan	Sukagawa Castle (Mutsu province)	1582–1588
Ashikaga Ujinohime	（ Later Hōjō clan (Note: She was de facto Koga kubō, title equivalent to shōgun, but in fact puppet of Hōjō clan)	Koga Castle (Shimōsa Province)	1583–1590
Enkyū-ni	Ryūzōji clan	Kamafunatsu Castle (Chikugo Province)	1584
Yodo-dono	Toyotomi clan	Yodo castle (Yamashiro Province)	1589
Ashikaga Ujinohime(2)	Toyotomi clan→ Kitsuregawa clan	Kōnosu Palace (Shimōsa Province)	1590–1620
Kōdai-in	Toyotomi clan→ Tokugawa clan	Kyōto New castle (Yamashiro Province)	1599–1623
Seishin-ni	Nanbu clan	Ne Castle (Mutsu province) (Note: The fortifications at Ne Castle were destroyed at that time)	1614–1620

== Other evidence of female castellans ==
A sequence of women who acted remarkably as castellans, without being a formal heiress, or female castellans where there is little detail about their administration, area and castle.

=== Sengoku period (1467–1603) ===
- Akamatsu Tōshōin: She was a de facto Daimyo of the Akamatsu clan. She was a guardian of Akamatsu Yoshimura. After Yoshimura's death, Tōshōin took total control of the clan as the leader in 1521.
- Akai Teruko: After she participated in Siege of Odawara, Toyotomi Hideyoshi gave her as a reward the territory of 5435 koku in Ushiku, but soon she transferred the property to Her son.
- Jukei-ni: She acted as guardian and adviser to Ujiteru, Yoshimoto and her grandson Imagawa Ujizane. She has spent four generations of daimyos and it is said that she was de facto the last Sengoku daimyo of the Imagawa clan.
- Ikeda Sen: ''Tōdaiki'' (当代記) describes that she owned lands with a revenue equivalent to 10,000 koku, like a minor daimyo.
- Myorin: Luís Fróis describes that a woman was the ruler of an area that is currently Ōita city, that woman was probably Myorin. Her son inherited the clan leadership after the death of Yoshioka Akioki. Because he was very young, Myorin became the representative head of Tsurusaki castle as a counselor for her son. Cases like these were common in all of Japanese history.
- Shimazu Kameju: She was granted by Shimazu Yoshihiro landholdings of 5,000 koku in the Hioki District of Satsuma, by Shimazu Yoshihisa additional landholdings of 2,739 koku in the village of Ōnejime in Ōsumi Province. In 1611, she received Kokubu Castle after her divorce. In 1624, she received another grant of 10,000 koku free of levies for her generation.
- Yodo-dono: She formally received Yodo Castle in 1589. After Hideyoshi's death, she acted as guardian of his heir Toyotomi Hideyori. Following the fall of the Council of Five Elders that resulted in the Battle of Sekigahara, Yodo-dono becomes the chief representative of the Toyotomi clan and Osaka Castle.
- Lady Nata: In Otomo Family Document (大友家文書録), it is described that she owned lands on the Kunisaki Peninsula, an area run by her family, the Nata clan.
- Fujishiro Gozen: She was the female castellan of a minor castle, the Fujishiro-kan (藤代館) in Mutsu Province.

== See also ==
- Onna-musha
- Kunoichi
- Empress of Japan
