= Sasaki Rui =

Japanese swordswoman, Onna-musha and kenjutsu expert

- The Sasaki family crest
- Born: Koga
- Style: Ittō-ryū, Sekiguchi-ryū
- Spouse: Kosugi Konoshikono

Sasaki Rui (佐々木 累) was a Japanese swordwoman, onna-musha, and kenjutsu expert of the early Edo period (mid-17th century). She was known as the "Strangely Dressed Female Sword Master".

== Life ==
Sasaki was born in Koga Domain, located in Shimōsa Province (modern day Koga, Ibaraki); her exact birthdate is unknown. Her father Sasaki Uōto was a member of a clan of kenjutsu masters in service to Doi Toshikatsu and was thoroughly versed in the martial arts. Since Rui had no brothers, and her attempts to take a husband ended in divorce, upon her father's death from illness the Sasaki clan name became extinct.

Rui went to Edo, where she rented a house in present-day Asakusa and began teaching the martial arts. At the same time that her teaching was becoming well-known, she began to be famous for her unusual dress: she would leave the house wearing a black silk crepe haori (a man's garment at the time) emblazoned with the Sasaki family crest, her hair done up in an indoor style with hairpins, and wearing the samurai's long and short swords. At that time, the ruffians known as kabukimono or hatamoto yakko were running rampant in Edo, and Rui began fighting with the "Shiroe" gang, among other groups.

In the period (1650-1659) in which Ishigaya Sadakiyo was serving as commissioner for the northern district of Edo, Rui was summoned by Ishigaya, who asked her whether her behavior was unworthy of her status as the daughter of a samurai family, and whether her remaining unmarried, her strange dress, and her quarrels with the hatamoto yakko were unbecoming; his goal was that she should preserve her father's legacy as a samurai in the service of Doi by taking a samurai husband. This incident also made its way to the ears of Kano Motokatsu, the commissioner for southern Edo, and on account of her bravery, Doi Takahatsu himself took an interest in finding her a husband. (Given that he had died in 1644, it may be that the name of the northern commissioner was recorded incorrectly.) Rui took the second son of Doi retainer Kosugi Sanesoimon, Kosugi Konoshikono, as her husband, and revived the Sasaki clan.

Her age at death and the date of her death are also unknown.

== In popular media ==
In 1969, Shōtarō Ikenami's short story "Myōonki" featured a female swordfighter, "Sasaki Rui", as the protagonist. His 1972 novel Kenkaku Shōbai featured female martial arts master "Sasaki Saitō" in disguise as a man.
