= Nakano Takeko =

Japanese female warrior

- 中野 竹子
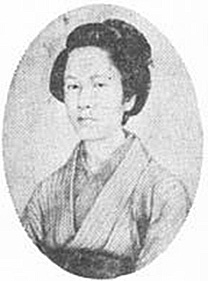
- Born: April 1847; Edo, Japan
- Died: October 16, 1868 (aged 21); Aizu, Japan
- Burial place: Head: Hōkai-ji, Aizubange, Fukushima, Japan
- Relatives: Nakano Heinai (father); Nakano Kōko (mother); Akaoka Daisuke (adoptive father)
- Military career
- Allegiance: Aizu Domain
- Branch: Jōshitai
- Service years: 1868
- Conflicts: Battle of Aizu

Nakano Takeko (中野 竹子; April 1847 – 16 October 1868) was a Japanese female warrior of the Aizu Domain, who fought and died during the Boshin War. During the Battle of Aizu, she fought with a naginata (a Japanese polearm) and was the leader of an ad hoc corps of female combatants who fought in the battle independently.

Takeko and other women stepped forward on the front line without permission, as the senior Aizu retainers did not allow them to fight as an official part of the domain's army. This unit was later retroactively called the Jōshitai (娘子隊, Girls' Army).

== History ==
=== Early years ===
Born in Edo, Nakano Takeko was the firstborn daughter of Nakano Heinai (1810–1878), an official of Aizu, and of Nakano Kōko (1825–1872), daughter of Oinuma Kinai, samurai in the service of Toda of the Ashikaga domain. She had a younger brother and sister. Their residence was in Beidai Ninocho, in the quarters of Tamogami Hyogo, a distant relative of her father. She was well-educated and came from a powerful samurai family.

From 1853 to 1863, she received training in martial arts, in the literary arts on Chinese Confucian classics and in calligraphy. She was adopted by her own teacher, Akaoka Daisuke, who was also the famous instructor of Matsudaira Teru, adoptive younger sister of Matsudaira Katamori, daimyō of Aizu. She taught students younger than her, such as her sister, who also attended school.

Nakano's certification (menkyo) was in Hasso-Shoken, a branch of the major Itto-ryu tradition. With this she found employment at the Itakura estate, lord of Niwase, a secondary domain in today's Okayama prefecture. She taught naginata to the lord's wife and served as her secretary. She left this position in 1863, when she was adopted by her master, who had been transferred to Osaka for a job of the Aizu domain and had forces deployed in Kyoto for security duties. He tried to get her to marry his nephew, but since the nation was shaken by social unrest, she refused and reunited with her Edo family.

After working with the adoptive father as instructor of martial arts during the 1860s, Nakano was in the region of Aizu for the first time in February 1868. During those spring and summer months, she taught naginata to women and children in Aizuwakamatsu castle, as well as capturing the voyeurs of the women's bathroom.

=== The civil war ===
Nakano participated in the Boshin War, the civil conflict between the supporters of the Tokugawa shogunate and those fighting for the restoration of the Meiji emperor.

During the conflict, Nakano Takeko took part in the Battle of Aizu, using her naginata at the head of an ad hoc body of female warriors, which included her mother and sister.

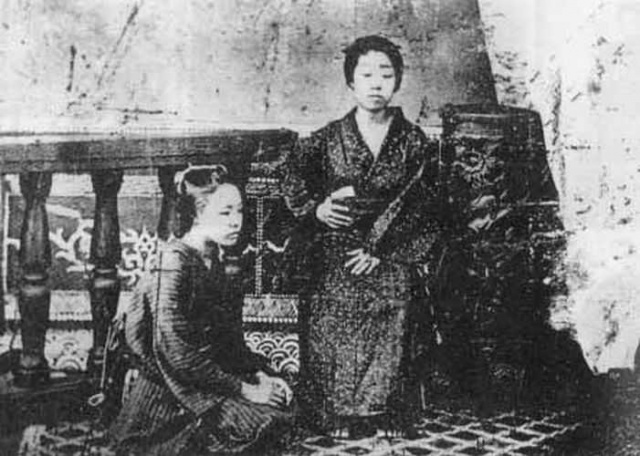
Hirata Kochō and another Onna-musha.

The Jōshitai (娘子隊, Girls' Army) was formed by these women:

- The leader of the group, Nakano Takeko. She was 21 years old at this time.
- Takeko's mother and sister, Kōko and Yūko. At this time Kōko was in her 40s and Yūko was 16 years old.
- Hirata Kochō and younger sister Hirata Yoshi.
- Yoda Kikuko and the mother or older sister Yoda Mariko.
- The famous female warrior, Yamamoto Yaeko.
- Okamura Sakiko and older sister Okamura Makiko.
- An unnamed woman who was Watashi's concubine.
- Jinbo Yukiko, a female retainer of the Aizu clan.
- The students of Monna naginata dojo: Monna Rieko, Saigo Tomiko and Nagai Sadako.
- The younger sister of Hara Gorō.
- Kawahara Asako
- Koike Chikyoku (1824－1878), a nanga painter who survived the battle.

They fought independently, as the ancient officials of Aizu, in particular Kayano Gonbei, did not allow them to officially fight. This unit was later retroactively given the name of a female army (娘子 隊 Jōshitai^{?}). Furuya Sakuzaemon, a Shogunate Army colonel commanding elements of the 11th and 12th Infantry Regiments, designated Nakano as the leader of the unit of women the day before her death.

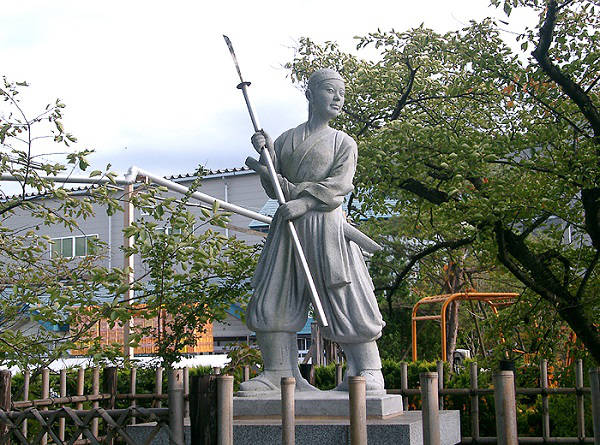
Nakano Takeko Statue at Hōkai-ji, Aizubange, Fukushima, Japan

=== Death ===
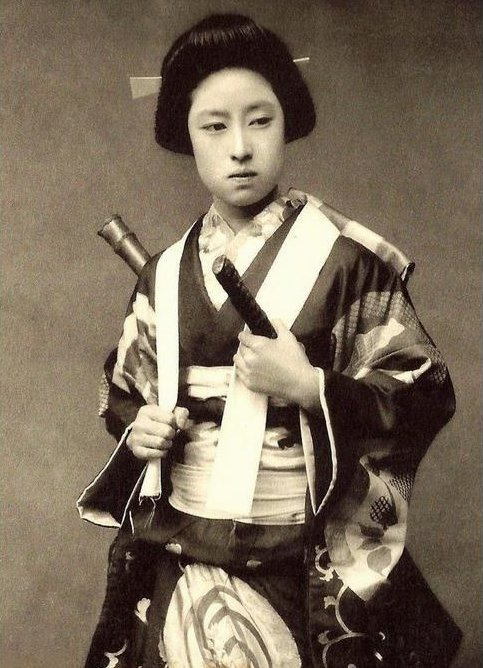
Photo of unknown onna-musha (most likely an actress) who was often mistakenly identified as Nakano Takeko

On the morning of 16 October 1868 at the Yanagi bridge, Nishibata area in Fukushima, Nakano launched a charge against Imperial troops from Domain of Ōgaki, commanded by a man named Shaguma, who were armed with rifles. When the Imperial troops realised that their enemies were female warriors, their commanders gave orders not to shoot them. This gave Nakano's warriors an opportunity to attack. They killed several of their enemies before the Imperial troops opened fire. Nakano was wounded by a bullet to the chest.

Rather than letting the enemy take possession of her head as a trophy, Nakano asked her sister Yūko to behead her in order to prevent her capture, as well as give her an honourable burial. Yūko agreed to her sister's request. She asked for the assistance of Ueno Yoshisaburō, an Aizu soldier, to help with the beheading.

Hirata Kochō was saved by Jinbo Yukiko in the battle and, being the vice-commander, assumed command of the troop to defend Aizuwakamatsu Castle after she was killed, while the deputy became Yamamoto Yaeko. Later, Kōko and Yūko entered Tsuruga castle and joined Yamamoto Yae.

After the battle, Nakano's head was taken by her sister to the nearby Hōkai temple of her family, modern Aizubange, in the prefecture of Fukushima, and buried with honour by the priest under a pine tree. Her weapon was donated to the temple.

== Monument ==
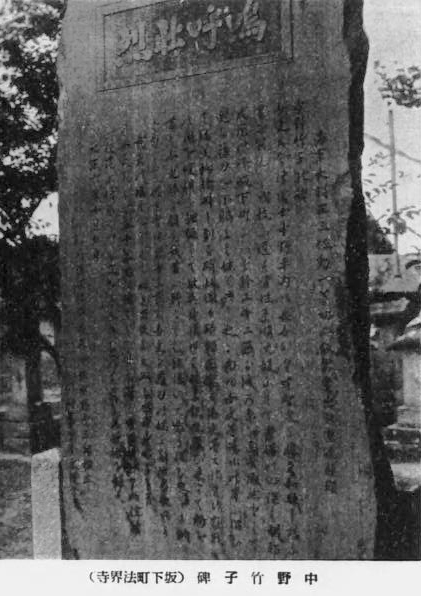
Nakano Takeko Monument at Hōkai-ji, Aizubange, Fukushima, Japan

A monument to her was erected beside her grave at Hōkai Temple. Aizu native and Imperial Japanese Navy admiral Dewa Shigetō was involved in its construction.

== Legacy ==
During the annual Aizu Autumn Festival, a group of young girls wearing hakama and white headbands take part in the procession, commemorating the actions of Nakano and her band of women fighters of the Joshigun.
