= Lady Ichikawa =

Japanese warrior (died 1585)

Lady Ichikawa (市川局 Ichikawa no Tsubone, d. April 5, 1585) was a Japanese female warrior (Onna-musha) from the Sengoku period who helped drive out Ouchi and the Otomo clan from Chugoku. She was the wife of Ichikawa Tsuneyoshi, a samurai warlord and retainer of Mōri Motonari. She defended Konomine castle from the attack by Ōuchi.

== Siege of Konomine castle ==
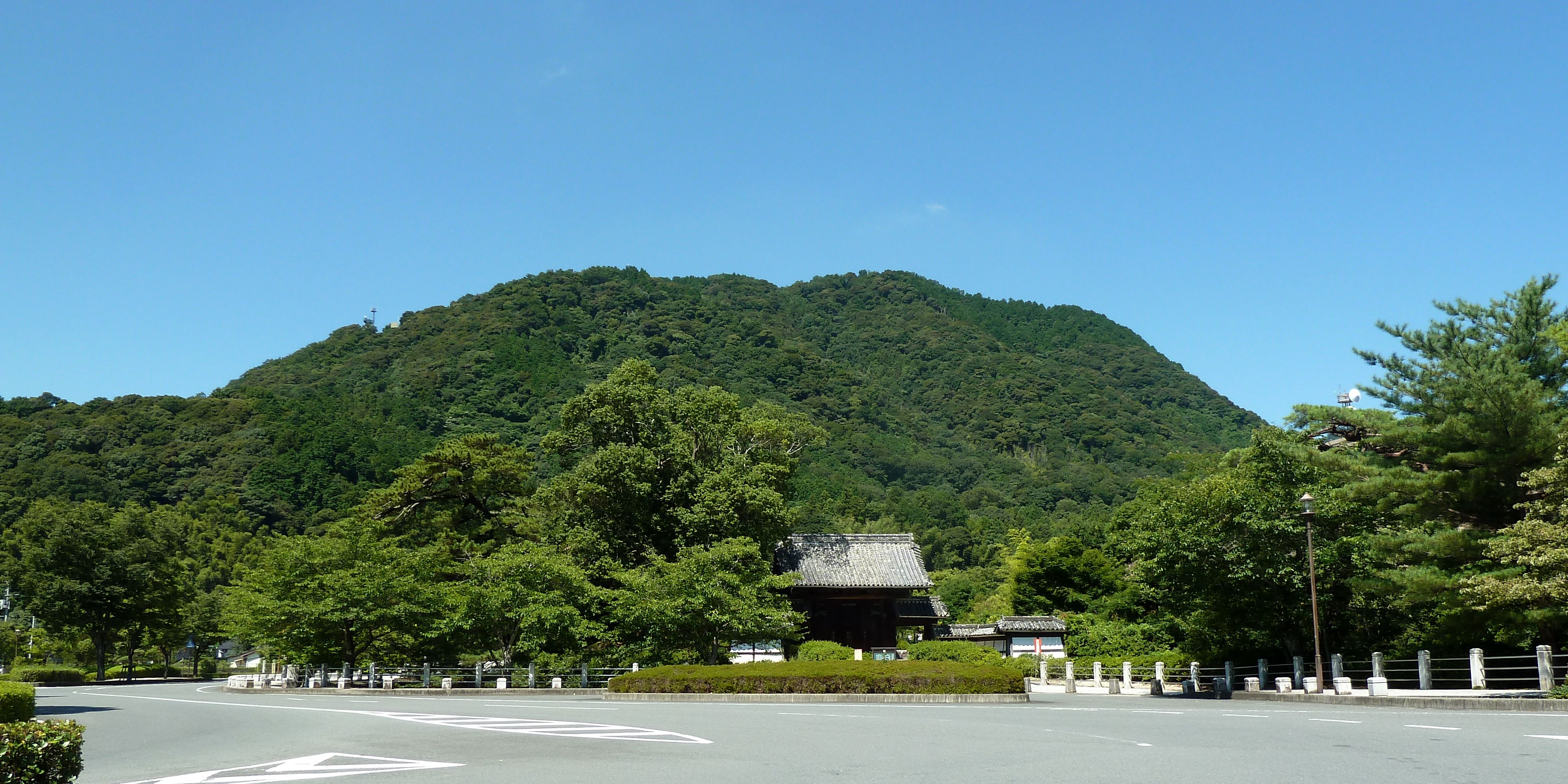
Remains of Konomine castle

Ōuchi Teruhiro sided with Ōtomo Sōrin, a daimyo Christian in Bungo Province, after Mori Motonari's troops assassinated Sue Harukata at the Battle of Itsukushima. In 1569, Ōuchi Teruhiro led an attack on the Konomine castle. At this time Ichikawa Tsuneyoshi was fighting against the Otomo clan, in order to capture Tachibana Castle in Kyushu. When Ōuchi Teruhiro invaded the Ichikawa clan area, Lady Ichikawa remained as leader and prepared to defend the Konomine castle.

Lady Ichikawa's ladies-in-waiting prepared to fight, and armed themselves with swords. She led her women - and the few remaining castle soldiers - in defending the castle, including making a sortie out past the walls in a full frontal attack against Ouchi Teruhiro's army. In the fierce 10-day battle the castle's defense remained strong and Teruhiro fled. Teruhiro was defeated in front of the Mori army that had left of Kyushu and killed himself. Due to this achievement, Lady Ichikawa received a letter of appreciation from Mōri Terumoto on July 6, 1577.

== See also ==
- Onna-musha
