= Tomoe Gozen =

Female samurai

Gozen / Lady Tomoe Gozen
- 巴 御前
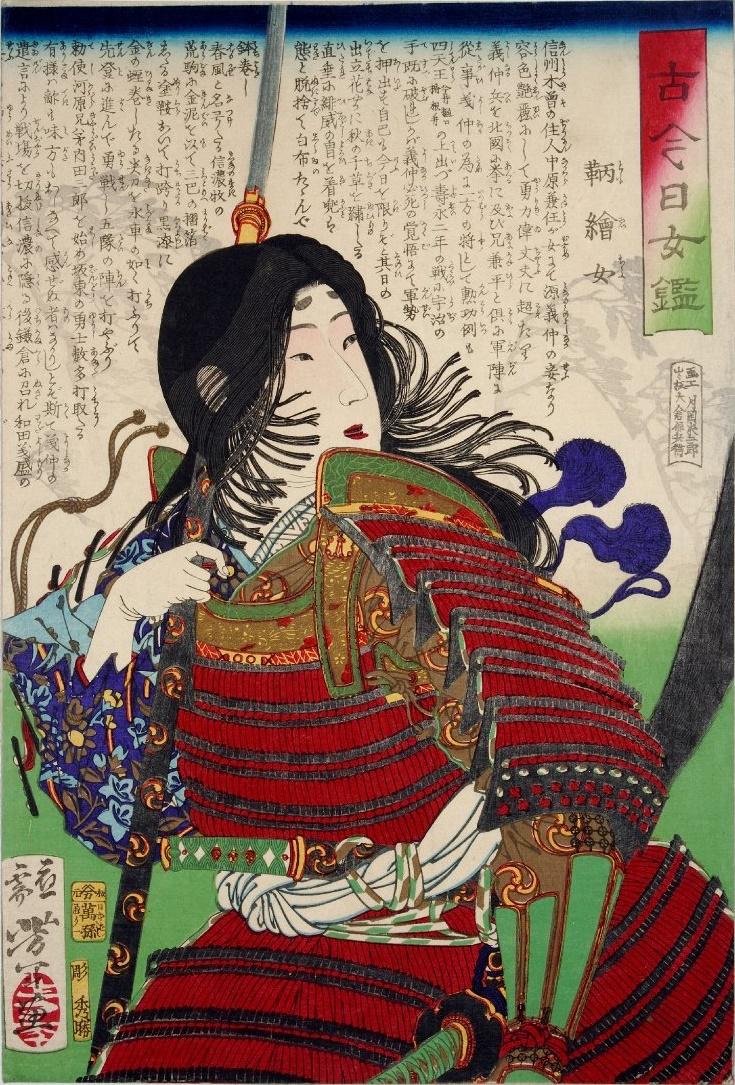
- Tomoe Gozen, by Tsukioka Yoshitoshi
- Leader: Minamoto no Yoshinaka (commander)

Personal details
- Born: 1157
- Died: 1247 (aged 89–90)
- Occupation: Buddhist Nun (After the Battle of Awazu)

Military service
- Allegiance: The Minamoto clan (Specifically Minamoto no Yoshinaka)
- Years of service: 1182-1184
- Battles/wars: Battle of Awazu
- Military role/occupation: Onna-musha (Before the Battle of Awazu)

Tomoe Gozen (巴 御前, Japanese pronunciation: [tomo.e]) was an onna-musha, a female samurai, mentioned in The Tale of the Heike. There is doubt as to whether she existed as she does not appear in any primary accounts of the Genpei War. She supposedly served under the samurai lord Minamoto no Yoshinaka during the Battle of Awazu, part of the Genpei War in the late Heian period, which led to the establishment of the Kamakura shogunate.

== Genpei War ==
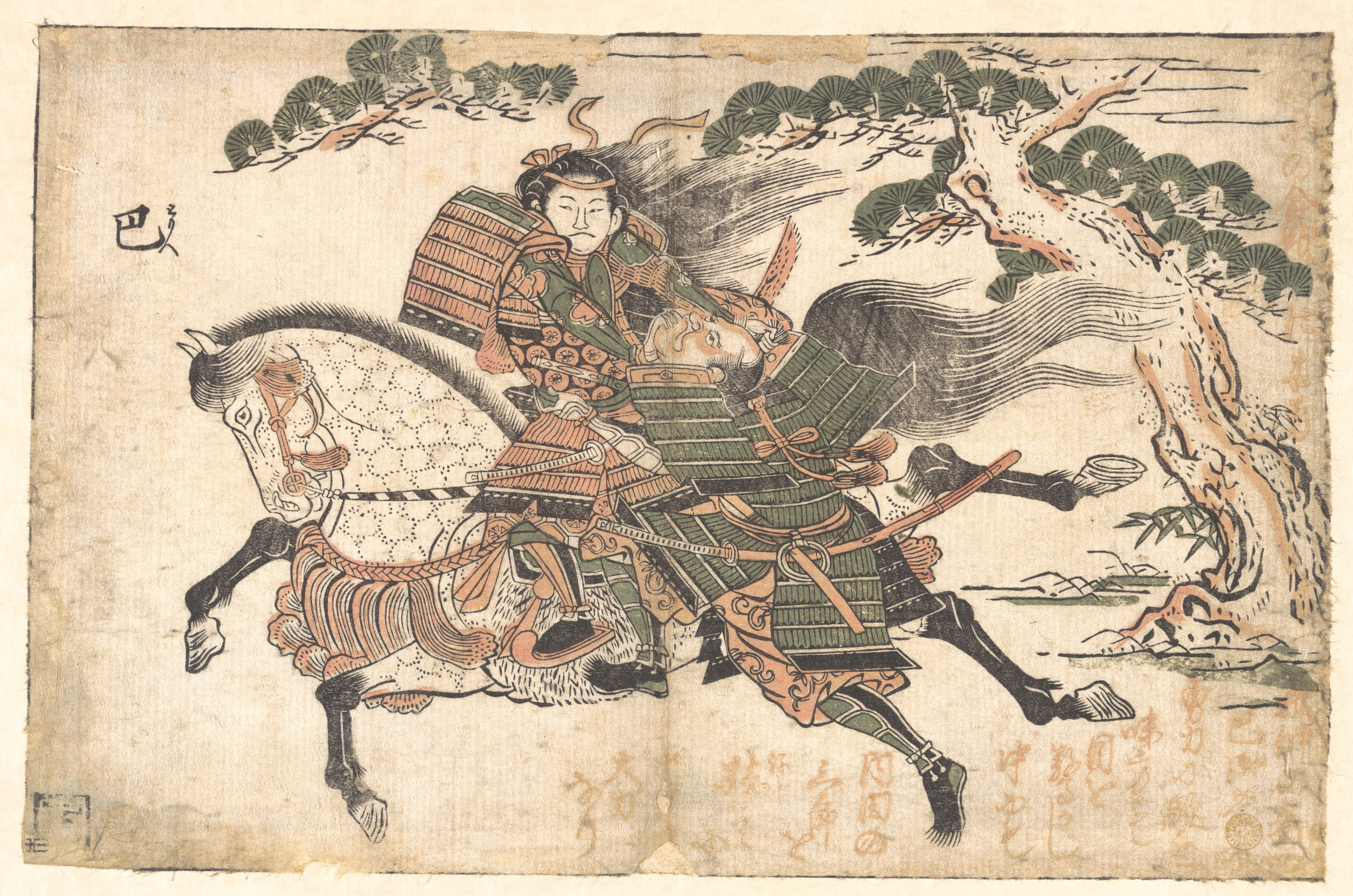
"Tomoe Gozen Killing Uchida Ieyoshi at Battle of Awazu no Hara (1184)", print by Ishikawa Toyonobu, c. 1750.

Under the leadership of Yoshinaka she commanded 300 samurai against 2,000 warriors of the rival Taira clan during the war. After defeating the Taira in 1182 and driving them into the western provinces, Yoshinaka took Kyoto and desired to be the leader of the Minamoto clan. His cousin Yoritomo was prompted to crush Yoshinaka, and sent his brothers Yoshitsune and Noriyori to kill him.

Yoshinaka fought Yoritomo's forces at the Battle of Awazu on February 21, 1184, where Tomoe is known for beheading Honda no Morishige, leader of the Musashi Clan. She presented his head to her master Yoshinaka. Although Yoshinaka's troops fought bravely, they were outnumbered and overwhelmed. When Yoshinaka was defeated there, with only a few of his soldiers standing, he told Tomoe Gozen to flee because he wanted to die with his foster brother.

There are varied accounts of what followed. She is also known for having killed Uchida Ieyoshi and for escaping capture by Hatakeyama Shigetada. She then retired to become a Buddhist nun, remaining so supposedly until 1247 AD.
