= Fujishiro Gozen =

Japanese Samurai woman

Fujishiro Gozen 藤代御前

Personal details
- Born: 16th-century
- Died: Date unknown Fujishiro castle, Mutsu province
- Children: at least one son

Fujishiro Gozen (藤代御前) was an Onna-musha from the late-Sengoku period. She lived in Mutsu province. When her husband died in battle against Tsugaru clan, she was young and had only one son. She became a female lord and defended her small castle called Fujishiro-kan (藤代館) to raise her son.

According to "Fujishiro Village History", the governess of this palace, Fujishiro Gozen, was a rare hero who took up her weapons, attacked with her family and died at the end of the bloody battle. For her courageous actions, she received the name ''Gozen'', a Japanese term that means "young lady" and generally applied to women of the warrior class.

== Siege of Fujishiro Castle ==
The daimyō of Hirosaki Domain, Tsugaru Tamenobu, desired to make her one of his concubines thanks to her beauty, but she refused, since Tamenobu had killed her husband. However, Tamenobu refused to give up and sent in soldiers to try to take her by force, but she took up weapons together with her servants and fought back.

Fujishiro had already gone to war several times with Tamenobu, apparently she acted as ruler of an independent clan in the area belonging to the Tsugaru clan. When Tamenobu's troops marched to the door of Fujishiro Castle, she left armed with her sister and servants, locked the castle with her family inside and went to fight Tamenobu. Due to Tsugaru's large number of troops, Fujishiro eventually died in battle. When she was approaching her death, she looked angrily at Tamenobu and died saying: "This grudge, we curse Tamenobu's descendants to the end". After her death, Tamenobu was so scared of this curse that it is believed he chose to build his own grave on top of hers.

== See also ==
- List of female castellans in Japan
