= Battle of Awazu =

Final stand of Minamoto no Yoshinaka

- Part of the Genpei War
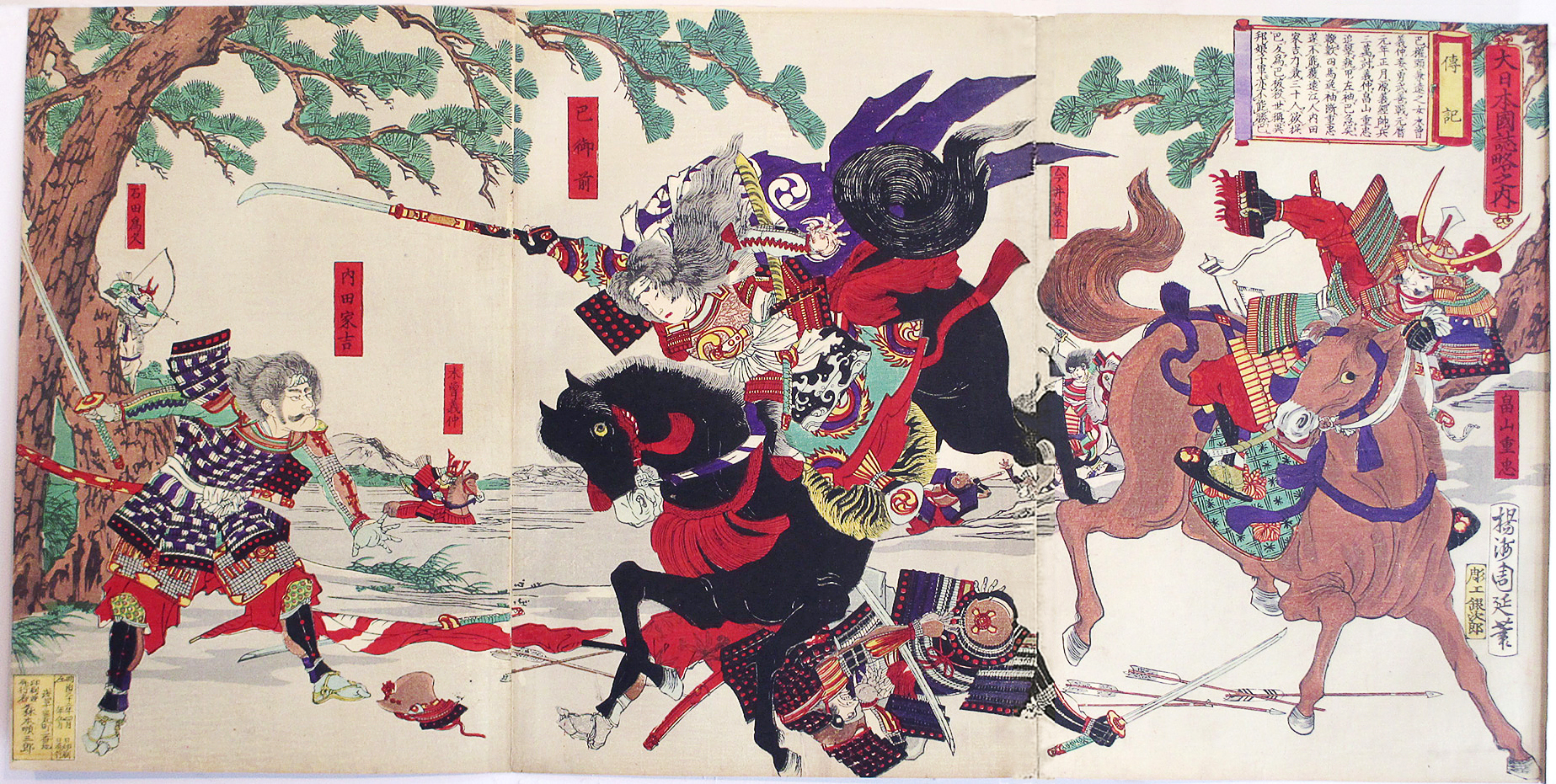
- Tomoe Gozen defeats Uchida Ieyoshi and Hatakeyama Shigetada.
| Date | February 21, 1184 |
| Location | Awazu, Ōmi Province |
| Result | Minamoto no Yoshitsune et al. victory; Minamoto no Yoshinaka killed |

Belligerents
| Minamoto clan loyalists | Minamoto clan rebels |

Commanders and leaders
| Minamoto no Yoshitsune; Minamoto no Noriyori | Minamoto no Yoshinaka †; Imai Kanehira † |

Minamoto no Yoshinaka made his final stand at Awazu, after fleeing from his cousins' armies, which confronted him after he attacked Kyoto, burning the Hōjūjiden, and kidnapping Emperor Go-Shirakawa. During the pursuit, he was joined by his foster brother Imai Kanehira and Tomoe Gozen.

During the battle, they fought valiantly, holding off Noriyori's large force of thousands of men for a time. However, in the end, they both died in battle.

Yoshinaka was struck dead by a stray arrow when his horse became mired in a paddy field. Kanehira committed suicide by leaping off his horse while holding his sword in his mouth.

== Gallery ==
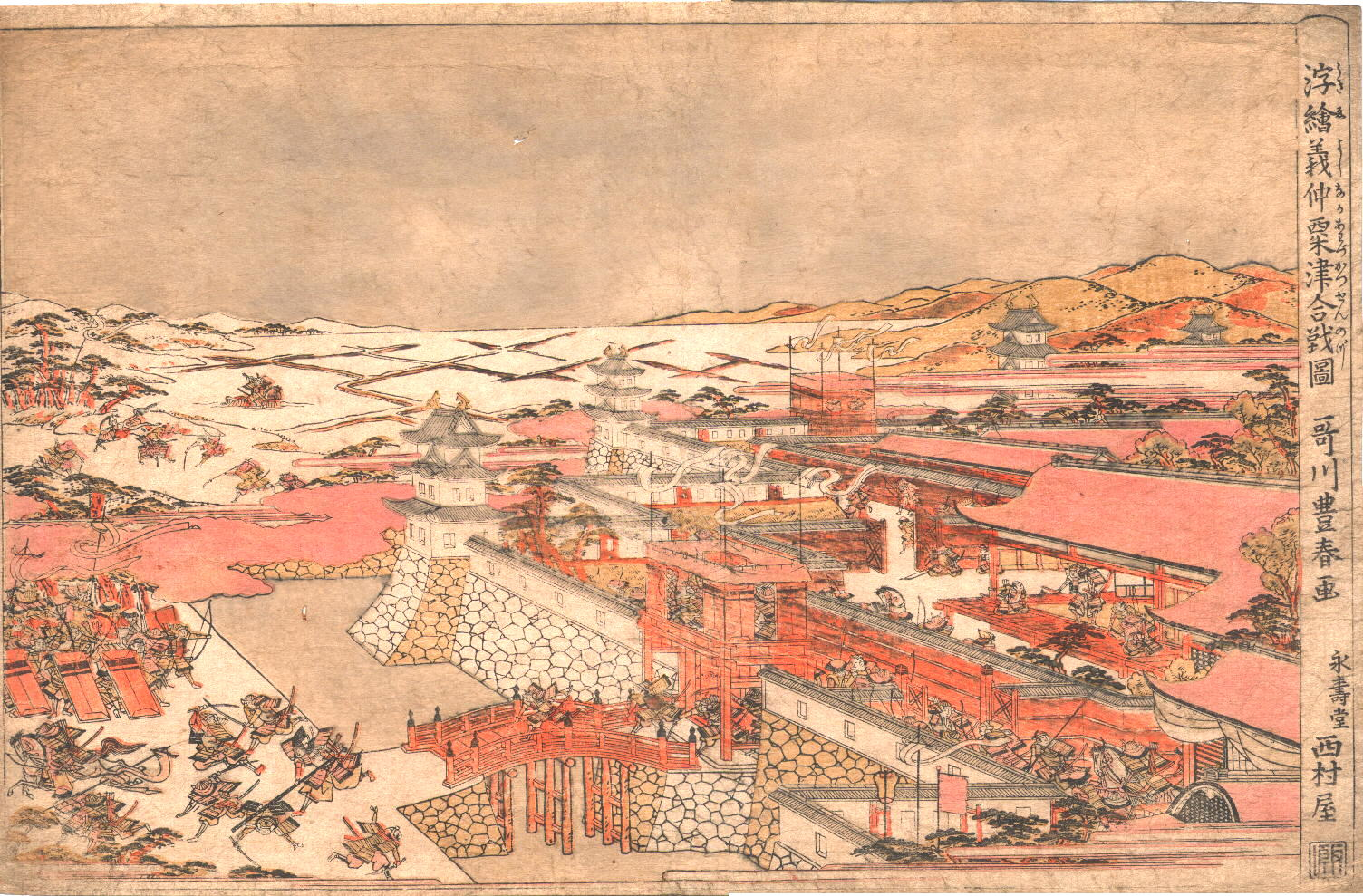
Woodblock print of the battle of Awazu, by Utagawa Toyoharu, ca. 1760s. Yoshinaka and Kanehira's deaths are depicted in the left middle distance.

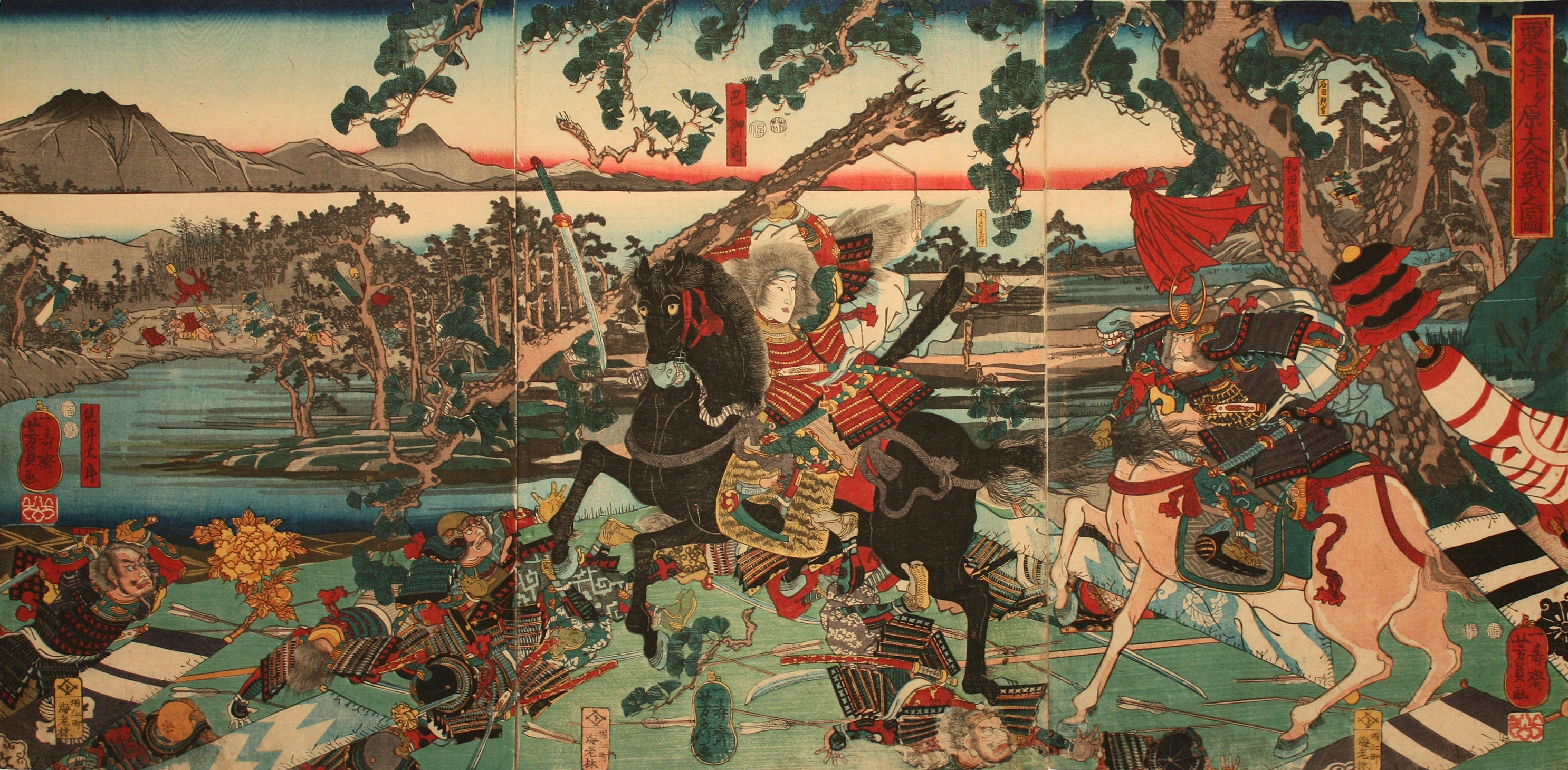
Tomoe Gozen in the Battle of Awazu—by Utagawa Yoshikazu.
