= Onna-musha =

Female warrior in pre-Meiji Era Japan

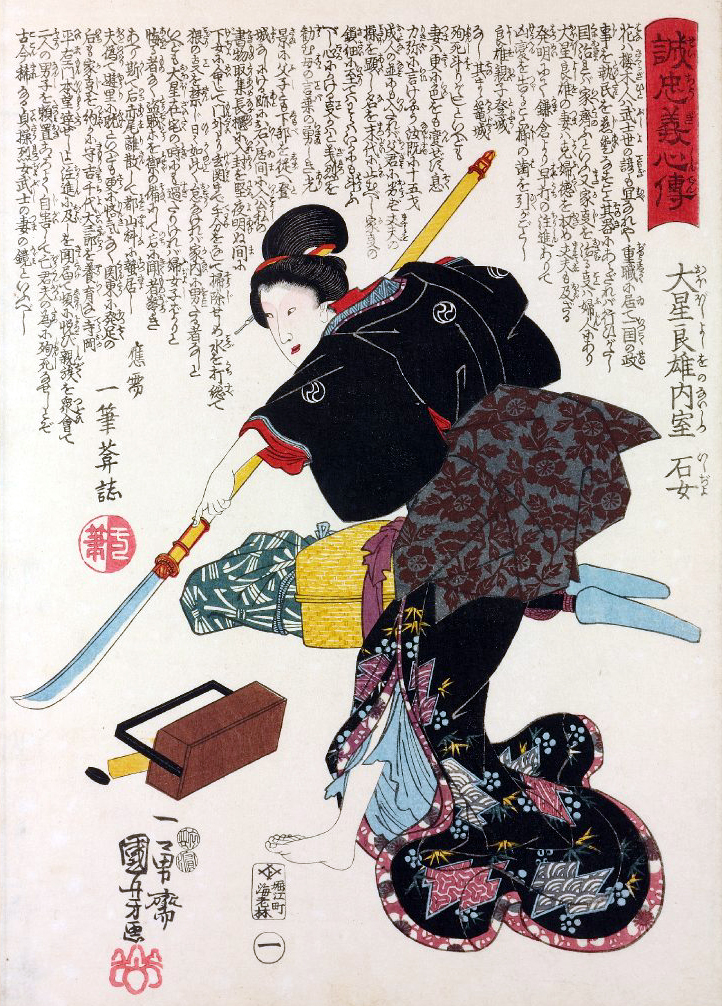
Ishi-jo wielding a naginata, woodblock print by Utagawa Kuniyoshi, 1848

Onna-musha (女武者) is a term referring to female warriors in pre-modern Japan, who were members of the bushi (warrior) class. They were trained in the use of weapons to protect their household, family, and honor in times of war; some of them fought in battle as any samurai man would. Many samurai wives followed the bushido teachings and would fight alongside their husbands, or on their own, to physically defend their households. Onna-musha also have an important presence in Japanese literature, with Tomoe Gozen and Hangaku Gozen being famous and influential examples.References to female warriors are limited because their deeds were not as commonly documented, and as a result their existence is often overlooked.

== Kamakura period ==
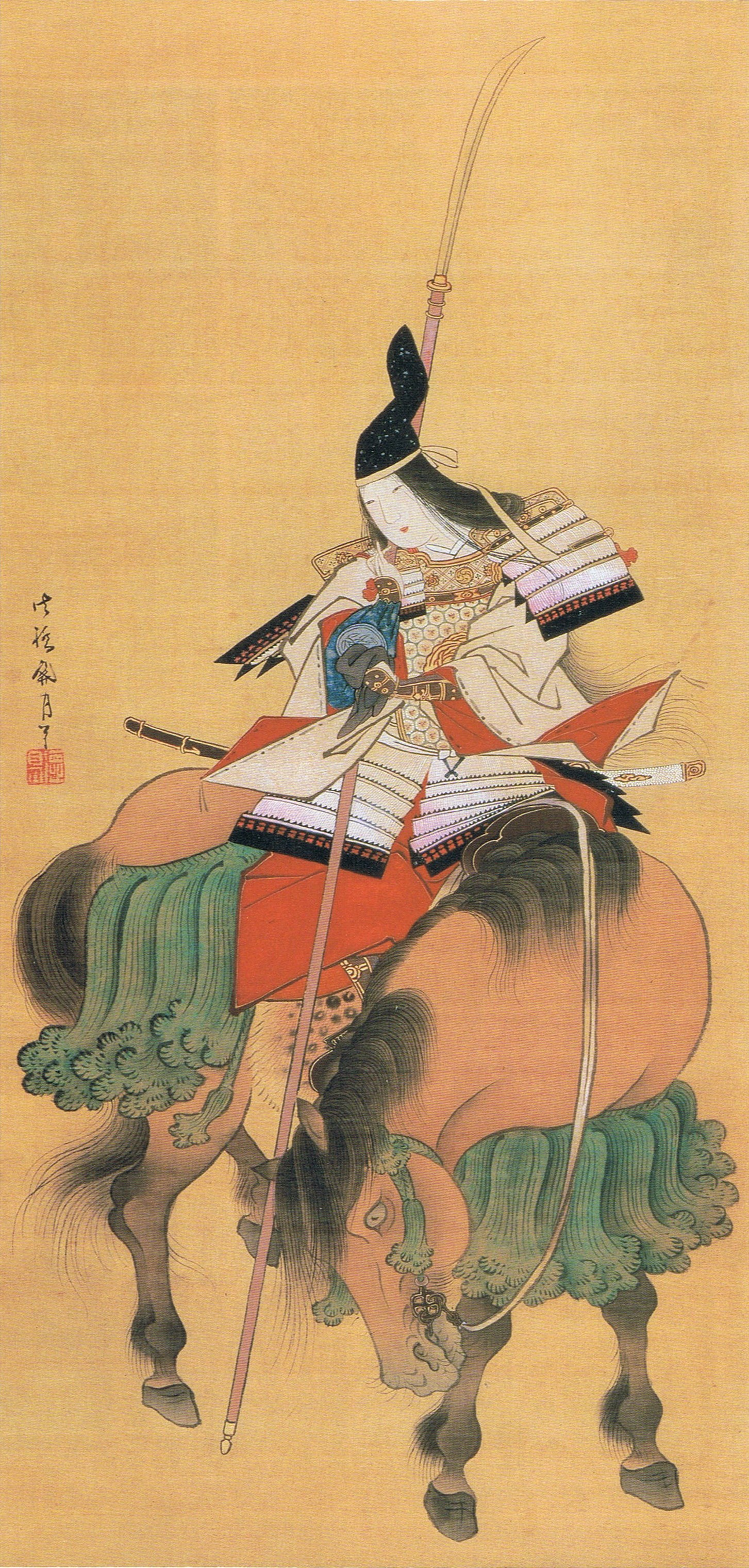
Tomoe Gozen

The Genpei War (1180–1185) was a war between the Taira (Heike) and Minamoto (Genji) clans, two very prominent Japanese clans of the late-Heian period. The epic The Tale of the Heike was composed in the early 13th century in order to commemorate the stories of courageous and devoted samurai. Among those was Tomoe Gozen, supposedly the servant of Minamoto no Yoshinaka of the Minamoto clan. However, she is sometimes referred to as his concubine and his wife. She assisted Yoshinaka in defending himself against the forces of his cousin, Minamoto no Yoritomo, especially during the Battle of Awazu in 1184.

In The Tale of the Heike, she was described as:

... especially beautiful, with white skin, long hair, and charming features. She was also a remarkably strong archer, and as a swordswoman, she was a warrior worth a thousand, ready to confront a demon or a god, mounted or on foot. She handled unbroken horses with superb skill; she rode unscathed down perilous descents. Whenever a battle was imminent, Yoshinaka sent her out as his first captain, equipped with strong armor, an oversized sword, and a mighty bow; and she performed more deeds of valor than any of his other warriors.

Tomoe Gozen was not always accredited as a historical figure. However, she has impacted much of the warrior class, including many traditional Naginata schools. Her actions in battle received much attention in the arts, such as the Noh play Tomoe and various Ukiyo-e. Tomoe Gozen has inspired video game characters and many pieces of art displayed in Japanese museums, including a sculpture at the entrence of the Yoshinaka Museum. She is also honored yearly in the procession at Jidai Matsuri (Festival of the Ages), featured in the Heian women's portion.

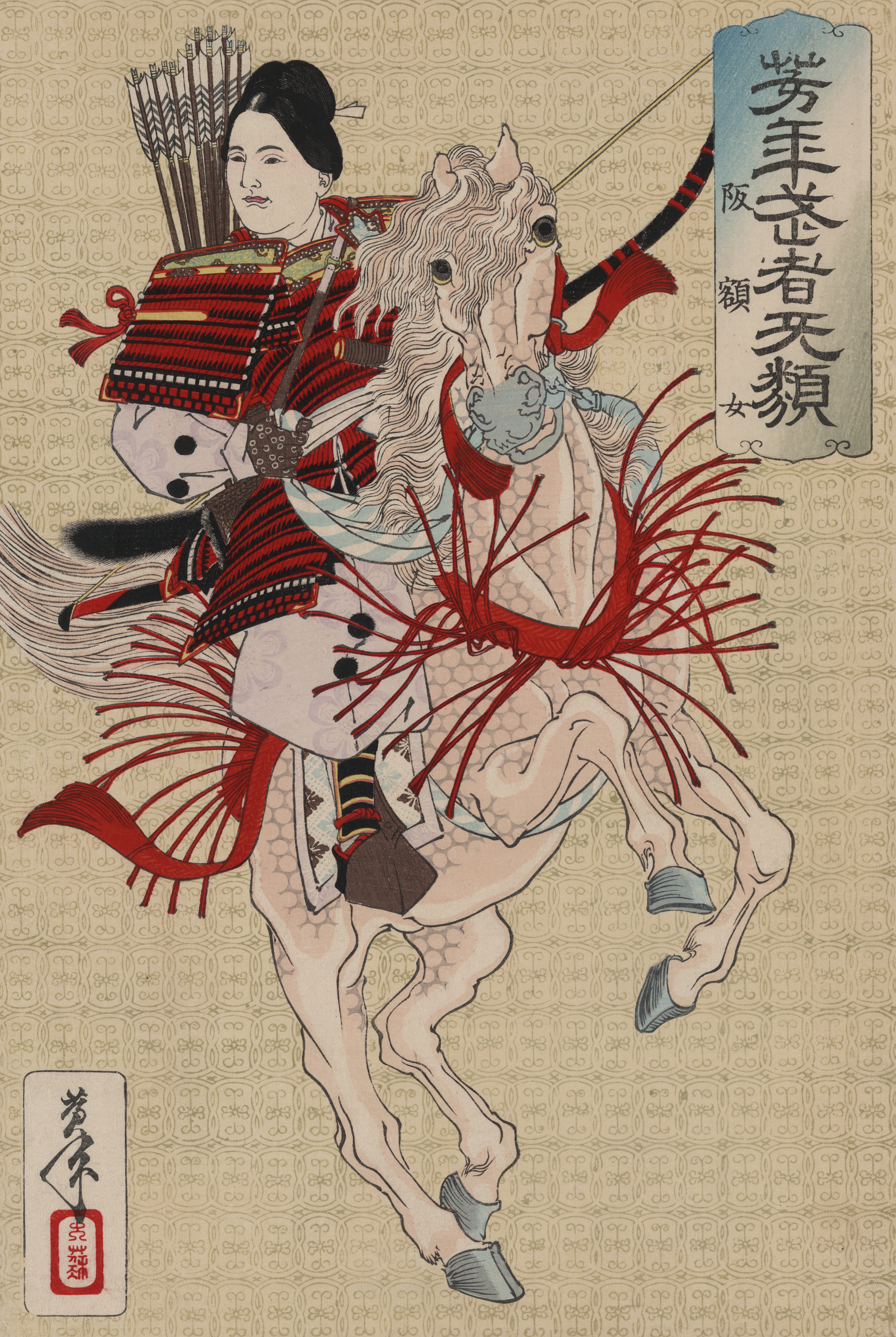
Hangaku Gozen

Another famous female warrior of the Genpei War was Hangaku Gozen. While Tomoe Gozen was an ally of the Minamoto clan, Hangaku allied with the Taira clan. Hangaku Gozen was known for her archery skills, picking off enemies from atop defensive towers. At request of Shogun Minamoto no Yoriie, she was captured, taken to Kamakura, and permitted an enemy samurai to marry her. While they tried to erase her identity as a warrior, she is still remembered as one of the most prominent female warriors in the Kamakura period.

Another refernce to female warriors in the Kamakura period comes from Chancellor Tōin Kinkata (1291–1360). He writes in his journal Entairyaku (園太暦) of a "predominately female cavalry", but without further explanation. With limited details, he concludes: "there is a lot of female cavalries." As he noted that they were from western Japan, it is possible that women from the western regions far from the big capital cities were more likely to fight in battles. Accounts of Onna-musha tend to spotlight only a few women, like Tomoe Gozen and Hangaku Gozen. Yet many other stories show they were not alone.

== Sengoku period ==
During the Ashikaga Shogunate, due to tensions between the shogunate retainers, Japan went to war again. In 1460, when shōgun Ashikaga Yoshimasa abdicated his position to his younger brother Ashikaga Yoshimi, Hino Tomiko (Yoshimasa's wife) was strongly against this decision. Tomiko sought political and military support to rule as regent until the birth of her son, securing the support of Yamana Sōzen and other leaders of powerful samurai clans. Then she went to war against Yoshimasa and his supporters, especially the Hosokawa clan. This dispute for succession started the Ōnin War (1467–1477) and led to the beginning of the Sengoku period.

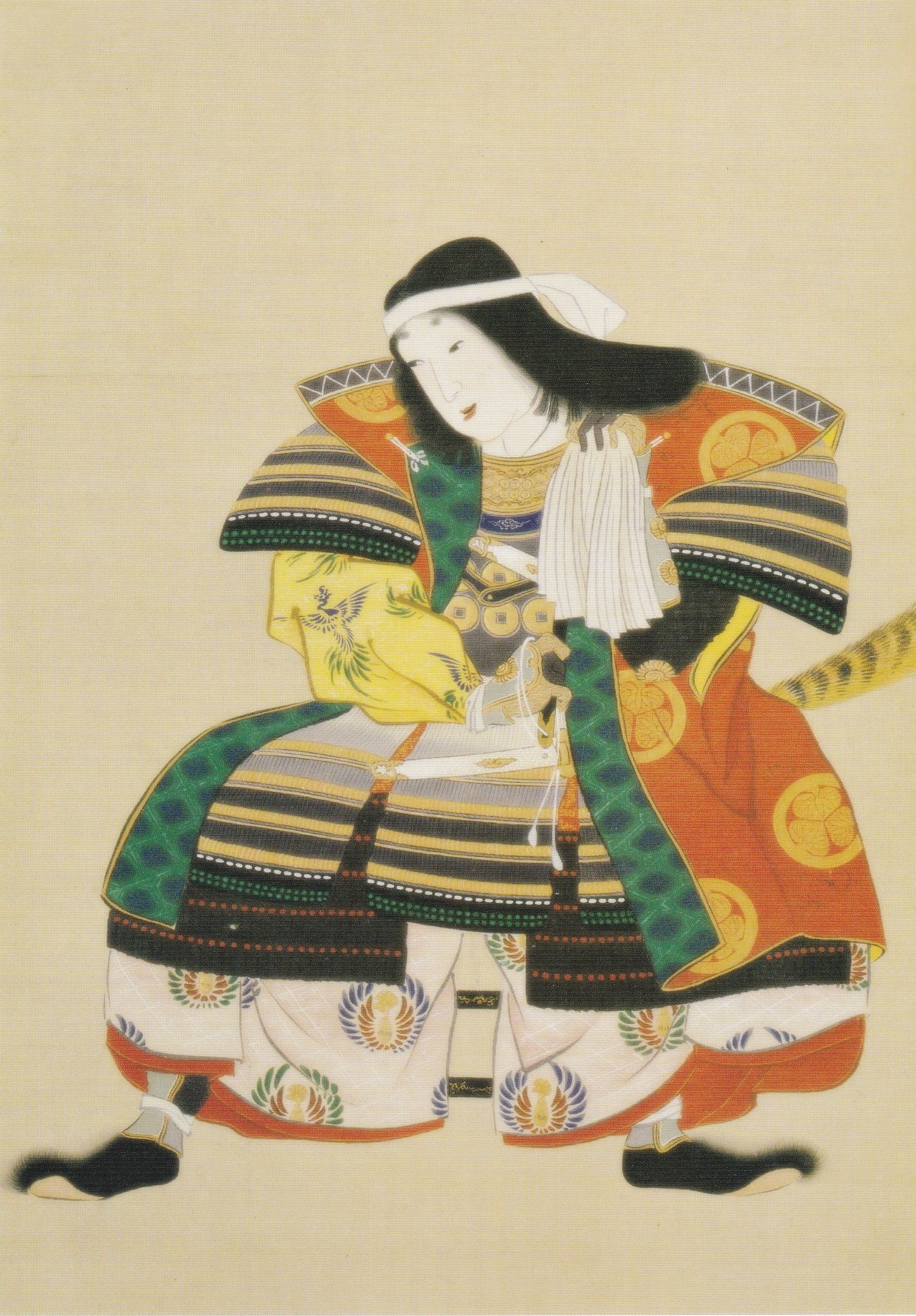
Komatsuhime was believed to have fought in the siege of Ueda and challenged Sanada Masayuki at the entrance of Numata Castle.

In the Azuchi–Momoyama period, when several daimyō took charge of their own affairs and fought against each other by territory, women of noble clans and even peasant women members of Ikkō-ikki, Ikkō-shu, Saika Ikki and others Ikki sects went to the battlefields. In 1569, when a Mori family retainer from western Japan went absent from a campaign, his wife Ichikawa no Tsubone assumed responsibility for the defense of Kōnomine Castle with her armed ladies-in-waiting.

=== Evidence of women participating in battles ===
During the Sengoku period there are several accounts of women fighting actively on the battlefield, such as the cases of Myōrin, who inspired the people to fight against 3,000 Shimazu soldiers, Kaihime, who fought against the Toyotomi clan in the siege of Oshi (1590), Onamihime, who became the representative leader of the Nikaidō clan and fought in various battles against her nephew Date Masamune, and Akai Teruko, who became famous for fighting until she was 76 years old and became known as "The Strongest Woman in the Warring States Period". The actions of Ōhōri Tsuruhime earned her the title of "Joan of Arc of Japan", and established her as one of the most recognizable female warriors in Japanese history.

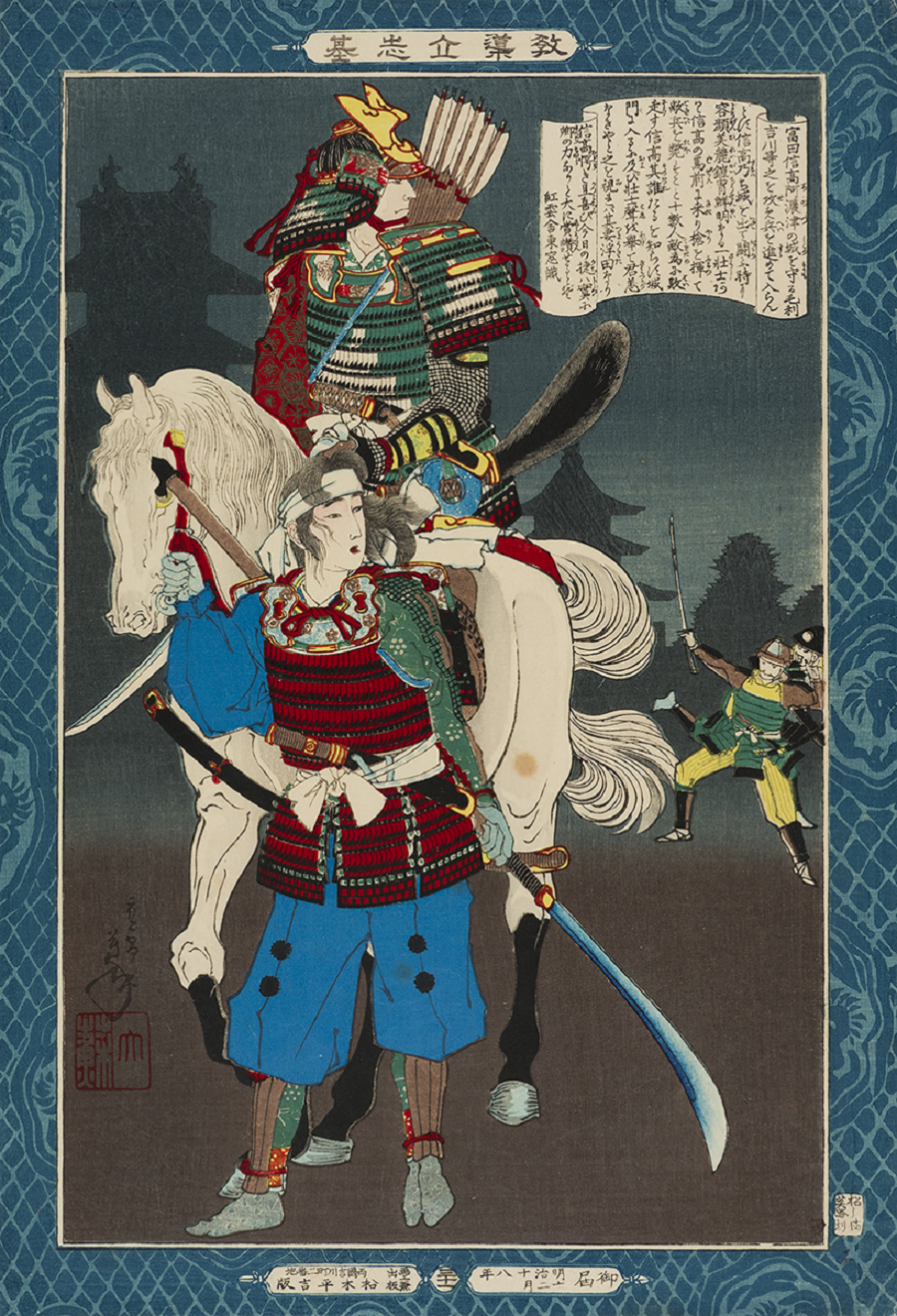
Yuki no Kata defending Tsu Castle during the Sekigahara campaign

In the 16th century, there were combat units consisting only of women, as was the case of Ikeda Sen, who led 200 women musketeers (Teppo unit) in the Battle of Shizugatake and Battle of Komaki-Nagakute. Otazu no kata fought alongside 18 armed maids against Tokugawa Ieyasu's troops. Ueno Tsuruhime led thirty-four women in a suicidal charge against the Mōri army. Tachibana Ginchiyo, leader of the Tachibana clan, fought with her female troops in the Kyushu Campaign (1586), and in the siege of Yanagawa (1600) she organized a resistance formed by nuns against the advance of the Eastern Army.

In 1580, a woman from the Bessho clan joined a rebellion against Toyotomi Hideyoshi during the siege of Miki. Her husband Bessho Yoshichika was one of the leaders of the rebellion, and she played a key role during the siege, allying herself with the Mori clan. The rebellion lasted three years, until Bessho Nagaharu surrendered the castle to Hideyoshi. Lady Bessho committed suicide shortly after. In 1582, Oda Nobunaga launched a final attack on the Takeda clan in a series of battles known as the Battle of Tenmokuzan. Oda Nobutada (son of Nobunaga) led 50,000 soldiers against 3,000 Takeda allies during the siege of Takato castle. During this battle, it is recorded in the compilation of chronicles from the Oda clan, Shinchō Kōki, that a woman from the Suwa clan defied Nobutada's forces.

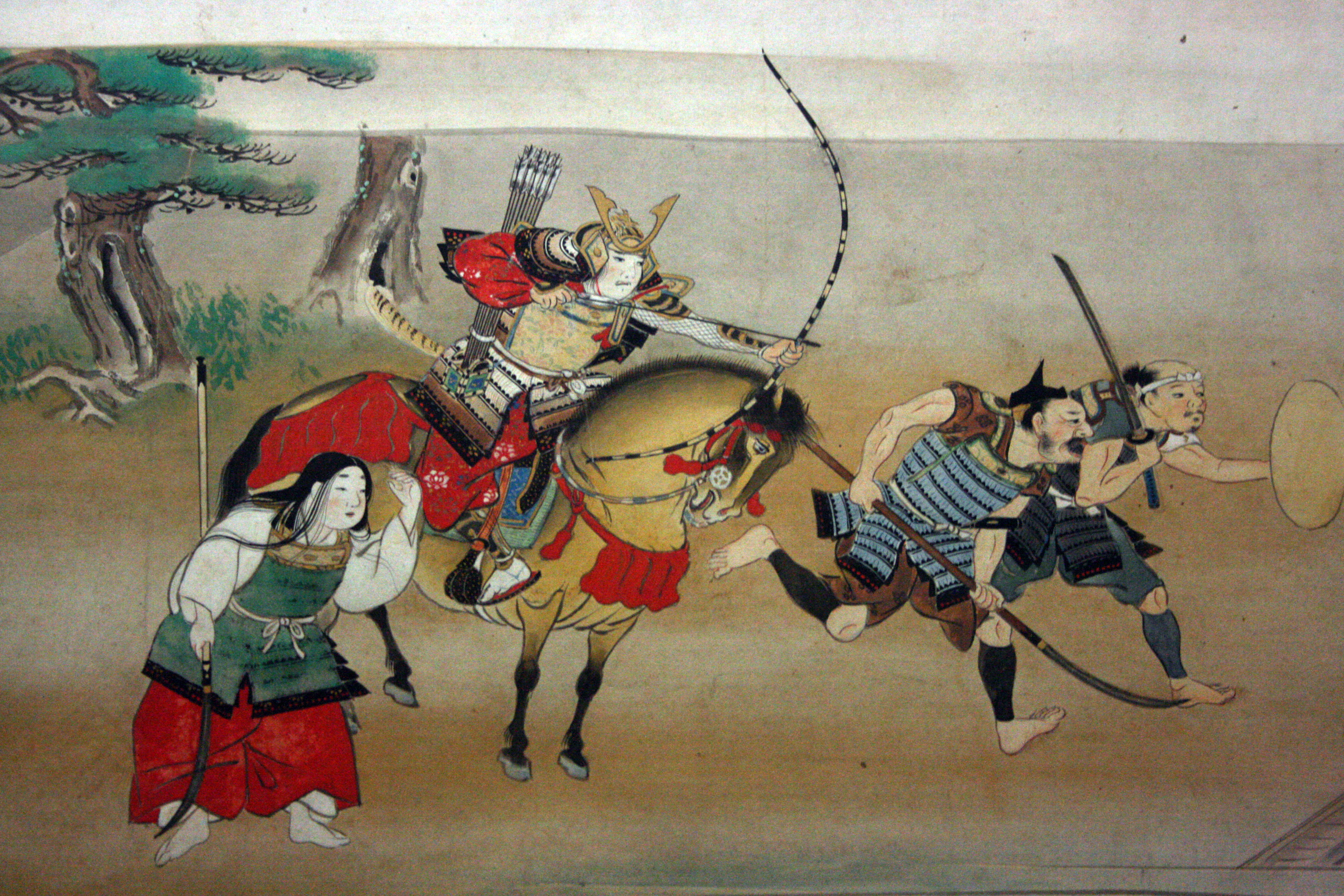
Women and men in the Night Attack on Yoshitsune's Residence At Horikawa, 16th century (Japan)

It is believed that many more women participated in battles than have been documented in historical records. A study of 105 bodies excavated from the Battle of Senbon Matsubaru between Takeda Katsuyori and Hojo Ujinao in 1580 indicated that 35 of them were women. Other excavations were made in areas where battles took place away from castles. Japanese archeologist Suzuki Hiroatsu explains that although it is common to find bones of women or children where castle sieges took place, since they usually participated in the defense, the absence of a castle at the Senbon Matsubaru site led him to conclude that "these women came here to fight and to die", and could have been part of the army. Excavations conducted on other battle sites across Japan gave similar results. According to Turnbull, the details of the excavation confirm the onna-musha were certainly present on the battlefield.

== Edo period and beyond ==
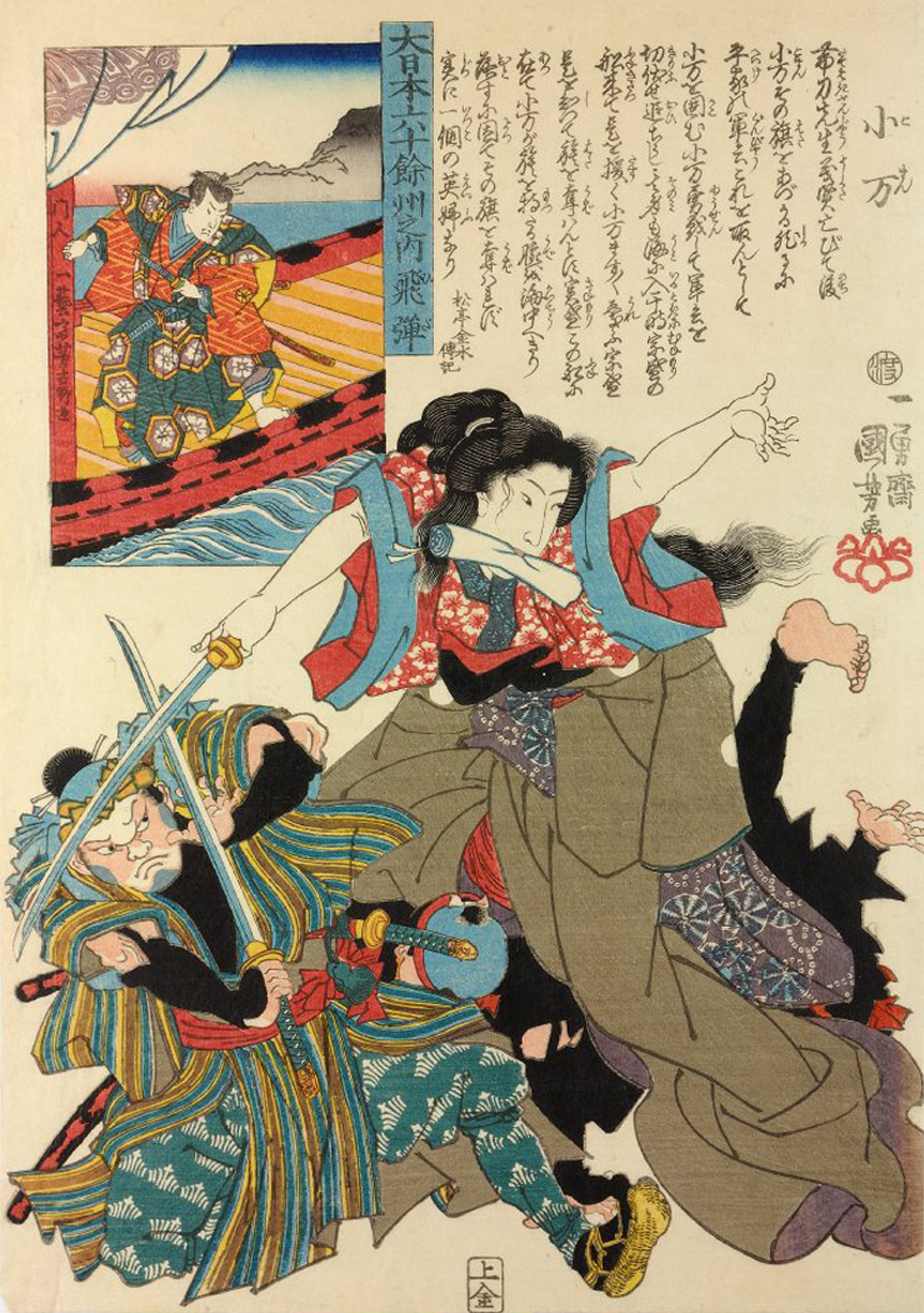
Kenjutsu practitioner (swordswoman) in a duel

Because of the influence of Edo neo-Confucianism (1600–1868), the status of the onna-musha diminished significantly, their duties become focused on the home, whilst their husbands became bureaucrats or police agents.

Travel during the Edo period was demanding and unsettling for many female samurai due to tight restrictions. They always had to be accompanied by a man, since they were not allowed to travel by themselves. Additionally, they had to possess specific permits establishing their business and motives. Bushi women also received much harassment from officials who manned inspection checkpoints.

The onset of the 17th century marked a significant transformation in the social acceptance of women in Japan. Many samurai viewed women purely as child bearers; the concept of a woman being a fit companion for war was no longer conceivable. The relationship between a husband and wife could be correlated to that of a lord and his vassal. According to Ellis Amdur, "husbands and wives did not even customarily sleep together. The husband would visit his wife to initiate any sexual activity and afterwards would retire to his own room".

Not all women focused on use of the naginata. Sasaki Rui and Nakazawa Koto are examples of women who became prominent swordswomen in the Edo period.

In 1868, during the Battle of Aizu in the Boshin War, Nakano Takeko, a member of the Aizu clan, was recruited to become leader of a female corps Jōshitai (娘子隊, Girls' Army), which fought against the onslaught of 20,000 soldiers of the Imperial Japanese Army of the Ōgaki Domain. Highly skilled at the naginata, Takeko and her corps of about 20 women joined 3000 other Aizu samurai in battle. The Hōkai-ji in Aizubange, Fukushima province contains a monument erected in her honor. Yamamoto Yaeko, Matsudaira Teru and Yamakawa Futaba also served in defending Aizuwakamatsu Castle during the Battle of Aizu. Yaeko would later be one of the first civil leaders for women's rights in Japan.

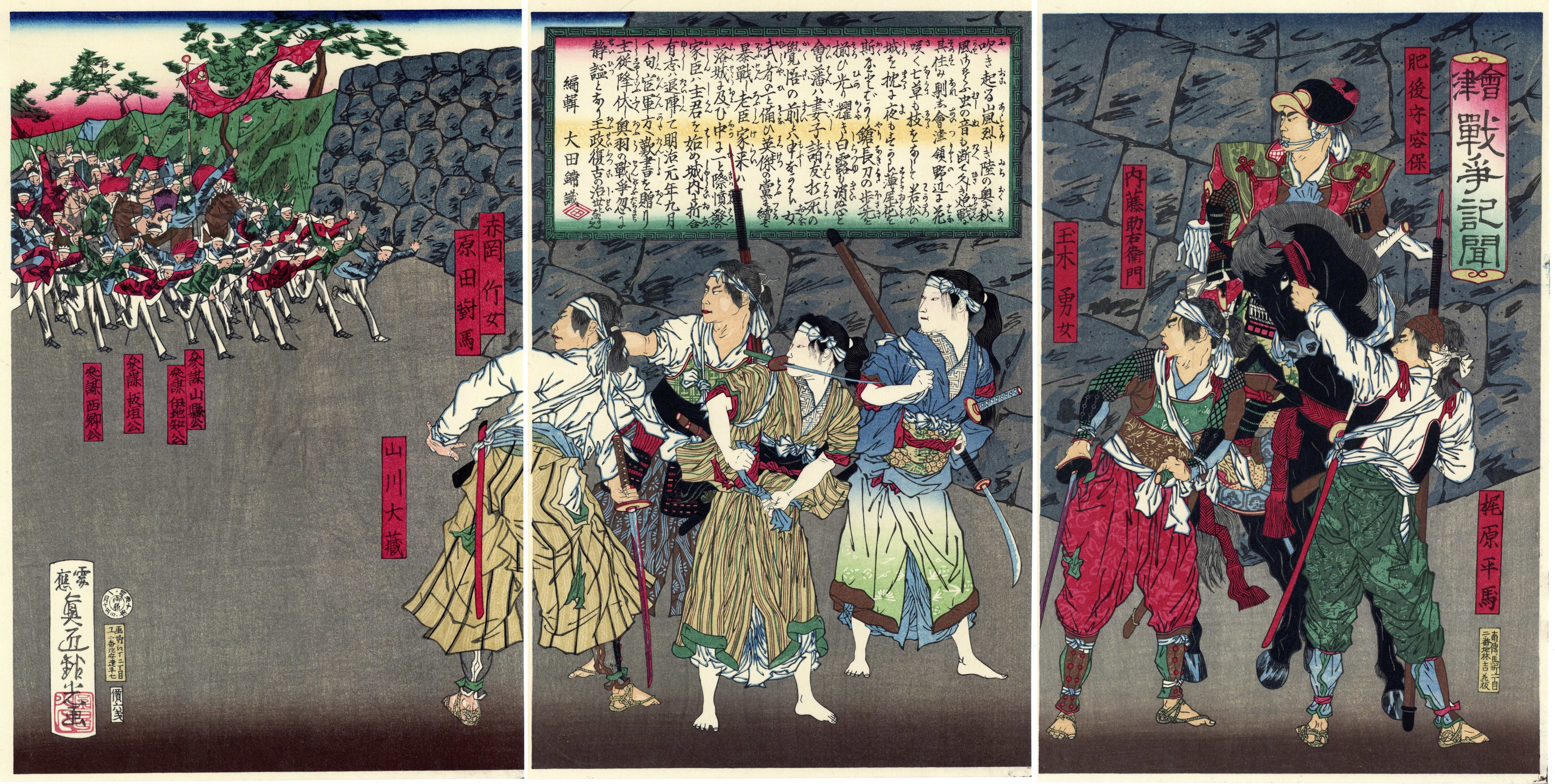
Onna-musha at the Battle of Aizu (by Adachi Ginko 1877)

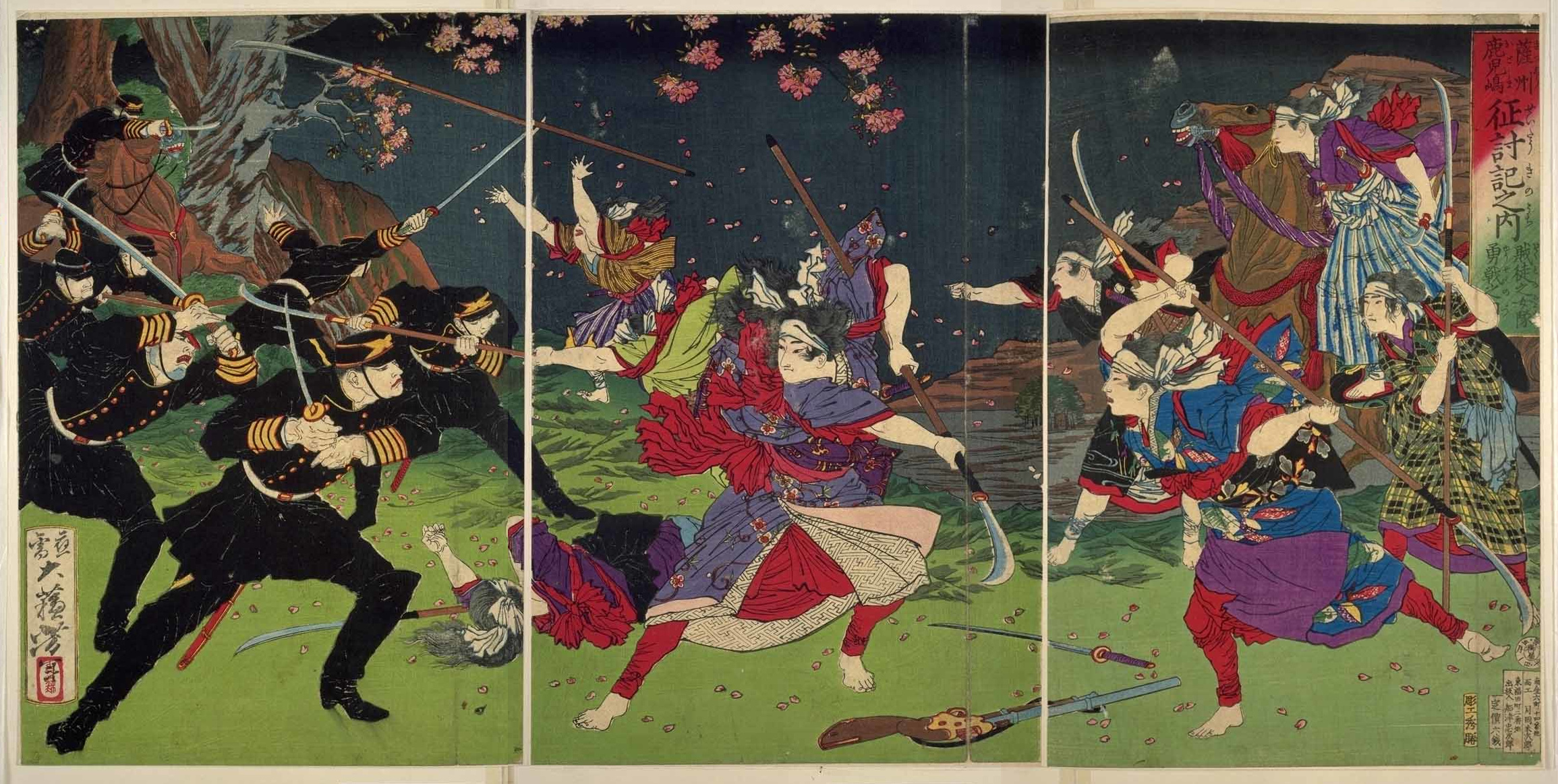
Women fighting the Imperial army during the Subjugation of Kagoshima in Sasshu (Satsuma), by Yoshitoshi, 1877

== Weapons ==
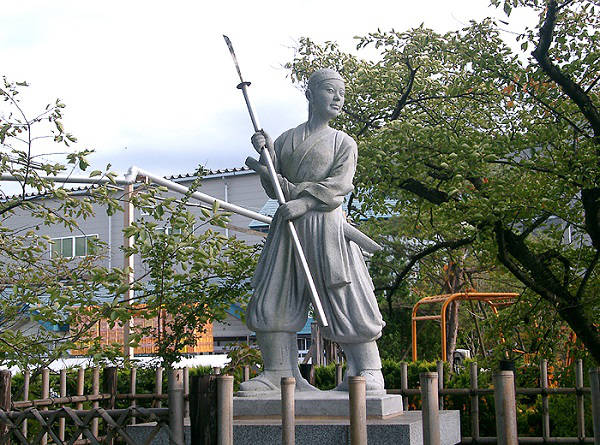
Nakano Takeko holding a naginata

The most popular weapon-of-choice of onna-musha is the naginata, which is a versatile, conventional polearm with a curved blade at the tip. The weapon is mainly favored for its length, which can compensate for the reach difference and the body size advantage of male opponents.

The naginata has a niche between the katana and the yari, which is rather effective in close quarter melee when the opponent is kept at bay, and is also relatively efficient against cavalry. Through its use by many legendary onna-musha women, the naginata has become the iconic armament of the woman warrior. During the Edo period, many schools focusing on the use of the naginata were created and perpetuated its association with women.

Additionally, as most of the time their primary purpose as onna-musha was to safeguard their homes from marauders, emphasis was laid on ranged weapons to be shot from defensive structures.

== Legacy ==
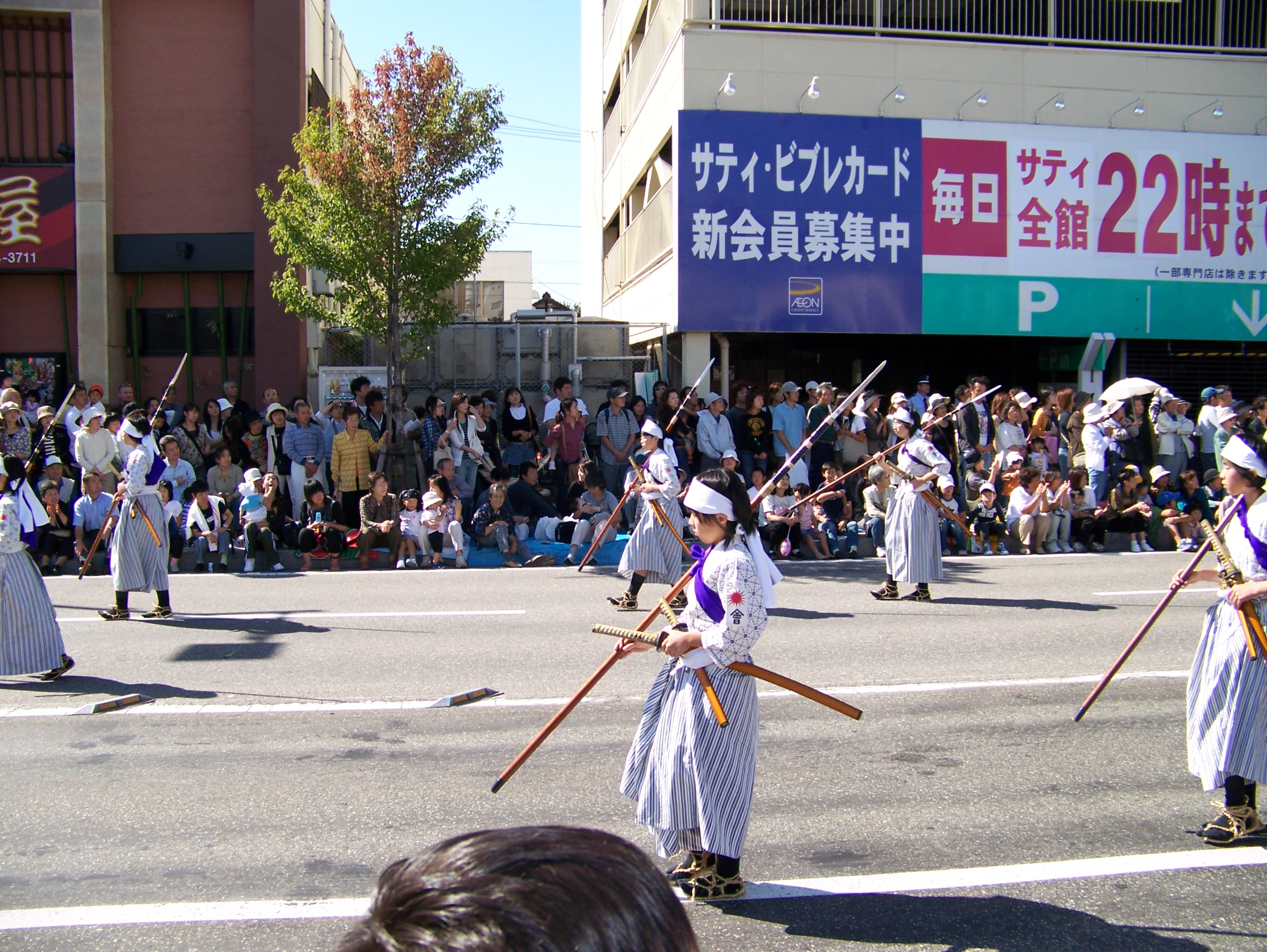
A group of girls celebrating the women army in Aizu Parade

The image of bushi onna-musha women continues to be impactful in martial arts, historical novels, books, and popular culture in general. Like kunoichi (female ninja) and geisha, the onna-musha's conduct is seen as the ideal of Japanese women in movies, animations and TV series. In the West, the onna-musha gained popularity when the historical documentary Samurai Warrior Queens aired on the Smithsonian Channel. Several other channels reprised the documentary. The 56th NHK taiga drama, Naotora: The Lady Warlord, was the first NHK drama where the female protagonist is the head of a samurai clan. The 52nd NHK taiga drama, Yae no Sakura, focuses on Niijima Yae, a woman warrior who fought in Boshin War. This drama portrays Nakano Takeko, Matsudaira Teru, and other onna-musha. Another taiga dramas that portrays the famous onna-musha Tomoe Gozen is Yoshitsune, broadcast in 2005.

In Japan, Tomoe Gozen and Nakano Takeko influenced naginata schools and their techniques. Whether formed by men or women, these schools usually revere the onna-musha. During the annual Aizu Autumn Festival, a group of young girls wearing hakama and shiro headbands take part in the procession, commemorating the actions of Nakano and the Jōshitai (Girls' Army). Other important examples are Yamakawa Futaba and Niijima Yae, who become symbols of the struggle for Japanese women's rights. Some of the onna-musha have become symbolic of a city or prefecture. Ii Naotora and Tachibana Ginchiyo are often celebrated at the Hamamatsu and Yanagawa festivals respectively. The warrior nun Myōrin is celebrated in the Tsurusaki region of the Ōita city, and Ōhōri Tsuruhime is the protagonist in local folklore and festivals on Ōmishima island. Several other samurai-class women are celebrated in pop culture, commerce, and folklore.

== Famous onna-musha ==
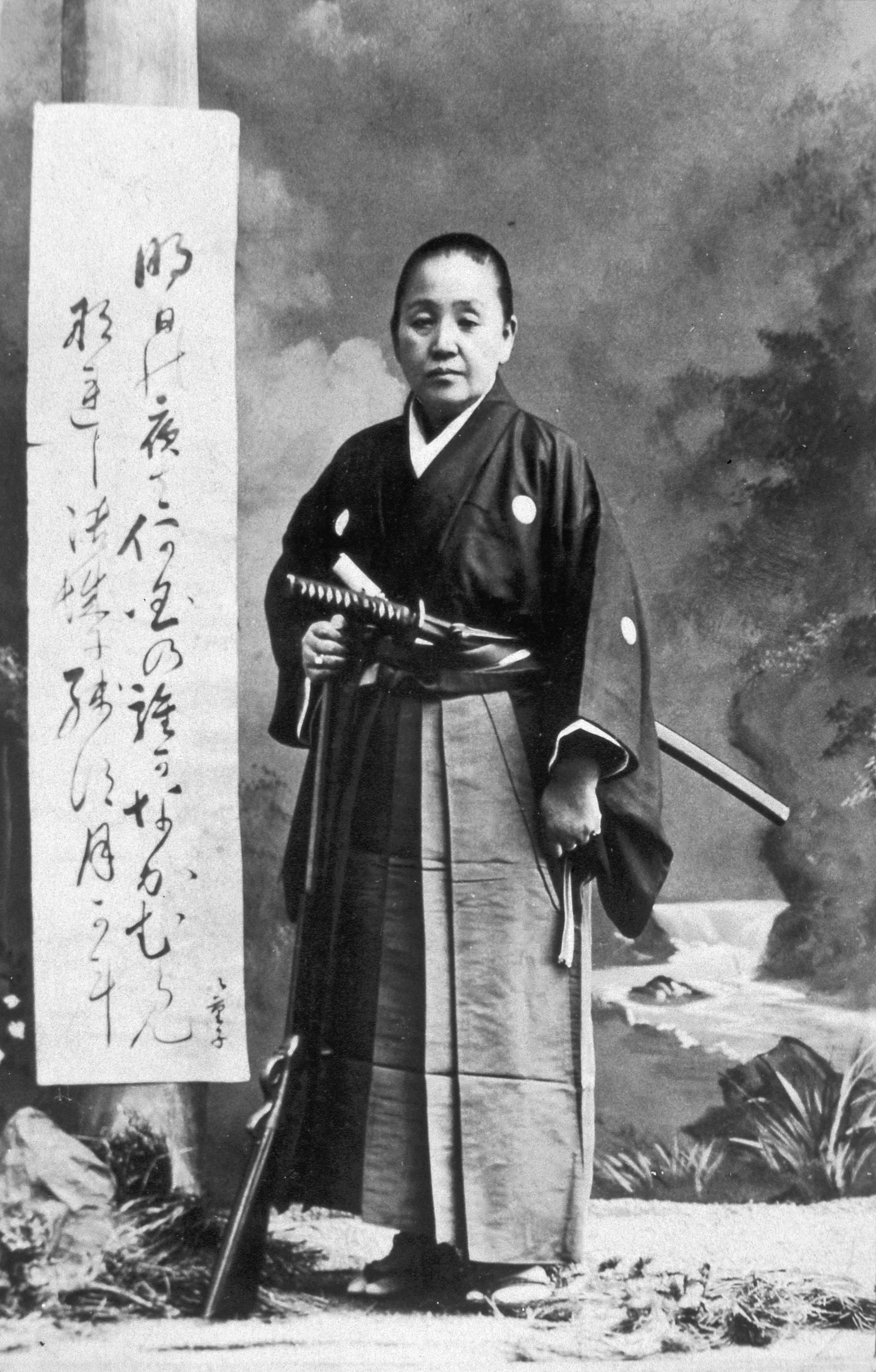
Niijima Yae with her katana, rifle, and waka poem

Some historical and legendary onna-musha include:

- Empress Jingū (169–269): A semi-legendary regent empress who is said to have led the invasion of Korean Peninsula.
- Nakano Takeko (1847–1868): The leader of the Jōshitai (Girls' Army), she participated in the Boshin war, leading several women in a charge against the Imperial forces. Due to the reforms of the Meiji era, Takeko and the women of Jōshitai were some of the last samurai in history.
- Niijima Yae (1845–1932): She was one of the last samurai in history. She fought in the Boshin War and served as a nurse in the Russo-Japanese War and the Sino-Japanese War. Later she became a scholar and became one of the symbols of the struggle for women's rights. Niijima was one of the first people to be decorated by the Meiji Empire.
- Tomoe Gozen (12th century): Her story in The Tale of the Heike influenced several generations of samurai.
- Yodo-dono (1569–1615): A noblewoman who was the castellan of Yodo castle and later became the real head of Osaka castle. She led many political events after the death of her husband, Hideyoshi. As guardian of Hideyori (Hideyoshi's son), she challenged the Tokugawa clan, thus leading the Siege of Osaka, the last battle of the Sengoku period that ended the period of war for the next 250 years.

=== Others ===
Name	Birth	Death	Period
Akai Teruko	1514	1594	Sengoku
Yamakawa Futaba	1844	1909	Meiji
Ashikaga Ujinohime	1574	1620	Sengoku – Edo
Ōhōri Tsuruhime	1526	1543	Sengoku
Tachibana Ginchiyo	1569	1602	Sengoku
Kaihime	1572	after 1615	Sengoku
Myorin			Sengoku
Hangaku Gozen			Heian – Kamakura
Harima no Tsubone			Kamakura
Komatsuhime	1573	1620	Sengoku – Edo
Maeda Matsu	1547	1617	Sengoku – Edo
Nakazawa Koto	1839	1927	Bakumatsu
Sasaki Rui			Edo
Lady Ichikawa		1585	Sengoku
Ikeda Sen		1599	Sengoku
Matsudaira Teru	1833	1884	Edo – Meiji
Miyohime	1553	1615	Sengoku
Otazu no kata	1550	1568	Sengoku
Onamihime	1541	1602	Sengoku
Lady Otsuya		1575	Sengoku
Ueno Tsuruhime		1577	Sengoku
Katakura Kita	1538	1610	Sengoku
Fujishiro Gozen			Sengoku
Kamehime	1560	1625	Sengoku – Edo
Katō Tsune			Sengoku
Kushihashi Teru	1553	1627	Sengoku – Edo
Myōki			Sengoku
Numata Jakō	1544	1615	Sengoku – Edo
Oni Gozen			Sengoku
Okaji no Kata	1578	1642	Sengoku – Edo
Okyō		1589	Sengoku
Omasa		1602	Sengoku
Shigashi		1587	Sengoku
Lady Shirai		1565	Sengoku
Yuki no Kata			Sengoku
Seishin-ni	1585	1644	Sengoku – Edo
Tōshōin	c. 1460		Sengoku
Jinbo Yukiko	1845	1868	Edo

== See also ==
- Empress of Japan
- Female castellans in Japan
- Himeyuri students
- Himiko
- Kunoichi
- Toyo (queen)
- Woman warrior
- Chronology of women's participation in warfare in Japan

== Sources ==
- Beasley, W. G. (1999). The Japanese Experience: A Short History of Japan. Berkeley, Calif.: University of California Press. ISBN 0520225600. OCLC 1200488838.
- Jansen, Marius B. (2000). The Making of Modern Japan. Cambridge, Mass.: The Belknap Press of Harvard University Press. ISBN 9780674003347. OCLC 1036585437.
- Yamakawa Kikue (2001). Women of the Mito Domain: Recollections of Samurai Family Life. Translated by Nakai, Kate Wildman. Stanford, Calif.: Stanford University Press. ISBN 9780804731492. OCLC 44066977. University of Tokyo Press edition.
