= Hangaku Gozen =

Female samurai warrior of the late 12th and early 13th century

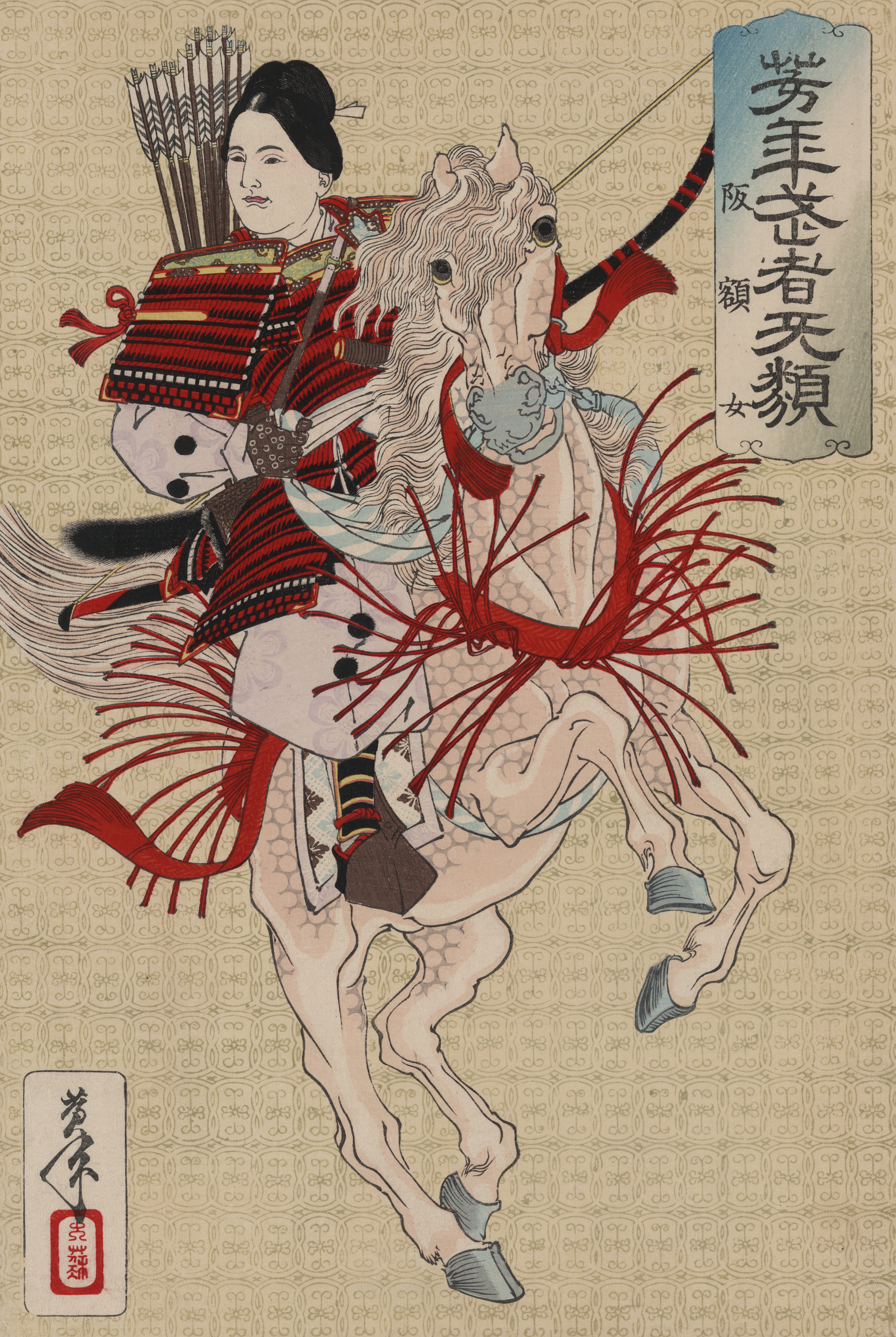
Hangaku Gozen, woodblock print by Tsukioka Yoshitoshi, c. 1885

Lady Hangaku (坂額御前, Hangaku Gozen) was a onna-musha warrior, one of the few Japanese warrior women commonly known in history or classical literature. She took a prominent role in the Kennin Rebellion, an uprising against the Kamakura shogunate in 1201. While she is occasionally referred to as "Itagaku Gozen" in some English-language academic sources due to a misreading of the first kanji character (板), her correct historical name is Hangaku Gozen.

== Early life ==
She lived during the end of the Heian and the beginning of the Kamakura periods. Her other names include Hangaku (板額 or 飯角). She was the daughter of a warrior named Jō Sukekuni (城資国), and her siblings were Jō Sukenaga (城資永) and Jō Nagamochi (城長茂) (or Sukemochi (助茂)).

== Career and capture ==
Hangaku Gozen was a member of the Taira clan and lived with her family in Echigo. Also known as Hangaku Itazaki, she was the daughter of Jo Sukenaga, who was defeated by Kiso Yoshinaka in battle. She joined her uncle, Jo Nagamochi, and cousin, Jo Sukemori, in the Kennin Rebellion of 1201, and became an integral part of their defensive operations at Torisaka Castle. Hangaku was noted for her leadership and bravery during the three-month long defense during which she and Sukemori led forces of men against Sasaki Moritsuna's bakufu army, who were loyal to the Kamakura Shogunate. "Dressed as a boy", Hangaku stood on the tower of the castle and all those that came to attack her were shot down by her arrows which pierced them either in their chests or their heads.

The rebel defenses were eventually struck down and Hangaku's fighting stopped only after she was wounded by an arrow that pierced her thigh. She was captured and presented, "fearless as a man and beautiful as a flower", as a prisoner of war to the Shogun Minamoto Yoriiye, who was intrigued by her beauty and reputation. Lady Hangaku was precluded from ritual suicide by the Shogun's orders to marry his retainer, Asari Yoshito. Later, she reportedly delivered a son, but there is little record of the remainder of her life.

== Culture references ==
Hangaku appears in the Azuma Kagami.

Hangaku is said to have been "fearless as a man and beautiful as a flower," and to have wielded a naginata in battle. Many storytellers and printmakers have portrayed her in their works, including Kuniyoshi, who produced a series of warrior women prints. This series also included such historical or literary figures as Tomoe Gozen, Shizuka Gozen, and Hōjō Masako.
