= Seishin-ni =

21st head of the Hachinohe clan

Seishin-ni (清心尼, 1585/1586 – June 1644), born as Hachinohe Neneko (八戸 子子子) or Nene (祢々), Mego (女古,女子) was a Japanese noble woman from the Sengoku period and early Edo period. She became the 21st leader of the Hachinohe clan after the death of her husband, Hachinohe Naomasa, in 1614.

== Life ==
Hachinohe Neneko born in 1585 or 1586, she was the daughter of the 19th head of Hachinohe clan, Hachinohe Naoe, and her mother was Lady Chiyoko (Nanbu Nobunao's daughter), a noble lady of the powerful Nanbu clan. In 1595, Naoe died early, and at the age of 10, Neneko married Hachinohe Naomasa, who was one year younger.

In June 1614, months before the Siege of Osaka began, Naomasa died in Takada, Echigo Province, and their son Hisamatsu died shortly afterwards, so Neneko became the head of the family. This was due to the order of Nanbu Toshinao, the lord of the Nanbu clan. Toshinao advised her to remarry, but she refused, shaved her hair, became a nun, and changed her name to Seishin-ni. Toshinao further recommended adoption with the Nanbu hanshi, but Seishin-ni also refused.

In 1620, the Nitta clan, a family related to the Hachinohe clan, handed over Naoyoshi to marry their second daughter, succeeding the clan's leadership. In 1627, Toshinao transferred Naoyoshi from Nejo to Tono, Seishin-ni followed. As Naoyoshi was primarily in Morioka as the Southern Clan's main retainer, Seishin-ni later ruled over Tono.

Seishin-ni died at Yokota Castle in June 1644.

== In popular culture ==
=== Novels ===
- "Katadzuno!" (2014) by Kyoko Nakajima
- "Seishin-ni" (2017) by Jikoku Matsuda Manga
- "Katadzuno!" (2019) by Tomoko Sato, based on the original work by Kyoko Nakajima.

== See also ==
- List of female castellans in Japan
