= Sugiyama =

Sugiyama (written: 杉山, lit. "Japanese cedar, mountain") is a Japanese surname. Notable people with the surname include:

== Sport and martial arts ==
- Ai Sugiyama, Japanese professional tennis player
- Danto Sugiyama (杉山 弾斗, born 1999), Japanese footballer
- Kento Sugiyama, Japanese baseball player
- Kota Sugiyama, Japanese football player
- Marcos Sugiyama, Brazilian Japanese volleyball player
- Naho Sugiyama (杉山 直歩, born 1978), Japanese mixed martial artist
- Ryuichi Sugiyama, Japanese football player
- Sachiko Sugiyama, Japanese volleyball player
- Shojiro Sugiyama (杉山 尚次郎, 1929–2015), Shotokan karate instructor
- Susumu Sugiyama (杉山進, 1932–2025), Japanese alpine skier
- Takeo Sugiyama (杉山 武雄, born 1933), Japanese basketball player
- Tetsu Sugiyama (杉山 哲, born 1981), Japanese footballer
- Tsuneharu Sugiyama (杉山 恒治, 1940–2002), Japanese sport wrestler

== Science ==
- Kozo Sugiyama, a researcher in graph layout, author of Sugiyama algorithm.
- Linda Sugiyama, American plasma physicist

== Arts and entertainment ==
- Heiichi Sugiyama, Japanese poet and film critic
- Kazuko Sugiyama, Japanese voice actress
- Kira Sugiyama, Japanese photographer
- Kiyotaka Sugiyama, Japanese singer-songwriter
- Koichi Sugiyama, Japanese composer and council member of JASRAC
- Noriaki Sugiyama, Japanese voice actor
- Riho Sugiyama, Japanese voice actress
- Yasushi Sugiyama, Japanese watercolor painter

== Military history ==
- Sugiyama Gengo, another name for Japanese samurai Ishida Shigenari
- Hajime Sugiyama, Japanese World War II field marshal

== Other ==
- Akiko Sugiyama, Palauan politician
- Kozo Sugiyama, Japanese computer scientist and graph drawing researcher
- Peter Sugiyama (1943–2007), Palauan politician
- Shinsuke J. Sugiyama, Japanese diplomat

== See also ==
- 29624 Sugiyama, a main-belt asteroid
- Sugiyama Jogakuen University, a private women's college in Nagoya, Japan
