= Lady Shirai =

16th century Japanese noble lady

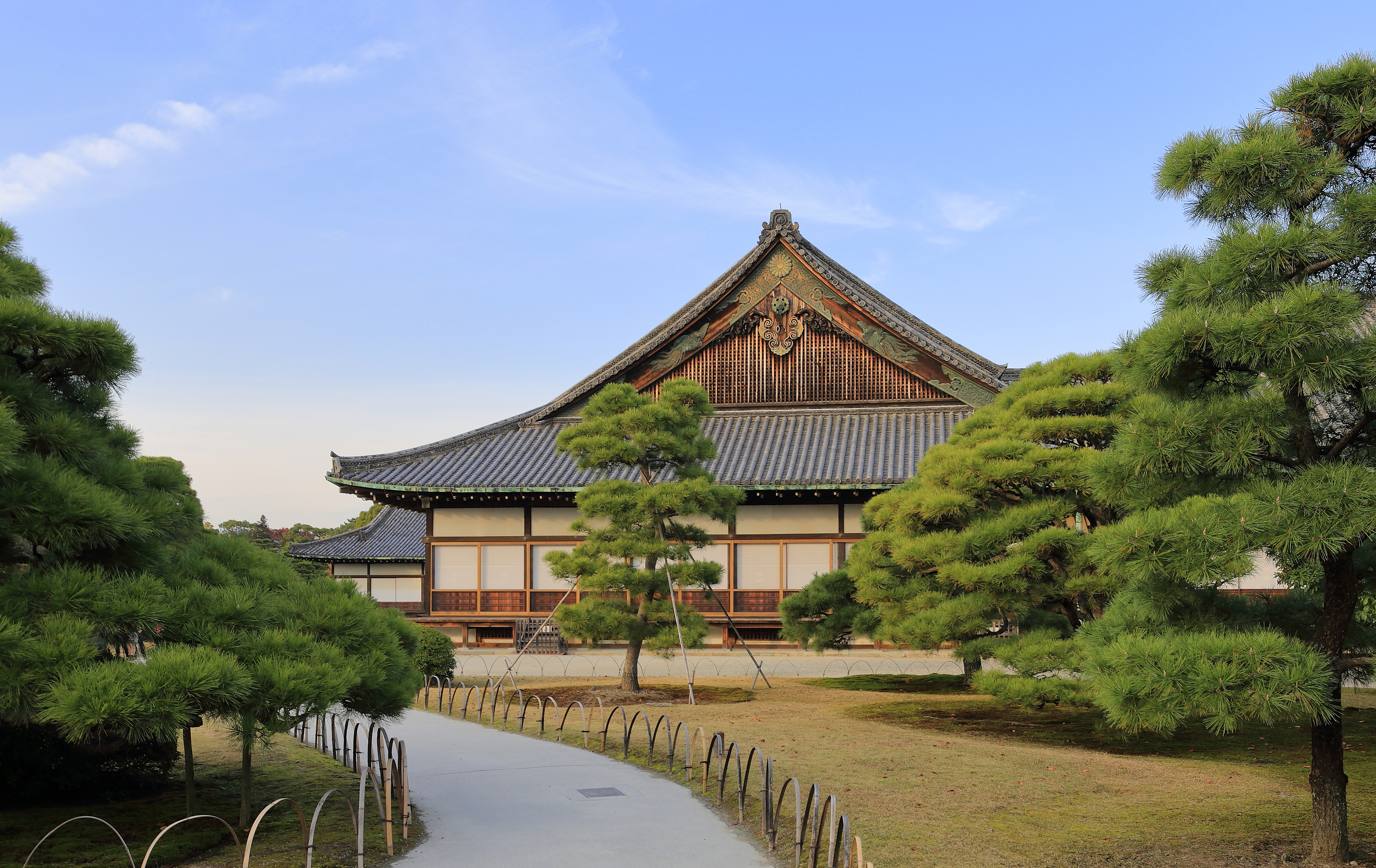
Ninomaru Palace

Lady Shirai (白井局 Shirai no Tsubone, d. 1565) was a Japanese noble lady and aristocrat from the Sengoku period. She was born to the Nagao clan in Shirai, who were head retainers to the Uesugi clan in Kantō. She was the wife of Narita Nagayasu, the lord of Oshi castle in Musashi. She is also thought to be either the daughter or granddaughter of Nagao Kageharu. Lady Shirai was a retainer of the Ashikaga Shogunate, fought and died during the Incident of Kyoto in 1565, when Ashikaga Yoshiteru was killed.

== Life ==
Lady Shirai was a relative of Nagao Kagetora (the famed Uesugi Kensin). In 1560, Uesugi Kenshin, a warlord of Echigo province, made large expedition to Kanto region against the Later Hōjō clan. Nagayasu Narita, once belonged to Kenshin, but there arose a quarrel between Kenshin and Nagayasu and Kenshin insulted him, thus furious Nagayasu left Kenshin and went back to Hojo clan. After that Narita clan had been an important retainer of Hojo clan, and expanded Oshi castle as a basement of this area.

Lady Shirai would divorce her husband once he turned his back on the Uesugi clan, and serve the 13th Shōgun, Ashikaga Yoshiteru. At this point, she was over 50 years old, but she was still beautiful, and as she always served in close proximity to Yoshiteru she used the opportunity to talk about Uesugi Kenshin, and build a diplomatic bridge between the two figures.

Yoshiteru declared war on Miyoshi Nagayoshi because Miyoshi had a great influence in the capital. Nagayoshi continued as the real power in Kyoto. In 1565, Miyoshi Yoshitsugu laid siege against the Ninomaru Palace and Honmaru Palace (currently Nijō Castle). With no help arriving in time from the Daimyōs that could have supported him, Yoshiteru and the few troops under him were overrun by the Miyoshi. Lady Shirai took her naginata and fought for the last time. When Matsunaga Hisahide entered the Yoshiteru's Palace, the Shogun committed suicide, Lady Shirai continues to resist and ends up dying in battle.

It is unclear if she gave birth to Nagayasu's sons. If so, she was the paternal grandmother of Kaihime along with the maternal one, Akai Teruko.
