= Shigeru Aoki (disambiguation) =

Shigeru Aoki may refer to:

- Shigeru Aoki (青木 繁, 1882–1911), Japanese painter
- Shigeru Aoki (青木 茂), mayor of Toyohashi city, Aichi Prefecture, Japan, from 1975 to 1983

== See also ==
- Aoki (disambiguation)
- Shigeru
