= Kaihime =

Japanese female warrior

Kaihime 甲斐姫

Personal details
- Born: April 15, 1572
- Died: 17th century (after 1615)
- Parent: Narita Ujinaga (father)
- Relatives: Akai Teruko (maternal grandmother); Lady Shirai (possibly paternal grandmother)

Military service
- Allegiance: Later Hōjō clan Toyotomi clan
- Unit: Narita clan
- Battles/wars: Siege of Oshi; Siege of Osaka

Lady Kai (甲斐姫) ("hime" means lady, princess, woman of noble family), speculated to have been born in April 15, 1572, was a Japanese female warrior, onna-musha from the Sengoku Period. She was a daughter of Narita Ujinaga and granddaughter of Akai Teruko, retainers of the Later Hōjō clan in the Kantō region. She is known as the heroic woman who helped her father's resistance at Oshi Castle against Toyotomi Hideyoshi's army during the siege of Odawara. After the war, she became one of the wives of Hideyoshi. She was known for her bravery and beauty. According to the chronicle of Narita clan, she was praised as "The most beautiful woman in east Japan".（東国無双の美人）

== Biography ==
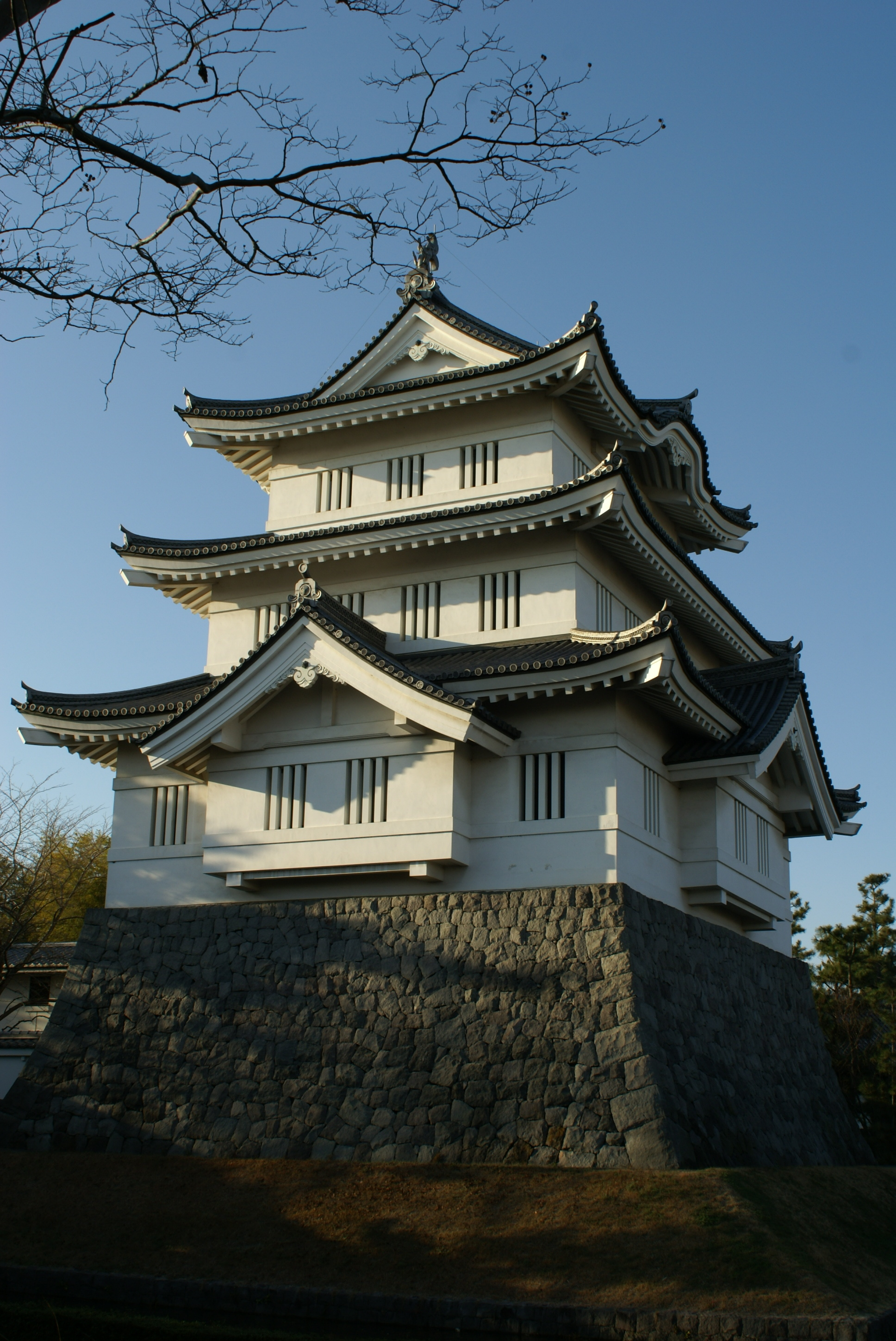
Oshi Castle

In June 1590, Ishida Mitsunari led a 20,000-man army to take Oshi Castle. Mitsunari started to build a large embankment, and completed this embankment in a week. He placed his headquarter at the top of old tomb near the castle, and ordered to pour water into the castle. In a moment Oshi castle was filled with water, and inside people had to evacuate to higher place. The moats around the castle rejected the water attack. The embarkaments built by Toyotomi's men were used against them. Kaihime broke the dikes near the castle, causing massive damage to the Toyotomi army. Owing to lack of foresight and planning, Mitsunari troops was devastated by the water attack.

Kai was said to have volunteered to rout the remaining soldiers, donning armor and riding on horseback with 200 men. When Ishida was reinforced by Sanada Masayuki, Sanada Yukimura and Asano Nagamasa, she was said to have slain the Sanada retainer, Miyage Takashige, in battle, taking his head as her trophy. Her accomplishments gave a huge boost to Narita army morale and forced Mitsunari to retreat, reporting his failure to Hideyoshi.

Mitsunari has been ridiculed among warlords, to this day, the long strait where the Oshi incident occurred is also known as the "Ishida Tsutsumi", it ruined the career of Ishida, who emerged with a sullied image and the reputation of a poor commander. It subsequently affected his ability to gain the loyalty and support of Japan's other powerful daimyo after the death of Toyotomi Hideyoshi. This lack of support eventually contributed to his defeat at the 1600 Battle of Sekigahara.

The Oshi castle was defended with a small number of soldiers and peasants, only fell when Hojo Ujimasa was defeated in Odawara. When Odawara Castle surrendered, Kaihime's father also chose to do the same with the hope of ending warfare.

She and her father were put under Gamō Ujisato's care for a time. Sometime when her father was away, an internal rebellion was caused by Hamada Shugen and his younger brother (historical records suggest that the revolt was actually started by Ujinaga's brothers). During this time, Kai's mother-in-law was killed. As soon as she heard about the incident, Kai brandished a sword and sought to end the rebels. She slew the instigator and two followers, effectively repressing the bloodshed. Hideyoshi heard of her bravery and married her. As a result, her father became one of Hideyoshi's trusted generals. He was rewarded with Karasuyama Castle and 20,000 koku.

Much later, near the end of the siege of Osaka's summer campaign, she is said to have fled the flames of Osaka Castle with Toyotomi Hideyori's concubine (Oiwa no kata) and Hideyori's daughter (Nāhime). It is said that Kaihime personally defended Nāhime from Tokugawa troops, and three of them became nuns at Tōkei-ji.

== In popular culture ==
- Kaihime appears in Koei's Samurai Warriors video game series, where her weapon is a sword-whip. She first appears in Samurai Warriors 3 and reappears in Samurai Warriors 4, Warriors Orochi 3, and Warriors Orochi 4.
  - Her Samurai Warriors 3 incarnation is also a playable character in Pokémon Conquest, in which her partner Pokémon are Darumaka and its evolution Darmanitan.
- She appears in Magitech Corporation's video game Takeda 3 as a prominent character under the name Narita Kaihime.
- She is an obtainable unit in the mobile game The Battle Cats.
- She also appears as a character in Irem's trading card video game Sengoku Efuda-yugi: Hotogisu Ran.
- Professional wrestler Hiroyo Matsumoto wrestled as Kaihime for the Dramatic Dream Team promotion on February 10, 2013.
- Portrayed by Nana Eikura in the 2012 movie The Floating Castle.

== See also ==
- Onna-musha – Female samurai warriors

== Sources ==
- Himegimi-tachi no Dai Sengoku Emaki (姫君たちの大戦国絵巻); ISBN 978-4-404-03705-3
- Narita-ki (成田記)、小沼十五郎保道著、大澤俊吉訳・解説、歴史図書社、1980年
