= Myojin =

Myōjin (明神) is a title for Shinto gods.

It is also a Japanese surname. It can refer to:

- Myōjin Yahiko, a Rurouni Kenshin character
- Tomokazu Myojin, a Japanese footballer
- Myojin, a Japanese samurai woman
- Myojin parakaryote, an incertae sedis unicellular organism
