= Shigeru Uchida =

Shigeru Uchida may refer to:

- Shigeru Uchida (golfer)
- Shigeru Uchida (politician)
