= Siege of Oshi =

1590 siege

- Part of Supremacy of Toyotomi Hideyoshi
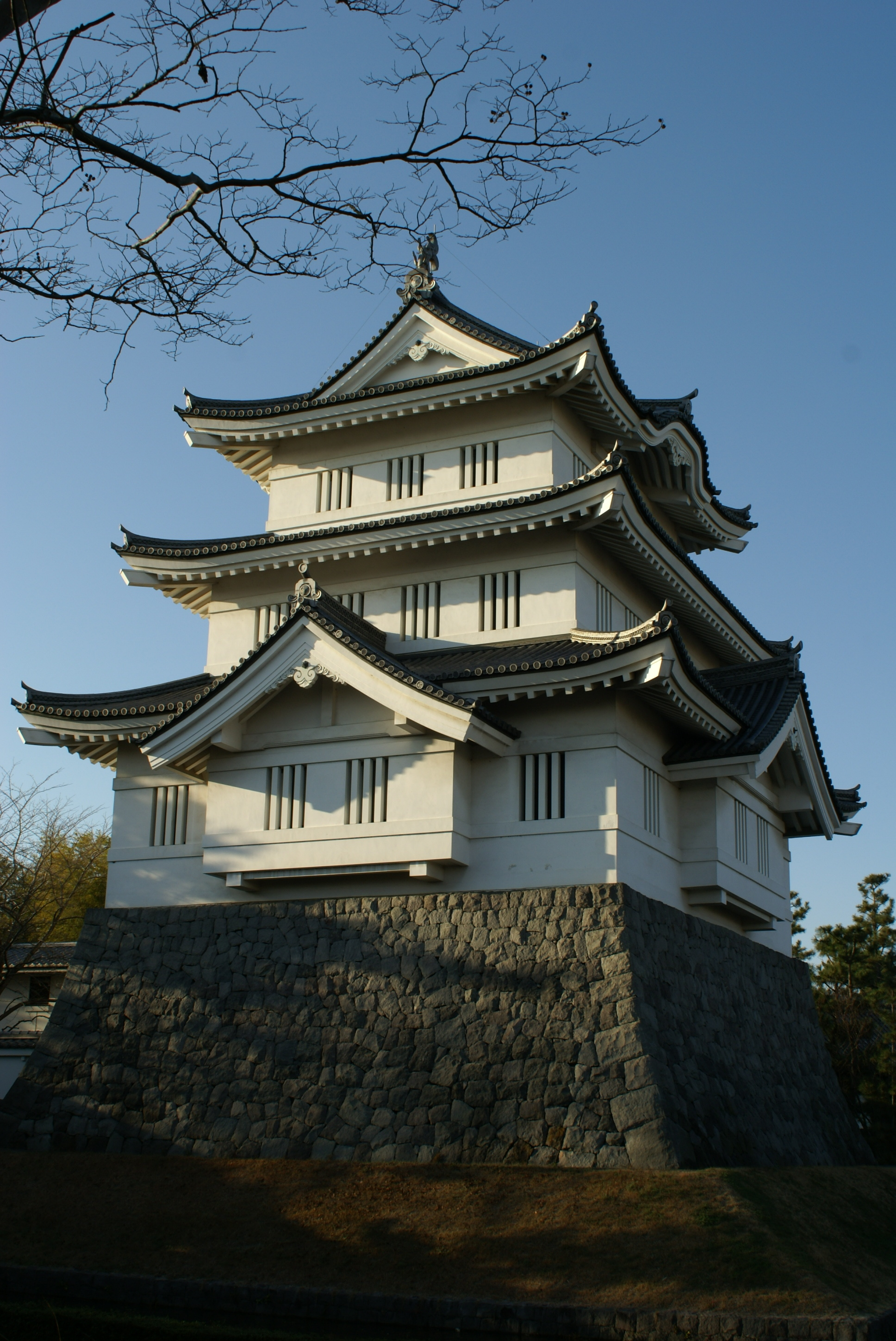
- Oshi Castle
Date	1590
Location	Musashi Province 36°8′13.74″N 139°27′10.36″E
Result	Toyotomi victory

Belligerents
Hōjō forces	Toyotomi forces

Commanders and leaders
Narita Nagachika; Masaki Tanba; Kaihime	Ishida Mitsunari; Ōtani Yoshitsugu; Natsuka Masaie; Akaza Naoyasu; Satake Yoshinobu; Sanada Yukimura

Strength
619 samurai 2,000 local peoples	23,000 troops

The 1590 siege of Oshi (忍城の戦い, Oshi-jō no tatakai) was one of many battles in Toyotomi Hideyoshi's campaigns against the Hōjō clan during Japan's Sengoku period.

== Background ==
Oshi Castle was a stronghold of the Narita clan in north-central Musashi Province. The Narita were originally vassals of the Ogigayatsu Uesugi clan and under the leadership of Narita Akiyasu completed Oshi Castle around 1479. The castle was built on a small elevation near the Tone River and used surrounding marshes and swamplands as part of its outer defenses. It was regarded as one of the seven most important strongholds of the Kantō region.

The Narita clan changed their allegiance to the Odawara Hōjō clan following the defeat of the Uesugi clan at the siege of Kawagoe Castle in 1546. Fourteen years later Uesugi Kenshin, the daimyō of the Uesugi clan, invaded the area in support of Uesugi Norimasa (the Shōgun's deputy or Kanto kanrei). This forced Narita Nagayasu, the Castellan of Oshi Castle to sever his ties to the Odawara Hōjō. However, after a quarrel with Uesugi Kenshin, the enraged Narita switched back to the Odawara Hōjō clan. In reprisal, Uesugi Kenshin burned down the town around the castle in 1574.

== Siege ==
During the siege of Odawara in 1590, the daimyō Toyotomi Hideyoshi dispatched one of his senior retainers, Ishida Mitsunari, on an expedition to reduce the outlying castles still loyal to the Odawara Hōjō clan throughout Musashi Province. Three days after capturing Tatebayashi Castle, Ishida's forces of 23,000 troops arrived at Oshi. On arrival they discovered that the Narita clan leader, Narita Ujinaga, was at Odawara with the bulk of his forces. He had left his home castle defended by only 619 samurai and 2000 local conscripts led by his daughter Kaihime and younger brother Narita Nagachika.

After the castle refused to surrender, the castle held off numerous attacks from Ishida's forces. This included a copy-cat effort to flood the defenders using the same method that Hideyoshi used at his famous siege of Takamatsu. Despite Ishida's impressive construction of 28 kilometers of dikes and torrential rains, the castle still held for over a month.

Eventually the defenders only surrendered after hearing word that their lord, Narita Ujinaga had been defeated at Odawara.

== Legacy ==
Oshi Castle gained fame from the siege as the “floating castle”.

But it also ruined the career of Ishida, who emerged with a sullied image and the reputation of a poor commander. It subsequently affected his ability to gain the loyalty and support of Japan's other powerful daimyo after the death of Toyotomi Hideyoshi. This lack of support eventually contributed to his defeat at the 1600 Battle of Sekigahara.

== In popular culture ==
- The Floating Castle (2012) by Shinji Higuchi and Isshin Inudo is a comedy-drama film which relates the events of the siege of Oshi.

== See also ==
- Kaihime
