= Akai Teruko =

16th-century samurai

Akai Teruko 赤井輝子

Lord of Ushiku (Yura clan head)
- In office 1591
- Succeeded by: Yura Kunishige

Personal details
- Spouse: Yura Shigeru
- Children: Yura Kinishige; Nagao Akinaga
- Parent: Akai Terumitsu (father)
- Relatives: Kaihime (granddaughter)

Military service
- Allegiance: Akai clan Later Hōjō clan Toyotomi clan
- Unit: Yura clan
- Battles/wars: Siege of Kanayama castle Siege of Odawara (1590); Siege of Matsuida castle

Akai Teruko 赤井輝子 (or Myoin-ni 妙印尼; 6 November 1514 – 17 December 1594) was a late-Sengoku period Onna-musha warrior. Teruko was a woman trained in ko-naginata, fought in many battles when younger and commanded three thousand soldiers in Kanayama castle at 70 years old.

She was a daughter of Akai Terumitsu, spouse of Yura Shigeru, a retainer of the Hōjō clan, and grandmother of Kaihime.

In contrast to her famous granddaughter, Kaihime, who was known as "The most beautiful woman in east Japan" (東国無双の美人), Teruko was known as ''The strongest woman in the Warring States Period'' (戦国時代最強の女丈夫).

== Early life ==
Teruko was born as the daughter of Tatebayashi Castle lord Akai Terumitsu. According to legend, Teruko's father saved a young fox from naughty children, and then in the evening an Inari appeared and recommended a location for his castle, drawing a design for the fortifications on the ground by its tail. The castle that Teruko lived during her early life was the target of constant threats from the Uesugi, Takeda and Later Hōjō clans. There are no details about Teruko's life with her father, but it is likely that she was trained in military skills from the early age.

== Arrival to the Yura clan ==
Terumitsu proposed a political marriage between Teruko and Yura Shigeru, the head of the Yura clan and lord of Kanayama castle in currently Gunma Prefecture. During the marriage to Shigeru, she gave birth to Yura Kunishige and Nagao Akinaga. She had a daughter who married the lord of Oshi castle, Narita Ujinaga, during the wedding Teruko's daughter gave birth to Kaihime.

Teruko's husband, Shigeru, was a warlord who played independence as a Sengoku feudal lord, and switched forces in front of the powerful forces Uesugi and Hojo. The Yura family has been a role of intermediary between the Echiso Alliance, which is the alliance between Uesugi and Hojo. In 1578, Shigeru died of illness, so his son Kunishige took over the leadership of the clan. After her husband's death, Teruko becomes a Buddhist nun by changing her name to Myoin-ni (妙印尼). Because Kunishige proved unable to lead the clan, Myoin-ni (Teruko) acquired substantial political power and acted actively in the administration of her family's domain.

== Struggles with Hojo clan ==
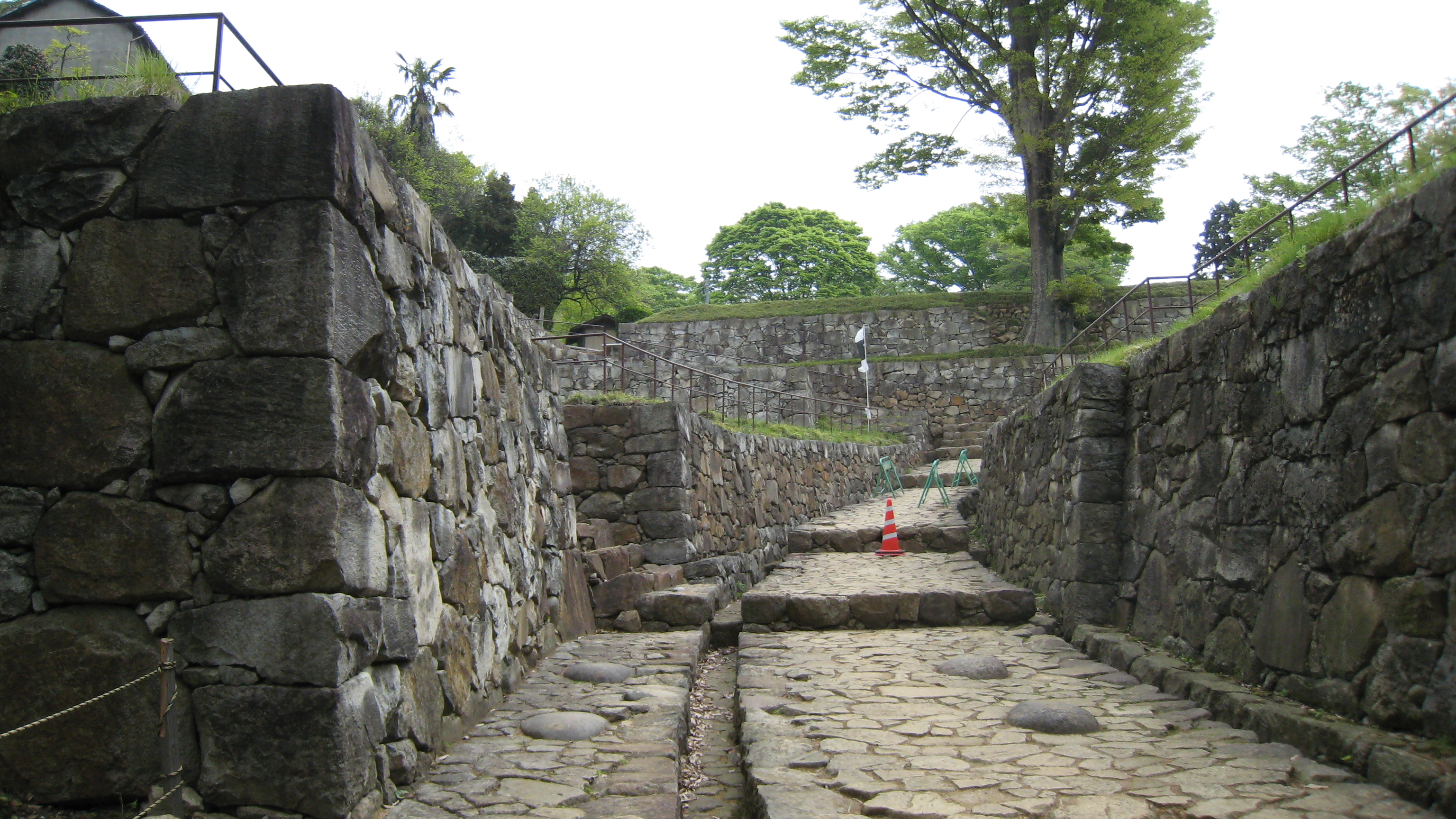
Kanayama castle

When Hōjō clan suddenly exhibited hostility against Yura clan in 1584, Yura Kunishige and his brother Nagao Akinaga were captured by the Hōjō of Odawara. Teruko attempted to ally with Toyotomi Hideyoshi and Tokugawa Ieyasu.

The Hōjō's troops marched to took Kanayama castle. Akai Teruko at the age of 71, commanded the defense of the Battle of Kanayama Castle (1584), she led her 3,000 remaining soldiers and resisted over 15 months, and finally under the condition of returning captured leaders Yura clan voluntary opened Kanayama castle. Although Kanayama Castle was requisitioned by the Hōjō clan, she continued to serve the Yura clan.

At 76 years old, Toyotomi Hideyoshi launched the Conquest of Odawara (1590). At first Teruko was allied with the Hojo clan, she defended Kiryū Castle while her son, Yura Kunishige, was holed-up in Odawara Castle. On the same year, she surrendered via Maeda Toshiie to the Toyotomi army. Thereafter, Teruko cooperated with the Toyotomi by having she and her grandson, Yura Sadashige, lead a contingent of 200 soldiers in support of an assault on Matsuida Castle.

Teruko was greatly admired by Hideyoshi and Toshiie for their heroic deeds as a warrior. Hideyoshi gave her as a reward the territory of 5435 koku in Ushiku, but soon she transferred the property to Kunishige.

== Later life ==
Teruko died in 1594 and was buried in Togetsu-in in Ushiku, Ibaraki Prefecture. She was known as ''The Strongest Woman in the Warring States Period'' (戦国時代最強の女丈夫)

== Popular culture ==
She makes appearances in the Samurai Warriors and Nobunaga's Ambition series of games.

== See also ==
- List of female castellans in Japan
