= Kanayama Castle =

Coordinates: 36°19′4.08″N 139°22′38.91″E

- 金山城
- Ōta, Gunma, Japan
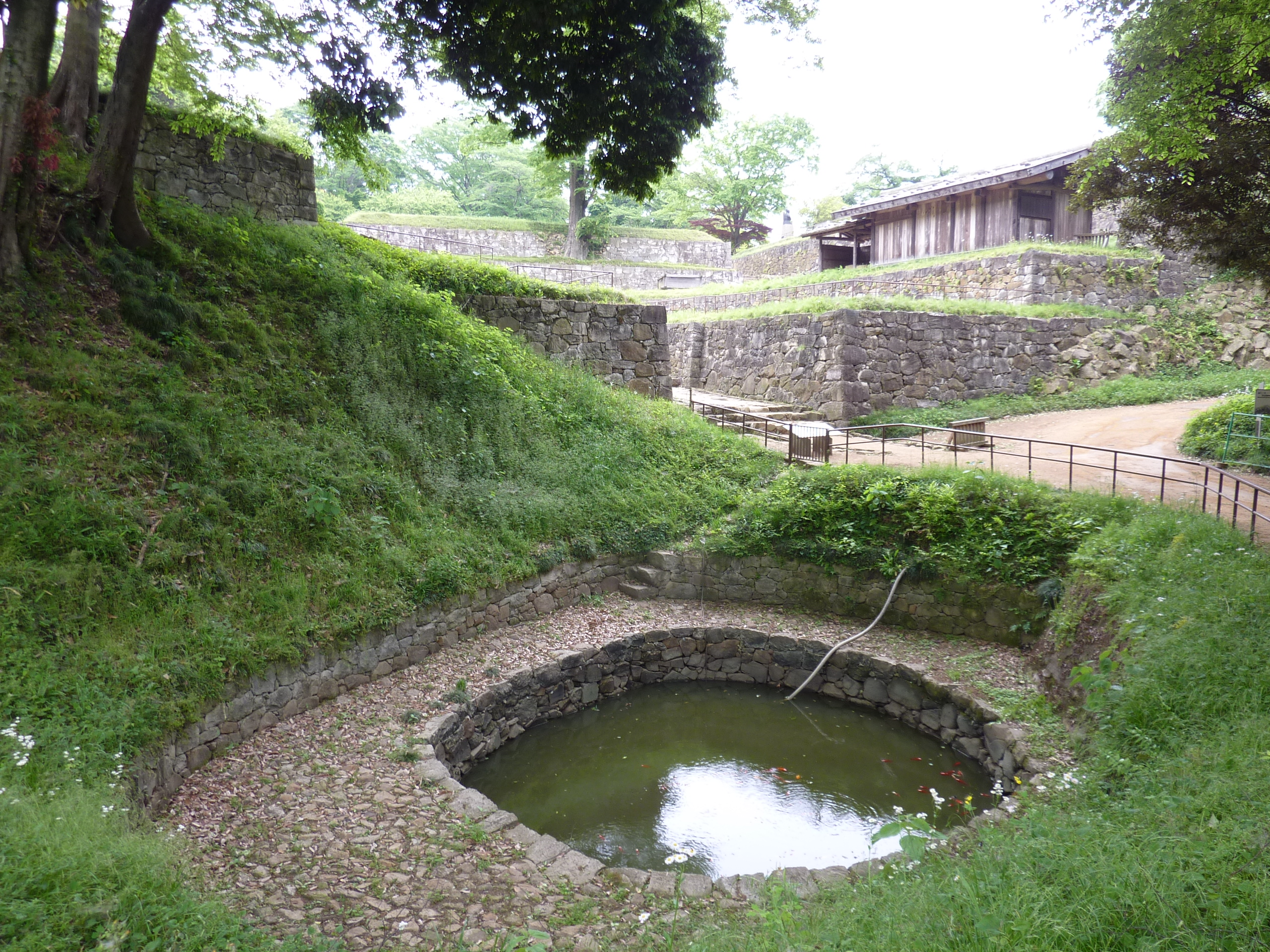
- Kanayama Castle ruins

Site information
- Type: hilltop-style Japanese castle
- Open to the public: yes
- Condition: ruins

Location
- Kanayama Castle Kanayama Castle (Japan)

Site history
- Built: 1469
- Built by: Iwamatsu clan
- In use: Sengoku period
- Demolished: 1591

Kanayama Castle (金山城, Kanayama-jō) was a Sengoku period yamashiro-style castle located on top of Mount Kanayama in what is now Ōta, Gunma Prefecture, Japan. The site has been protected as a National Historic Site since 1990. The castle was also known as Ōta Kanayama Castle or as Nitta Kanayama Castle.

== Background ==
Kanayama Castle is located on Mount Kanayama, a 200-meter-tall (660 ft) hill located to the north of central Ōta on the northern edge of the Kantō Plain, with two large rivers, the Tone River and Watarase River on either side. The location is a strategic point commanding the corridor from the eastern provinces to the northwest Kantō region.

== History ==
Kanayama Castle was built in 1469 by the Iwamatsu clan, local warlords of the area. In 1528, one of their retainers, Yokose Narishige, (his family later changed their name to Yura), seized the castle and overthrew his overlord. The Yura clan expanded their influence in rapidly in Kōzuke Province seizing Kiryū Castle, Ashikaga Castle and Tatebayashi Castle, and rebuilding Kanayama Castle on a large scale. However, the Yura clan was hemmed in by much more powerful neighbors, especially the Uesugi clan to the north and the Hōjō clan to the south. Initially, the Yura pledged fealty to Uesugi Kenshin, but in 1566 changed their allegiance to the Hōjō. An outraged Kenshin ordered the Satake clan to attack Kanayama in 1574, and participated in the siege himself, but Kanayama Castle withstood the attack. The castle was unsuccessfully attacked again by Takeda Katsuyori in 1580, and Satake Yoshishige in 1583.

In 1584, when Yura Kunishige and his brother Nagao Akinaga, the leaders of the Yura clan, visited Odawara Castle to pay their respects to the Hōjō clan, they were seized in an act of treachery as the Hōjō armies launched a surprise attack against Kanayama. The castle was defended by their mother, Akai Teruko, who at the age of 71, commanded the defenses at the Battle of Kanayama Castle. She led her 3,000 remaining soldiers and resisted over 15 months, and finally surrendered under the condition at the returner captured sons. Kanayama Castle remained in Hōjō hands only a couple of years before it was captured by Maeda Toshiie in 1590 as part of the larger Battle of Odawara in which Toyotomi Hideyoshi destroyed the Hōjō clan. Afterwards, it was never used again and fell into ruins. The castle's ruins (which have partly been restored) are currently maintained by the city of Ōta, and there is a local museum at site.

The castle was listed as one of Japan's Top 100 Castles by the Japan Castle Foundation in 2006.

== Design ==
As was typical for Japanese castles during this period, the castle spread across the hilltop with several enclosures fortified by clay ramparts and dry moats, with the inner bailey located at the highest location. A small valley below the inner bailey was fortified by stone walls and was used as the main gate and was the site of the primary residence of the Yura lords. A round pond still remaining in this location is a surviving remnant of a Japanese garden that once occupied this site. The secondary enclosures are connected by gates with stone walls and the extensive use of stone walls was unusual for the location and period in which the castle was built. The size of the main area was roughly one kilometer in length, and the total area with secondary fortifications covered some three square kilometers.

It was long believed that the tenshu (keep) of Kanayama Castle was moved to Inuyama Castle by Ishikawa Mitsuyoshi in 1559. This theory was disproved by archeological examinations undertaken during restoration works carried out between 1961 and 1965, which involved the dismantling of the Inuyama Castle's tenshu.

== See also ==
- List of Historic Sites of Japan (Gunma)

== Literature ==
- Schmorleitz, Morton S. (1974). Castles in Japan. Tokyo: Charles E. Tuttle Co. pp. 144–145. ISBN 0-8048-1102-4.
- De Lange, William (2021). An Encyclopedia of Japanese Castles. Groningen: Toyo Press. p. 600. ISBN 978-9492722300.
- Motoo, Hinago (1986). Japanese Castles. Tokyo: Kodansha. p. 200 pages. ISBN 0-87011-766-1.
- Mitchelhill, Jennifer (2004). Castles of the Samurai: Power and Beauty. Tokyo: Kodansha. p. 112 pages. ISBN 4-7700-2954-3.
- Turnbull, Stephen (2003). Japanese Castles 1540-1640. Osprey Publishing. p. 64 pages. ISBN 1-84176-429-9.
