= Isono Tamba-no-kami =

Isono Tamba.

Isono Tamba (磯野丹波) was an officer of Azai Nagamasa during the Sengoku Period in Japan. Tamba was lord of Sawayama Castle in Omi Province and a retainer of the Azai clan. He fought at the Battle of Maibara in 1561 infamously distinguishing himself as the one who accidentally attacked his comrade Imai Kenroku.

Later on, he served under the Azai clan. At the Battle of Anegawa in 1570, he fought against Oda Nobunaga.
