= Microsoft Automatic Graph Layout =

Software library

Microsoft Automatic Graph Layout (MSAGL)
- Original authors: Lev Nachmanson, Sergey Pupyrev, Tim Dwyer, Ted Hart, Roman Prutkin
- Developer: Microsoft Research
- Initial release: February 26, 2015; 10 years ago
- Stable release: v1.1 / January 28, 2022; 3 years ago
- Repository: github.com/Microsoft/automatic-graph-layout
- Written in: C#
- Operating system: Microsoft Windows
- Platform: .NET Framework
- Type: Software framework
- License: MIT License
- Website: research.microsoft.com/en-us/projects/msagl/

Microsoft Automatic Graph Layout (MSAGL) is a .NET library for automatic graph layout. It was created by Lev Nachmanson at Microsoft Research.

Earlier versions carried the name GLEE (Graph Layout Execution Engine).

== Contents ==
The MSAGL software supplies four programming libraries:

- Microsoft.MSAGL.dll, a device-independent graph layout engine;
- Microsoft.MSAGL.Drawing.dll, a device-independent implementation of graphs as graphical user interface objects, with all kinds of graphical attributes, and support for interface events such as mouse actions;
- Microsoft.MSAGL.GraphViewerGDI.dll, a Windows.Forms-based graph viewer control.
- Microsoft.MSAGL.WpfGraphControl.dll, a WPF (Windows Presentation Foundation) based graph viewer control.

A trivial application is supplied to demonstrate the viewer.

== Features ==
MSAGL performs layout based on "principles of the Sugiyama scheme; it produces so called layered, or hierarchical, layouts" (according to the MSAGL home page). A modified Coffman–Graham scheduling algorithm is then used to find a layout that would fit in a given space. More detailed description of the algorithm can be found in U.S. patent 7,932,907.

At some time, it did not support a wide range of different layout algorithms, unlike, for instance, GraphViz or GUESS.

It does not appear to support incremental layout.

== Availability and licensing ==
MSAGL is distributed under MIT License as open source at GitHub.

== See also ==
- graph layout
- Graph algorithms
- Graphviz, an open-source graph drawing system from AT&T
