= Sawayama Castle =

Historical Japanese castle

Coordinates: 35°16′46.2″N 136°16′8.13″E

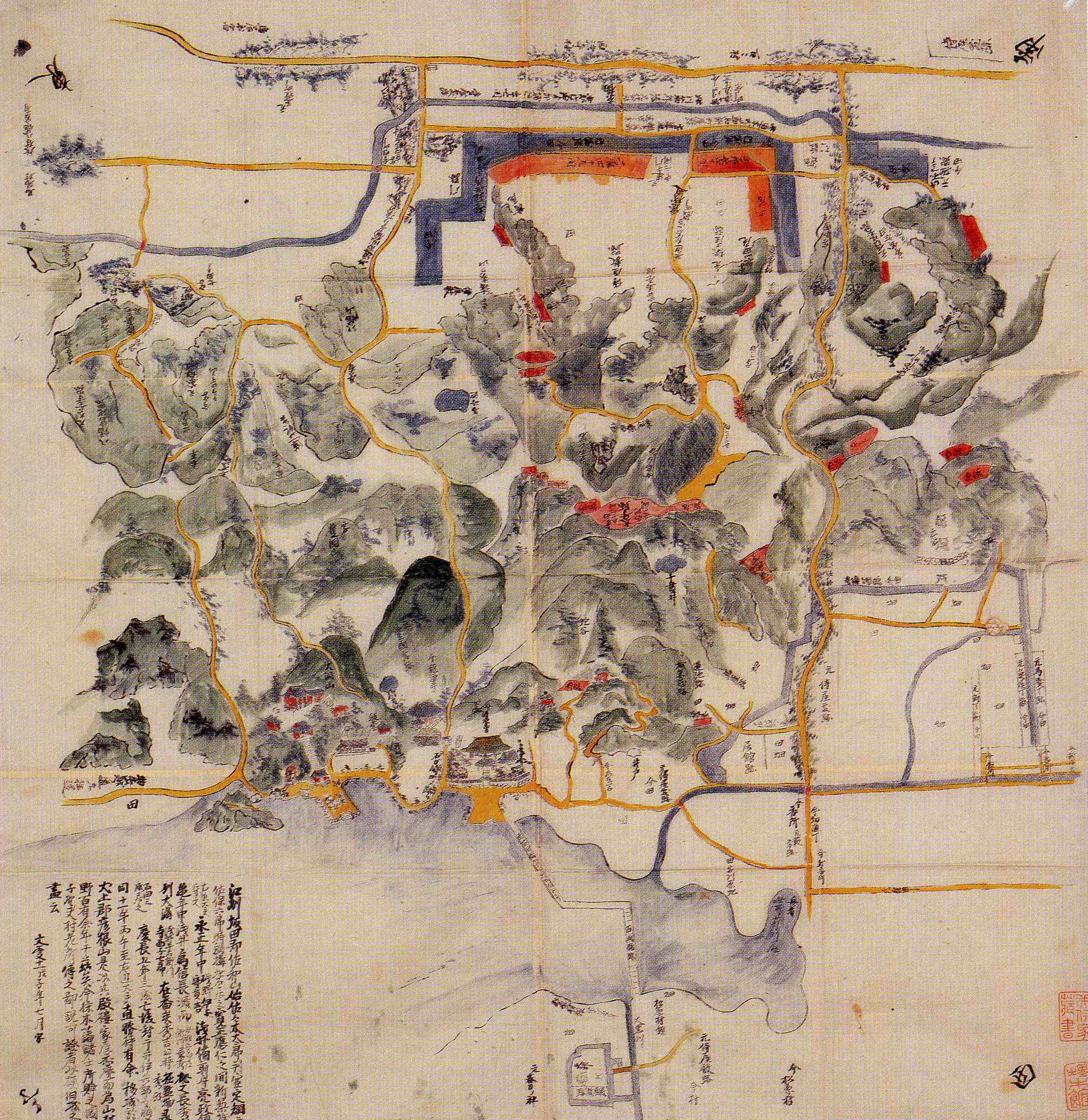
Sawayama castle map

Sawayama Castle (佐和山城, Sawayama-jō) was a castle in the city of Hikone, Shiga Prefecture, Japan. This castle was an important military stronghold of Ōmi Province. The Azai clan held this castle in the Sengoku Period. Niwa Nagahide held it after the ruin of the Azai clan and later, Ishida Mitsunari in the end of the 16th century.

This castle was attacked by Kobayakawa Hideaki after the Battle of Sekigahara. The castle surrendered at half a day though the brother of Mitsunari, Ishida Masazumi and his father Ishida Masatsugu, defended it. Afterwards, Ii Naomasa occupied Sawayama Castle. However, he destroyed it, and moved to Hikone Castle. Much of Sawayama Castle's stone walls and buildings were carried away for use in Hikone Castle. At present, the only indication of this old history is a sign reading "The Site of Sawayama Castle."

There is also a hiking course that leads to the summit of Mount Sawayama, from which hikers see a panoramic view that includes Hikone Castle and Lake Biwa.

== Notable people ==
- Isono Tamba-no-kami, an officer of Azai Nagamasa

== Gallery ==
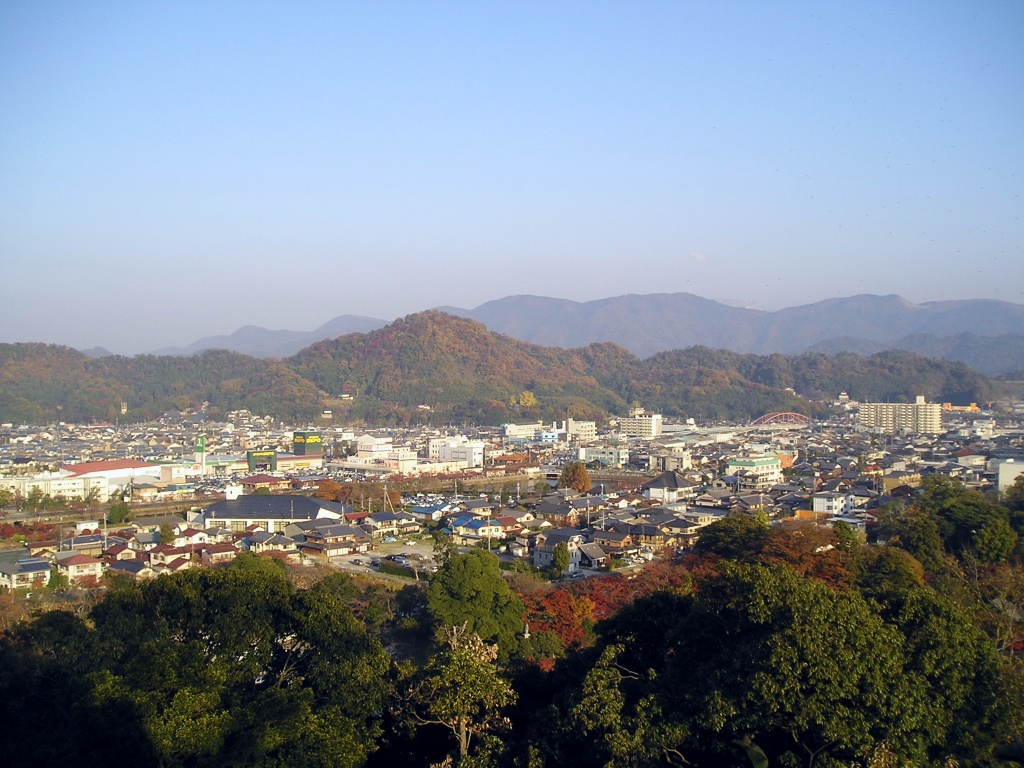
Mt Sawa seen from Hikone Castle

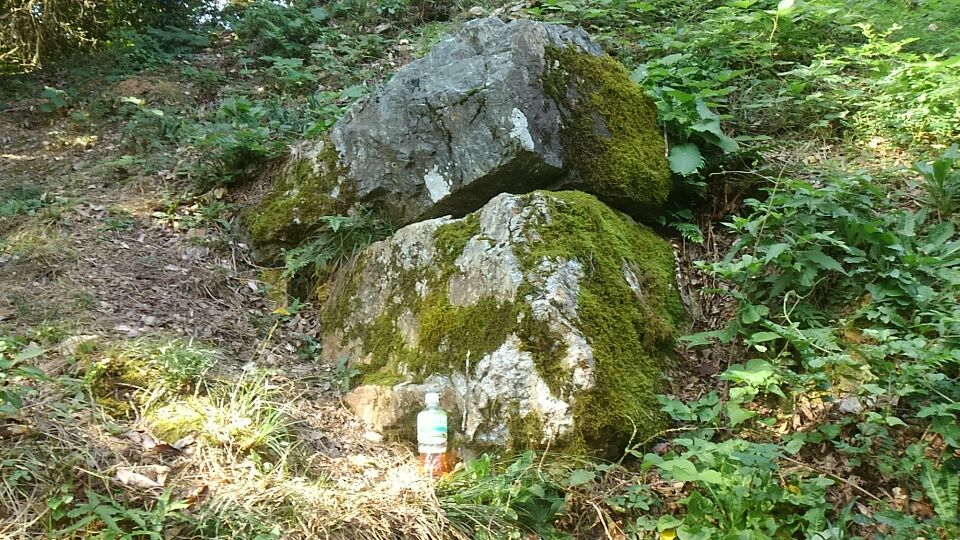
Stone wall

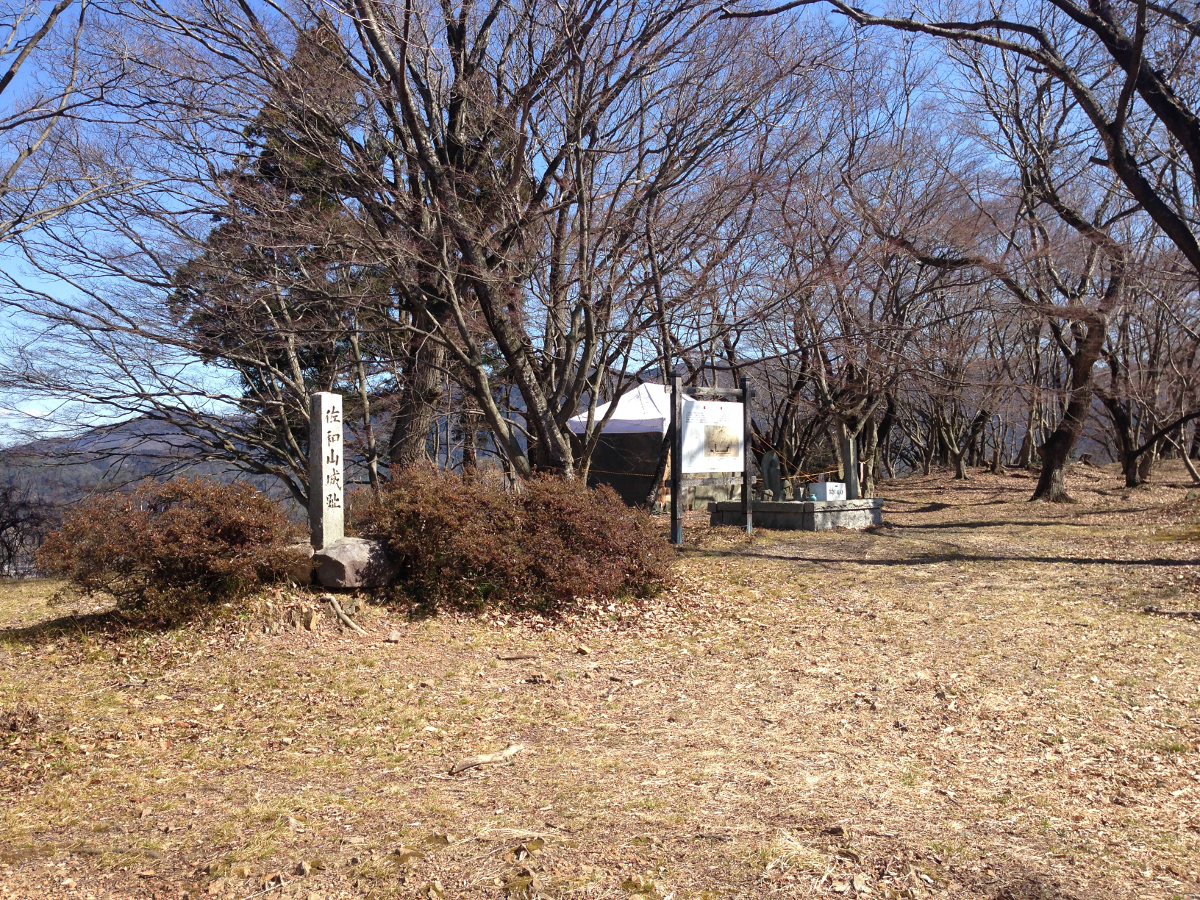
Honmaru Base

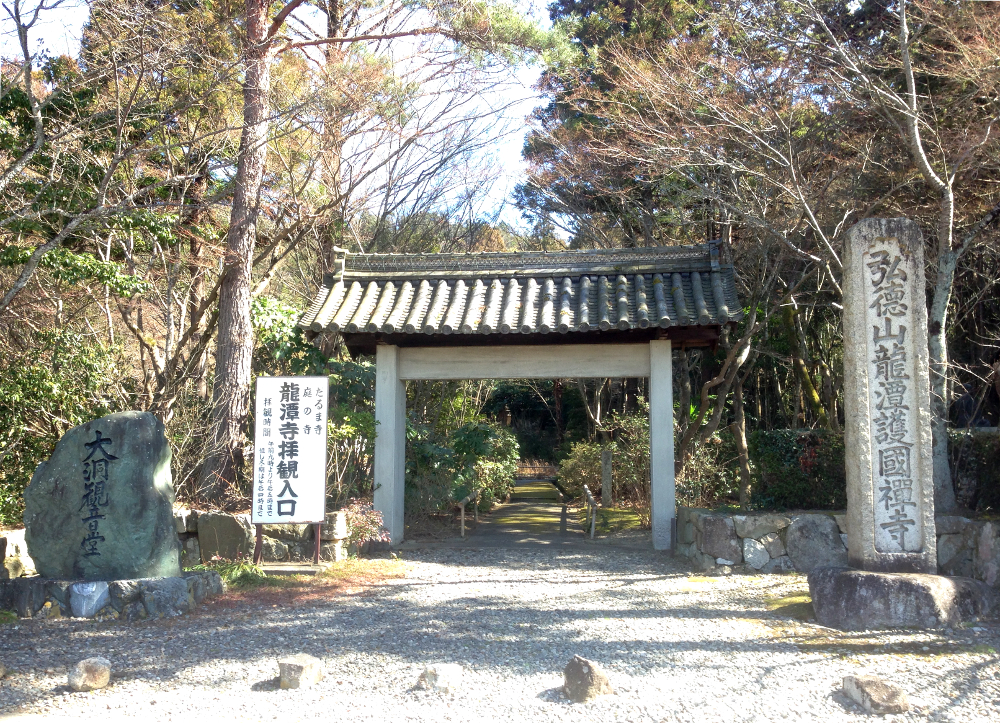
In front of Ryutan-ji Temple, which is the entrance to the mountain trail to the castle

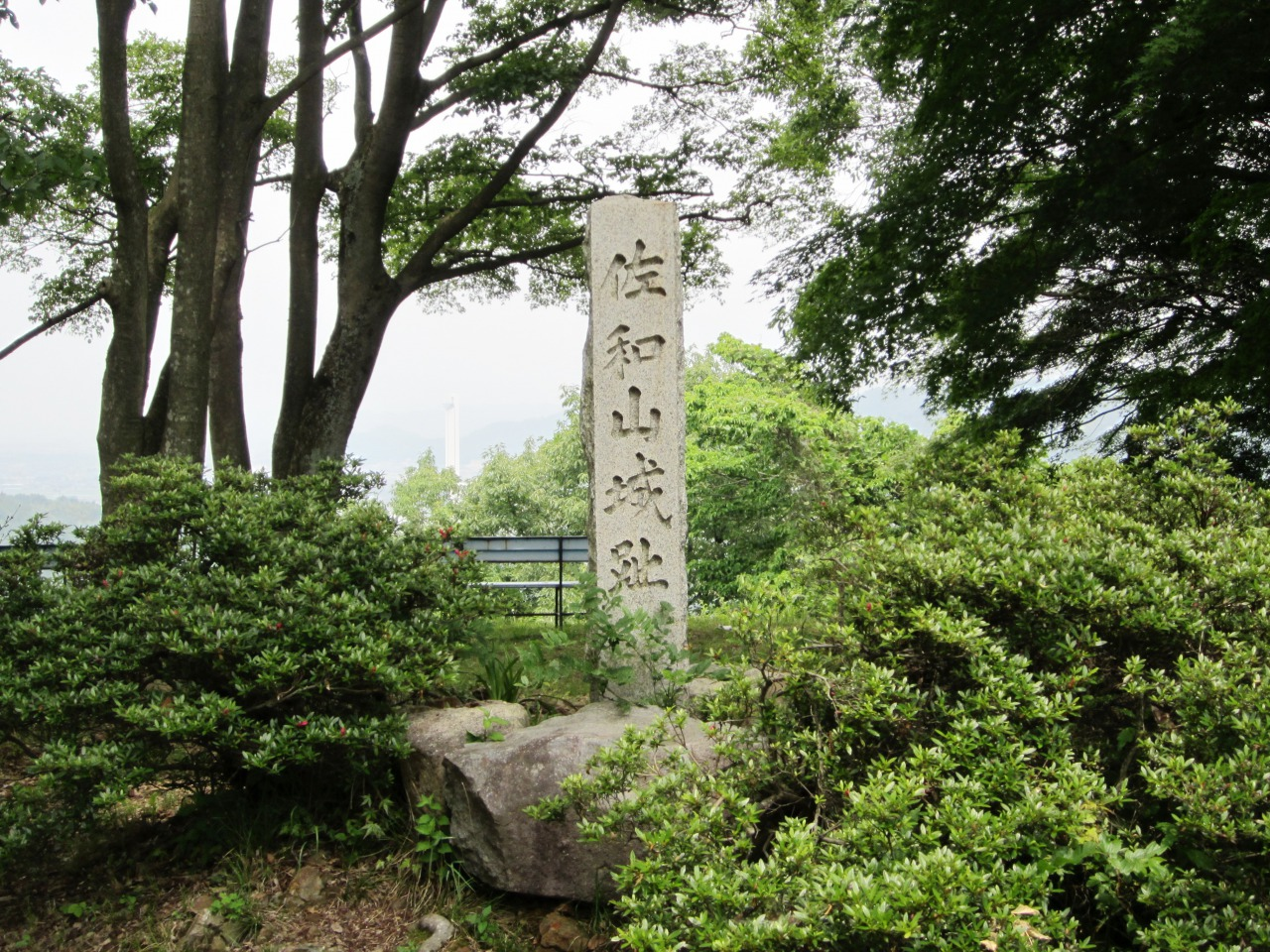
Sawayama Castle Ruins

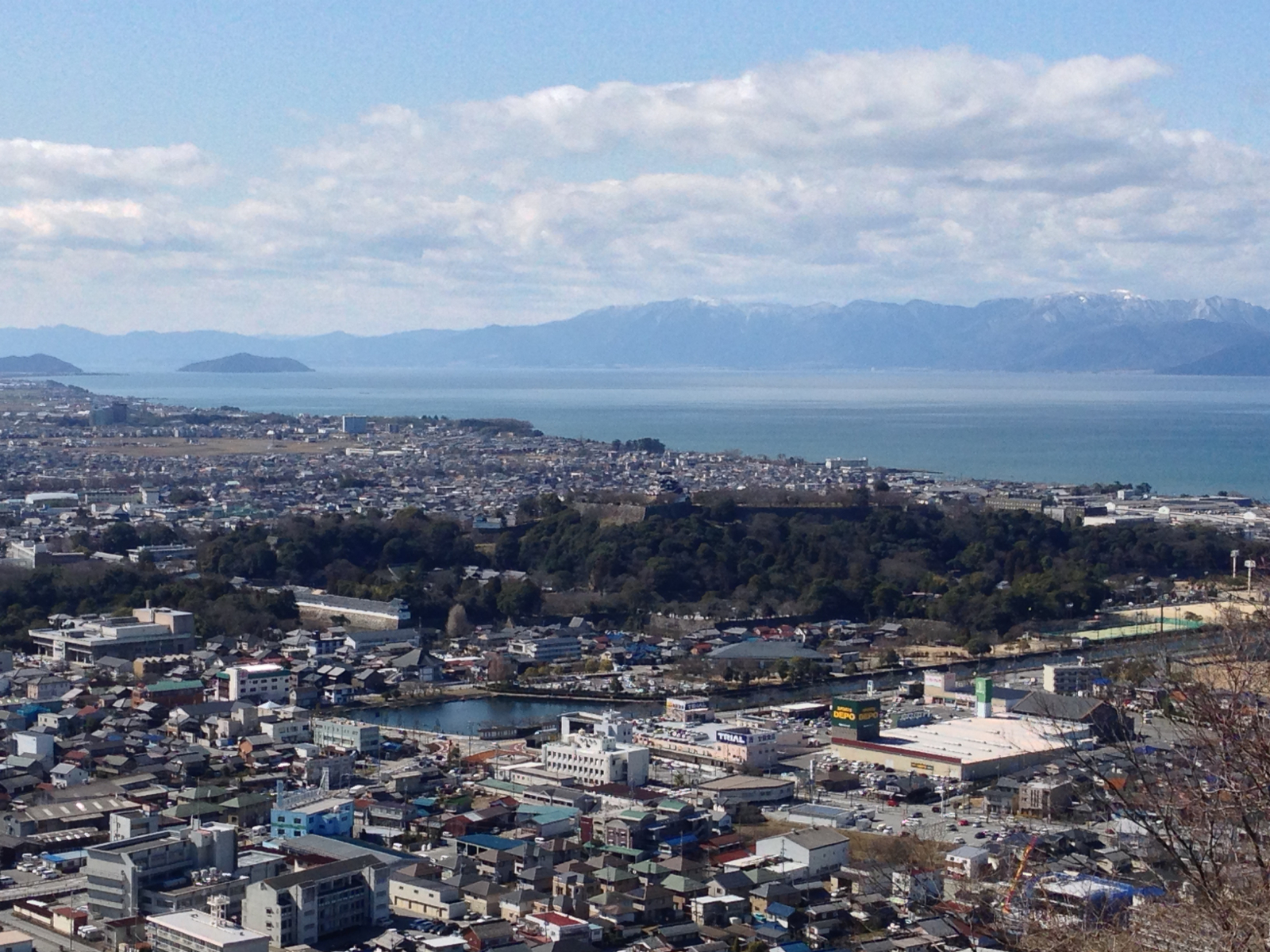
Hikone Castle overlooking Sawayama Castle Honmaruto
