= Ishida Masatsugu =

Japanese samurai

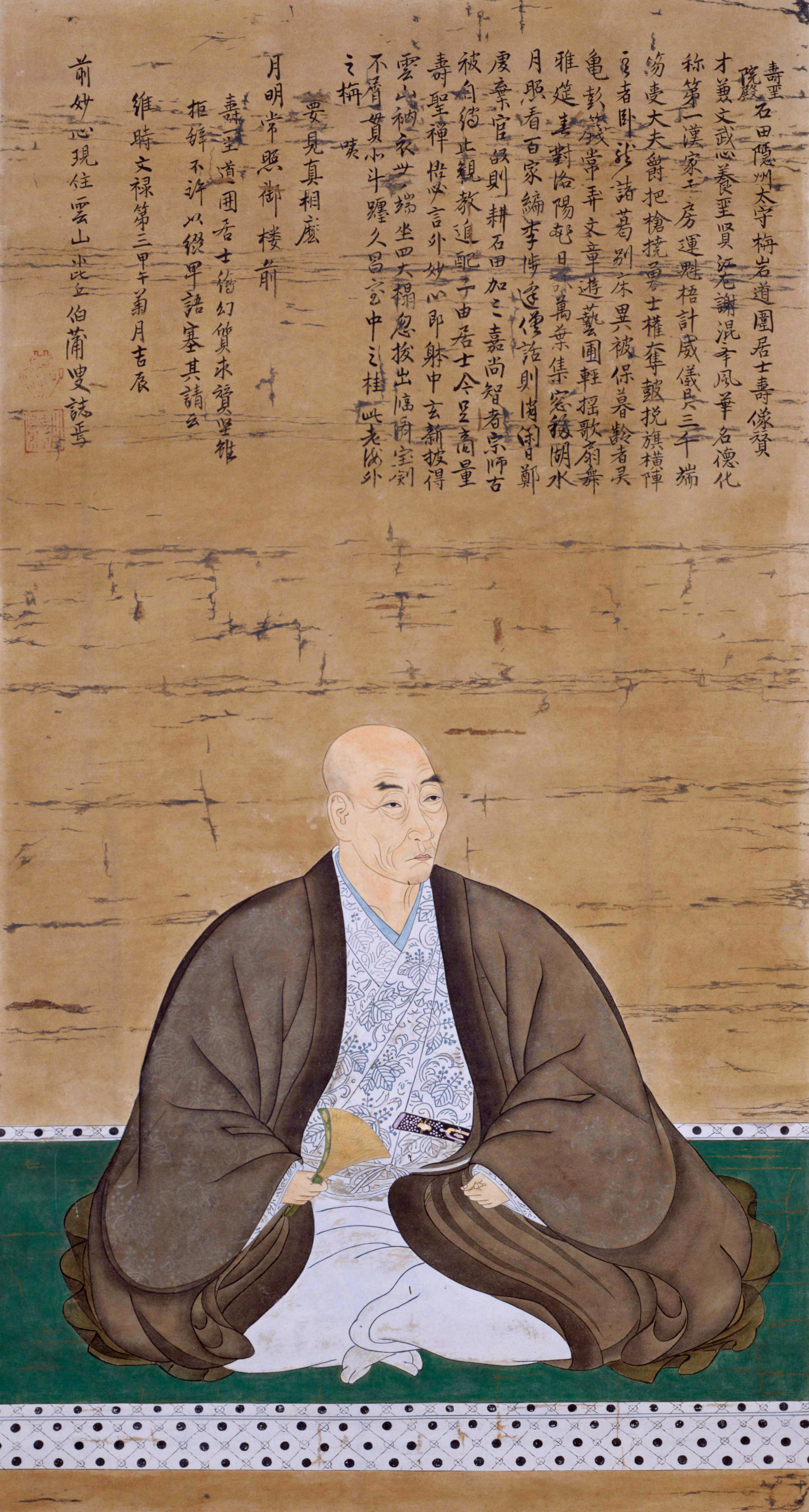
Ishida Masatsugu

Ishida Masatsugu (石田 正継; ? – October 23, 1600) was a Japanese samurai of the late Sengoku period who served the Azai clan and held Ishida castle in Omi province. He was the son of Ishida Seishin. He was the father of Ishida Mitsunari. After the Battle of Sekigahara in 1600, he and his other son, Masazumi, committed suicide at Mitsunari's Sawayama Castle in Omi province.

== Bibliography ==
- Samurai Wiki
