= Ishida Shigenari =

Japanese samurai

Ishida Shigenari (石田 重成; 1589 – 1641?) was a Japanese samurai of the early Edo era. He was also known as Sugiyama Gengo (杉山 源吾). The son of Ishida Mitsunari, Shigenari served as a retainer of the Tsugaru clan of Hirosaki.
