= Kozo Sugiyama =

Japanese computer scientist

- Born: September 17, 1945; Gifu Prefecture, Japan
- Died: June 10, 2011 (aged 65)
- Education: Nagoya University
- Scientific career
- Fields: Computer science
- Workplaces: Japan Advanced Institute of Science and Technology

Kozo Sugiyama (杉山 公造, Sugiyama Kōzō; September 17, 1945 – June 10, 2011) was a Japanese computer scientist and graph drawing researcher.

== Biography ==
Sugiyama was born on September 17, 1945, in Gifu Prefecture, Japan. He did both his undergraduate and graduate studies at Nagoya University, earning a doctorate in 1974. He then worked for Fujitsu until 1997, when he became a professor at the Japan Advanced Institute of Science and Technology. At JAIST, he became a center director in 1998, dean in 2000, and vice president in 2008. He died on June 10, 2011.

In the 1990s, Sugiyama also served as one of the directors of the Information Processing Society of Japan.

== Research ==
Sugiyama is best known for his work with Tagawa and Toda introducing layered graph drawing, now also known as Sugiyama-style graph drawing. Sugiyama also wrote highly cited papers on other topics in graph drawing including maintenance of the "mental map" when a drawing is modified, drawings that simultaneously display both the adjacencies between vertices in a graph and a hierarchical structure on the same vertices, and the control of edge orientations in force-based algorithms.

== Books ==
Sugiyama was the author of several books on graph drawing and knowledge engineering. His book Graph drawing and applications for software and knowledge engineers (World Scientific, Series on Software Engineering and Knowledge Engineering, Vol. 11, 2002, ISBN 978-981-02-4879-6) is a translation into English of a 1992 Japanese book that was the first book in any language on the subject of graph drawing. His book Knowledge Science (with Atsushi Shimojima and Akiya Nagata) was also translated into Korean (BADA Publishing, 2005).
