= Aoki =

Aoki (青木, literally "green/blue tree") may refer to:

== People ==
- Aoki (surname), a list of people with the surname

== Places ==
- Aoki, Nagano, a village in the Nagano Prefecture

== Company ==
- Aoki Corporation, a defunct construction company

== Fictional characters ==
- Aoki, railroad engineer of Hikari 109 in The Bullet Train
- Daisuke Aoki, the male lead character of Kodomo no Jikan
- Junko Aoki, a character of Crossfire
- Seiichiro Aoki, one of the Dragons of Heaven from X/1999
- Larry (Pokémon) (known as Aoki (アオキ) in Japan), Pokémon Gym Leader and Elite Four member in Pokémon Scarlet and Pokémon Violet.
