= Shigeru =

- Gender: Male

Origin
- Origin: Japanese
- Meaning: Different meanings depending on the kanji used

Shigeru (written: 茂, 繁, 滋, しげる in hiragana or シゲル in katakana) is a masculine Japanese given name. Notable people with the name include:

- Shigeru Aburaya (油谷 繁; born 1977), Japanese long-distance runner
- Shigeru Akabane (赤羽 茂; 1941–2011), Japanese professional midget wrestler
- Shigeru Amachi (天知 茂; 1931–1985), Japanese actor
- Shigeru Aoki (青木 繁; 1882–1911), Japanese painter
- Shigeru Aoyama (青山 繁; born 1969), Japanese former volleyball player
- Shigeru Baba (馬場 滋; born 1948), Japanese professional Go player
- Shigeru Ban (坂 茂; born 1957), Japanese architect
- Shigeru Chiba (千葉 繁; born 1954), Japanese voice actor
- Shigeru Chiba (baseball) (千葉 茂; 1919–2002), Japanese baseball second baseman
- Shigeru Dōko (堂故 茂; born 1952), Japanese politician
- Shigeru Egami (江上 茂; 1912–1981), Japanese karateka
- Shigeru Endo (遠藤 茂; born 1945), Japanese sport wrestler
- Shigeru Fujita (藤田 茂; 1889–1980), Japanese career military officer and lieutenant general
- Shigeru Fukudome (福留 繁; 1891–1971), Japanese admiral and Chief
- Shigeru Honjō (本庄 繁; 1876–1945), Japanese general
- Shigeru Hori (保利 茂; 1901–1979), Japanese prominent politician
- Shigeru Iitaka (飯高 茂; born 1942), Japanese mathematician
- Shigeru Inoda (伊野田 繁; 1955–2008), Japanese ophthalmologist, surgeon and amateur astronomer
- Shigeru Ishiba (石破 茂; born 1957), Japanese politician
- Shigeru Ishimoto (石本 茂; 1913–2007), Japanese politician
- Shigeru Itō (伊藤茂; 1928–2016), Japanese socialist politician
- Shigeru Iwasaki (岩崎 茂; born 1953), Japanese military officer
- Shigeru Izumi (泉 茂; 1922–1995), Japanese painter and printmaker
- Shigeru Izumiya (泉谷 しげる; born 1948), Japanese actor and singer
- Shigeru Joshima (城島 茂; born 1970), Japanese musician, actor and agricultural entrepreneur
- Shigeru Kaga (加賀 繁; born 1985), Japanese professional baseball player
- Shigeru Kan-no (菅野 茂; born 1959), Japanese composer and conductor
- Shigeru Kasahara (笠原 茂; 1933-1990), Japanese lightweight freestyle wrestler
- Shigeru Kasamatsu (笠松 茂; born 1947), Japanese artistic gymnast
- Shigeru Katagiri (片桐 茂; 1892–1944), Japanese general
- Shigeru Kayano (萱野 茂; 1926–2006), Japanese Ainu activist
- Shigeru Kitamura (北村 滋; born 1956), Japanese police officer
- Shigeru Kitayama (北山 茂), Japanese anime producer
- Shigeru Kobayashi (小林 繁; 1952–2010), Japanese baseball player
- Shigeru Komatsubara (小松原 茂; born 1949), Japanese cinematographer
- Shigeru Konno (金野 滋; 1922–2007), Japanese rugby player
- Shigeru Kōyama (神山 繁; 1929–2017), Japanese actor
- Shigeru Kurihara (栗原 茂; born 1970), Japanese gymnast
- Shigeru Kuzuhara (葛原 しげる; 1886–1961), Japanese children's poet, children's song writer, fairy tale writer and educator
- Shigeru Makino (牧野 茂; 1928–1984), Japanese baseball shortstop, second baseman and coach
- Shigeru Matsuzaki (松崎 しげる; born 1949), Japanese singer and actor
- Shigeru Miyagawa (宮川 滋; born 1948), Japanese rower
- Shigeru Miyamoto (宮本 茂; born 1952), Japanese video game designer, producer, game director and filmmaker at Nintendo
- Shigeru Mizuhara (水原 茂; 1909–1982), Japanese former professional baseball infielder and manager
- Shigeru Mizuki (水木 しげる; 1922 – 2015), expert on yokai and creator of the popular manga series Ge Ge Ge no Kitaro, and others
- Shigeru Mogi (茂木 滋; born 1973), Japanese voice actor
- Shigeru Morikasa (森笠 繁; born 1976), Japanese baseball player
- Shigeru Morioka (森岡 茂; born 1973), Japanese former football player
- Shigeru Morita (森田茂; 1907–2009), Japanese painter
- Shigeru Mukai (向井 茂; born 1953), Japanese mathematician
- Shigeru Muroi (室井 滋; born 1958), Japanese actress
- Shigeru Nakahara (中原 茂; born 1961), Japanese voice actor
- Shigeru Nakajima (中島 重; 1888–1946), Japanese legal scholar, sociologist, and Christian thinker
- Shigeru Nakamura (renju player) (中村 茂; born 1959), Japanese renju player
- Shigeru Nakanishi (中西 繁; born 1946), Japanese artist
- Shigeru Nakayama (中山 茂; 1928–2014), Japanese historian of science
- Shigeru Nambara (南原 繁; 1889–1974), Japanese political scientist
- Shigeru Nanba (難波 滋; born 1944), Japanese painter and artist
- Shigeru Narahara (奈良原 繁; 1834–1918), Japanese politician
- Shigeru Nonaka (野仲 茂; born 1970), Japanese professional golfer
- Shigeru Oda (小田 滋; 1924–2025), Japanese jurist, judge on the International Court of Justice from 1976 to 2003
- Shigeru Ohmori (大森 滋; born 1980), Japanese video game director, designer, and developer
- Shigeru Okaizumi (岡泉 茂; born 1968), Japanese retired judoka
- Shigeru Omi (尾身 茂; born 1949), Japanese President of the Japan Community Health Care Organization
- Shigeru Onishi (大西 茂; 1928–1994), Japanese visual artist
- Shigeru Ota (太田 茂; born 1967), Japanese former professional tennis player
- Shigeru Oyama (大山 茂; 1936–2016), Japanese karateka
- Shigeru Saeki (佐伯 繁; born 1969), Japanese mixed martial arts promoter
- Shigeru Sahashi (佐橋 滋; 1913–1993), Japanese government official
- Shigeru Sakurai (桜井 繁; born 1979), Japanese former football player
- Shigeru Sawada (沢田 茂; 1887–1980), Japanese general
- Shigeru Shimada (島田 繁; born 1935), Japanese ice hockey player
- Shigeru Shirai (白井 滋; 1957–2020), Japanese ichthyologist
- Shigeru So (宗 茂; born 1953), Japanese retired long-distance runner
- Shigeru Sugimura (杉村 繁; born 1957), Japanese former Nippon Professional Baseball infielder
- Shigeru Sugishita (杉下 茂; 1925–2023), Japanese professional baseball pitcher and coach
- Shigeru Sugita (杉田 茂; 1947–2025), Japanese bodybuilding champion
- Shigeru Sugiura (杉浦 茂; 1908–2000), Japanese manga artist
- Shigeru Suzuki (鈴木 茂; born 1951), Japanese musician, songwriter and guitarist
- Shigeru Tagawa (田川 茂; born 1975), Japanese long jumper
- Shigeru Takada (高田 繁; born 1951), Japanese former general manager of the Yokohama DeNA BayStars
- Shigeru Takahashi (高橋 茂), Japanese football player
- Shigeru Takashina (1943–2013), Japanese karateka
- Shigeru Tamura (photographer) (田村 茂; 1909–1987), Japanese photographer
- Shigeru Tamura (illustrator) (田村 茂; born 1949), Japanese illustrator, animator, filmmaker and manga artist
- Shigeru Tonomura (外村 繁; 1902–1961), Japanese author
- Shigeru Tsuyuguchi (露口 茂; 1932–2025), Japanese actor
- Shigeru Uchida (golfer) (内田 繁; born 1937), Japanese professional golfer
- Shigeru Uchida (politician) (内田 茂; 1939–2022), Japanese politician
- Shigeru Ueda (上田 繁; born 1963), Japanese anime storyboard artist and director
- Shigeru Uehara (上原 繁; born 1947), Japanese automotive engineer
- Shigeru Umebayashi (梅林 茂; born 1951), Japanese film score composer
- Shigeru Ushiyama (牛山 茂; born 1952), Japanese actor and voice actor
- Shigeru Wakatsuki (若槻 繁; 1914 or 1915 – 1987), Japanese film producer and journalist
- Shigeru Yagi (八木 茂; born 1950), Japanese murderer, former hostess club owner and possible serial killer
- Shigeru Yokotani (横谷 繁; born 1987), Japanese footballer
- Shigeru Yoshida (吉田 茂; 1878–1967), Japanese diplomat and politician, Prime Minister
- Shigeru Yoshida (civil servant) (吉田 茂; 1885–1954), Japanese bureaucrat and politician

== Fictional characters ==
- Shigeru Akagi (赤木 しげる), from Akagi
- Shigeru Aoba (青葉 シゲル), a character from Neon Genesis Evangelion
- Emperor Shigeru, a character in the Ranger's Apprentice series by John Flanagan.
- Shigeru Jo (城 茂, Jō Shigeru), protagonist of Kamen Rider Stronger
- Shigeru Kanmuri (冠 茂), a character from Yakitate!! Japan
- Shigeru Okido (オーキド・シゲル), the Japanese name of Gary Oak, a Pokémon character (named after Shigeru Miyamoto)
- Otori Shigeru, a character in Lian Hearn's trilogy Tales of the Otori
- Shigeru Yahaba, a character from Haikyu!!
