= Ishida Mitsunari =

Politician in Sengoku Period (1559–1600)

- 石田 三成
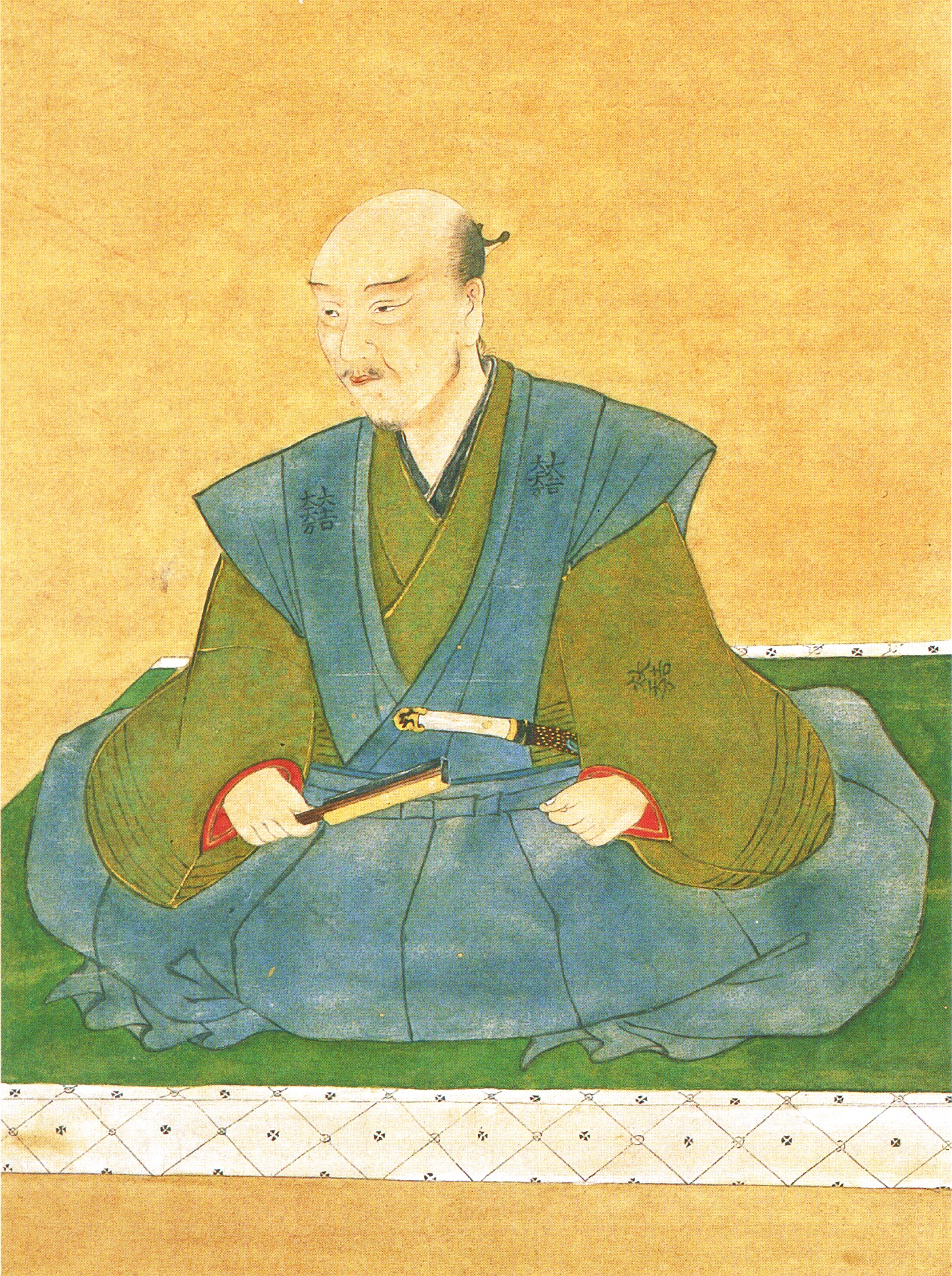

Daimyō of Sawayama Castle
- In office 1590–1600
- Succeeded by: Ii Naomasa

Personal details
- Born: Sakichi (佐吉); 1559 Ōmi Province (present-day Nagahama, Shiga Prefecture)
- Died: November 6, 1600 (aged 40–41) Kyoto
- Resting place: Sangen-in, Daitoku-ji, Kyoto
- Spouse: Kogetsu-in
- Children: Ishida Shigeie; Ishida Shigenari; Ishida Sakichi; Tatsuhime at least two other daughters
- Parents: Ishida Masatsugu (father); Unknown (mother)

Military service
- Allegiance: Azai clan Toyotomi clan Western Army
- Rank: Bugyō, Daimyō
- Commands: Sawayama Castle
- Battles/wars: Siege of Tottori; Siege of Takamatsu; Battle of Shizugatake; Battle of Komaki and Nagakute; Siege of Oshi; Korean Campaign; Siege of Fushimi; Battle of Sekigahara

Ishida Mitsunari (石田 三成; Japanese pronunciation: [i.ɕi.da (|) mʲi.tsɯꜜ.na.ɾʲi], 1559 – November 6, 1600) was a Japanese samurai and military commander of the late Sengoku period of Japan. He is probably best remembered as the commander of the Western army in the Battle of Sekigahara following the Azuchi–Momoyama period of the 16th century. He is also known by his court title, Jibu-no-shō (治部少輔).

== Biography ==
Mitsunari was born in 1559 in northern Ōmi Province (current Nagahama city, Shiga Prefecture), as the second son of Ishida Masatsugu, a retainer for the Azai clan. His childhood name was Sakichi (佐吉).

The Ishida withdrew from service after the Azai's defeat in 1573 at the Siege of Odani Castle. According to legend, Mitsunari was a monk in a Buddhist temple before serving Toyotomi Hideyoshi, but the accuracy of this legend is doubtful as it was first recorded during the Edo period.

In 1577, Mitsunari met Toyotomi Hideyoshi, when the former was still young and the latter was the daimyō of Nagahama. Later, Mitsunari became one of Hideyoshi’s samurai officers. When Hideyoshi engaged in a campaign in the Chūgoku region, Mitsunari assisted his lord in attacks against castles including Tottori Castle and Takamatsu Castle (in present-day Okayama).

In 1583, Mitsunari participated in the Battle of Shizugatake. According to the "Hitotsuyanagi Kaki", he was in charge of a mission to spy on Shibata Katsuie's army and also performed a great feat of Ichiban-yari (being the first to thrust a spear at an enemy soldier) as one of the warriors on the front line. Later, he served in the Battle of Komaki and Nagakute in 1584. That same year, he worked as a kenchi (survey magistrate) at Gamo county in Omi Province.

The emblem (mon) of Ishida Mitsunari

In 1585, Mitsunari was appointed as administrator of Sakai, a role he took together with his elder brother Ishida Masazumi. He was appointed one of the five bugyō, or top administrators of Hideyoshi's government, along with Asano Nagamasa, Maeda Gen'i, Mashita Nagamori and Natsuka Masaie. Hideyoshi made him a daimyō of Sawayama in Ōmi Province, a five hundred thousand koku fief (now a part of Hikone). Sawayama Castle was known as one of the best-fortified castles during that time. In January 1586, he hired Shima Sakon, who was renowned as a wise and courageous commander.

In 1588, Mitsunari was placed in charge of the famed "sword hunt" conducted by Hideyoshi in an effort to disarm the non-military bulk of the population and preserve peace.

In 1590, he campaigned against the Hōjō clan, where he commanded the Siege of Oshi and captured Oshi Castle.

In 1592, Mitsunari participated in the Japanese invasions of Korea as one of the Three Bureaucrats with Mashita Nagamori and Asano Nagamasa.

In 1597, Mitsunari was ordered by Hideyoshi to persecute Christians. However, he showed sympathy to Christianity by minimising the number of Christians he arrested, and trying hard to appease Hideyoshi's anger (see 26 Martyrs of Japan). In the same year, Mitsunari also reportedly worked to end the war with Korea and China.

=== Sekigahara Campaign and death ===
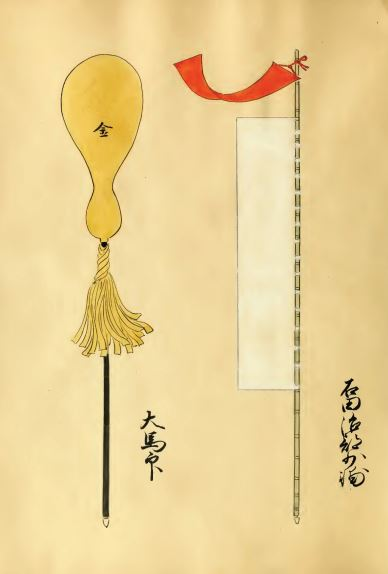
Ishida Mitsunari Banner and Battle Standard

After the death of Hideyoshi and the death of Maeda Toshiie in 1599, Mitsunari formed an alliance of Toyotomi loyalists to stand against Tokugawa Ieyasu. In mid 1600, Mitsunari besieged Fushimi Castle before marching into direct conflict with Tokugawa's alliance at Sekigahara. Since daimyo from across Japan were forced to side with either Ieyasu or Mitsunari (with the exception of the Toyotomi clan, which was the common overlord of both sides), the battle came to be known as the decisive battle that split the nation in two. On October 21, he and his allies were defeated at the Battle of Sekigahara. Mitsunari sought to escape but was caught by villagers. He was beheaded in Kyoto and his head publicly displayed. His remains were buried at Sangen-in, a sub-temple of the Daitoku-ji, Kyoto.

== Personal life ==
Mitsunari had three sons (Shigeie, Shigenari, and Sakichi) and three daughters (only the younger girl's name is known, Tatsuhime) with his wife. After his father's death, Shigenari changed his family name to Sugiyama to keep living.

Sawayama Castle was a castle which was controlled by the Ishida clan. When the castle captured by the Eastern army after the Sekigahara battle ended and after Mitsunari died, it was reported by a Tokugawa vassal named Itasaka Bokusai who entered the castle that there was not a single piece of gold or silver kept by Ishida Mitsunari there.

=== Mitsunari as military commander ===
According to Asano clan Documents, Mitsunari's popular reputation as a military commander suffered badly due to his alleged bad performance during the Siege of Oshi, particularly his failed strategy to flood the castle to force the defender to submit. (Note: 大日本古文書 浅野家文書』21号文書) However, other records based on documented correspondence during the operation have stated that the water flooding attack was actually an instruction from Toyotomi Hideyoshi himself, which was relayed by Asano Nagamasa and Kimura Shigekore. Mitsunari only executed the strategy and actually did not have freedom to devise his own initiatives.

Otani Yoshitsugu once rebuked Mitsunari from waging war against Ieyasu, citing the difference in the amount of Koku, the number of soldiers, and the amount of material resources between Ieyasu and Mitsunari, as well as the difference in military experience and ability, and said that there was no way Mitsunari could defeat Ieyasu.

Stephen Turnbull stated that traditional Japanese historiography did not pay much attention to Mitsunari's legacy, as he lost and Tokugawa won; he was often portrayed as a weak bureaucrat. His reputation has somewhat recovered since then, with later historians note his skill in planning and earlier battlefield victories, and that Sekigahara could easily have gone his way had a few more lords remained loyal.

=== Conflict with military faction ===
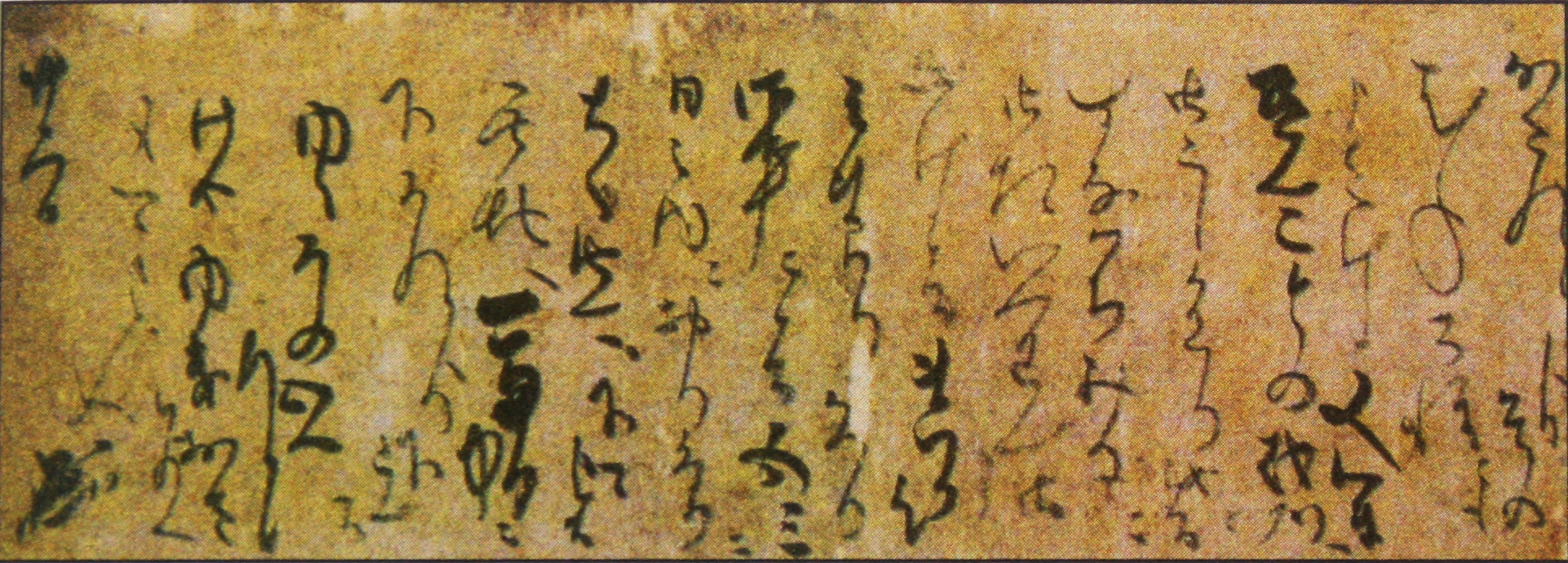
Ishida Mitsunari's letter to Toyotomi Hideyoshi, expressing a negative opinion of some generals' (including Kobayakawa Hideaki) reckless action during the Japanese invasions of Korea.

According to popular theory, in 1598, after the death of Toyotomi Hideyoshi, the government of Japan had an accident when seven military generals consisted of Fukushima Masanori, Katō Kiyomasa, Ikeda Terumasa, Hosokawa Tadaoki, Asano Yoshinaga, Katō Yoshiaki, and Kuroda Nagamasa planned a conspiracy to kill Ishida Mitsunari. However, despite the traditional depiction of the event as "seven generals against Mitsunari", modern historian Watanabe Daimon has pointed out that actually there were more generals involved in conflict against Mitsunari, such as Hachisuka Iemasa, Tōdō Takatora, and Kuroda Yoshitaka who also brought their troops and entourage to confront Mitsunari.

It reported reasons for this conspiracy was the dissatisfaction of those generals towards Mitsunari, caused because he wrote poor assessments and underreported their achievements during the Japanese invasions of Korea. Some, such as Tadaoki, also accused Mitsunari of other mismanagement during his tenure under Hideyoshi. At first, these generals gathered at Kiyomasa's mansion in Osaka Castle, and from there they marched to Mitsunari's mansion. However, Mitsunari had learned of this from a report by a servant of Toyotomi Hideyori named Jiemon Kuwajima, and fled to Satake Yoshinobu's mansion together with Shima Sakon and others to hide. When the seven generals found out that Mitsunari was not in his mansion, they searched the mansions of various feudal lords in Osaka Castle, and Kato's army also approached the Satake residence. Mitsunari and his party escaped from the Satake residence and barricaded themselves at Fushimi Castle. The next day, the seven generals surrounded Fushimi Castle with their soldiers as they knew Mitsunari was hiding there. Tokugawa Ieyasu, who was in charge of political affairs in Fushimi Castle attempted to arbitrate the situation. The seven generals requested that Ieyasu hand over Mitsunari, but Ieyasu refused. Ieyasu then negotiated a promise to let Mitsunari retire and to review the assessment of the Battle of Ulsan Castle in Korea which had been a major source of this incident. He also had his second son, Yūki Hideyasu, escort Mitsunari to Sawayama Castle.

However, historians like Daimon, Junji Mitsunari, and Goki Mizuno have pointed out that the primary and secondary sources text about the incident suggest that it was more of a legal conflict between those generals and Mitsunari, rather than a conspiracy to assassinate him. Under this theory, Ieyasu’s role was not to physically protect Mitsunari from physical harm, but rather to mediate the legal complaints from the military faction figures against Mitsunari. Considering these facts, a more proper term to describe this incident is "the military generals' lawsuit against Mitsunari", rather than "Seven generals' conspiracy to kill Mitsunari".

Nevertheless, historians viewed this incident not just as simply personal problems between those generals and Mitsunari, but rather as an extension of the political rivalries of greater scope between the Tokugawa faction and the anti-Tokugawa faction led by Mitsunari. After this incident, those military figures on bad terms with Mitsunari would later support Ieyasu during the conflict of Sekigahara. According to the Keicho Kenbunsho, on the eve of the Battle of Sekigahara, even his close ally Otani Yoshitsugu warned Mitsunari, saying, "You are hated by the daimyos, so if you raise an army, those who sued you last year will become your enemies.". Muramatsu Shunkichi, writer of "The Surprising Colors and Desires of the Heroes of Japanese History and violent women", gave his assessment that the reason of Mitsunari failed in his war against Ieyasu was due to his unpopularity among the major political figures of that time.

=== Political rivalry with Ieyasu ===
For a long time, the prevailing opinion about the cause of the Sekigahara war between Mitsunari and Ieyasu was that it was caused by the enmity between them. However, this view was challenged by Tonooka Shin'ichirō, a professor at Nara University and director of the Tsuruga City museum, as Shin'ichirō viewed the political maneuvers which led to the conflict in Sekigahara as being solely based on Mitsunari's motivation to regain his political position after the coup of military factions which stripped him of his position and had nothing to do with Ieyasu at personal level.

== Legacy ==
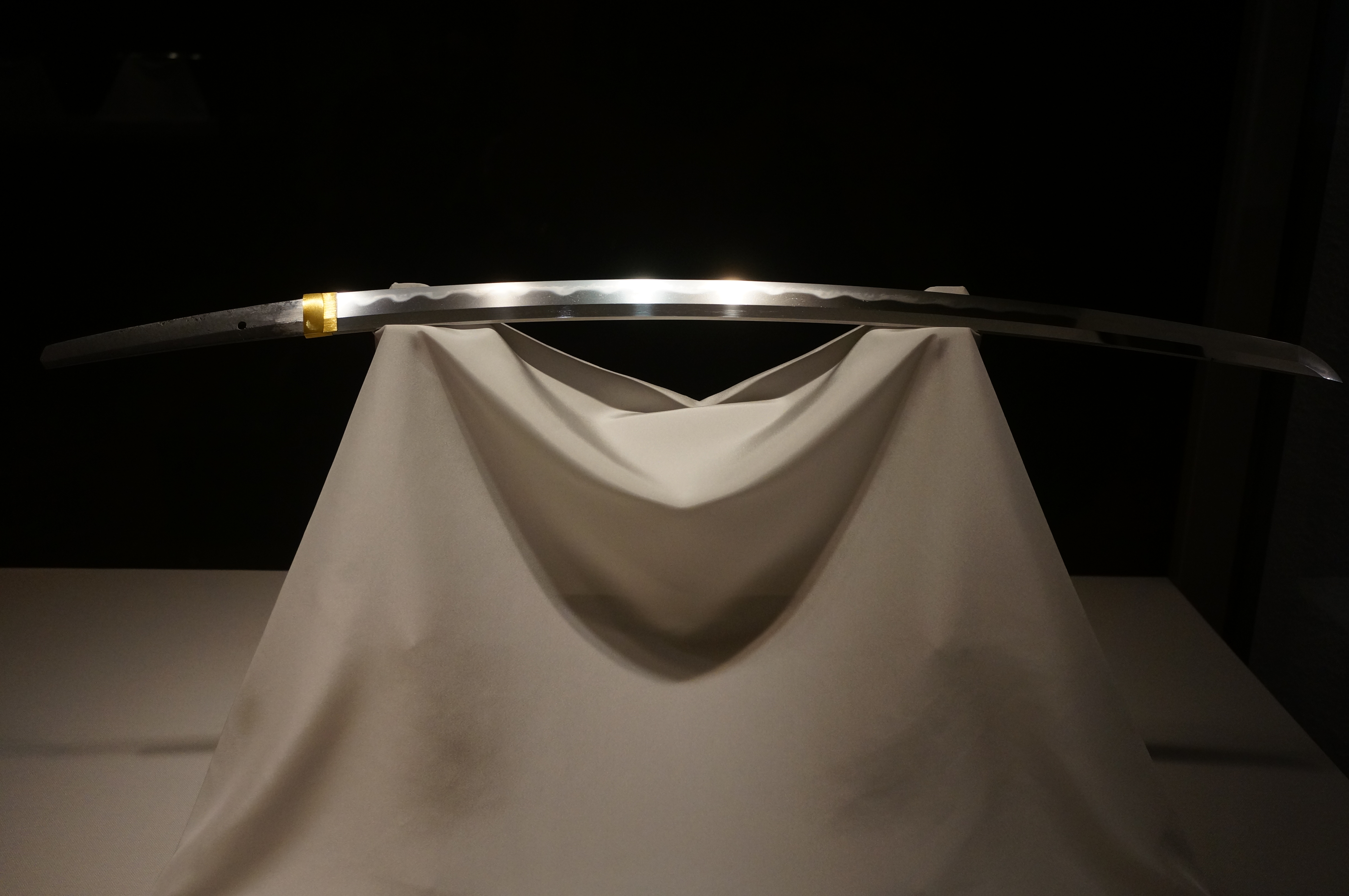
The "Ishida Masamune". Made by the legendary blacksmith Masamune.

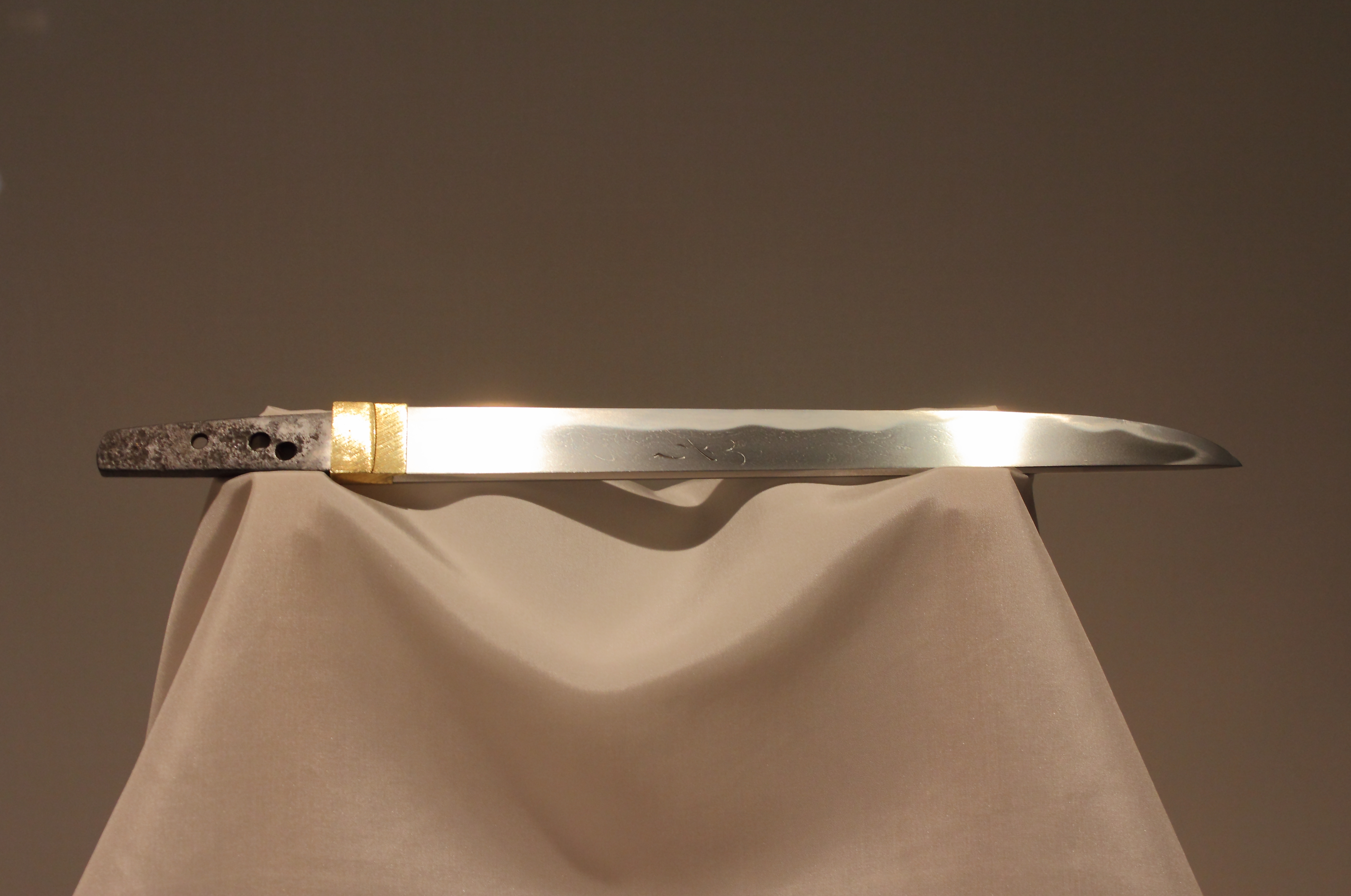
Tantō Masamune

On May 19, 1907, a group of Japanese researchers planned an excavation of Mitsunari's grave with the cooperation of a local newspaper. This was meant to aid Sesuke Watanabe from Tokyo Imperial University, who was writing a biography on Mitsunari. The one who led and examined the remains of Mitsunari was archaeologist Buntarō Adachi. Adachi restored Mitsunari's damaged skull, made a plaster cast, and recorded measurements of his upper arm bone and other bones. In 1943, a student of Adachi, Kenji Seino took further investigation, relying on photographs of Mitsunari's remains to conduct interviews with Adachi. When Seino completed his investigation, he discovered that Mitsunari's head was long from front to back and he had crooked teeth, and it was estimated that Mitsunari's age at the time of his death was about 41. Furthermore, Seino had reported his finding that based on the skeleton, it was difficult to distinguish the skeleton's gender. Seino also reported that the height of Mitsunari was estimated to be 156 centimeters. After the investigation, a plaster statue and other specimens of Mitsunari were preserved at Kyoto Imperial University, and his remains were reburied.

The katana nicknamed Ishida Masamune, made by the master swordsmith Masamune, was formerly owned by Ishida Mitsunari. It is an Important Cultural Property according to the Agency for Cultural Affairs, and is held in the Tokyo National Museum.

The Tantō "Hyūga Masamune", also made by Masamune, was also in the possession of Ishida Mitsunari. He gave this sword to Fukuhara Nagatake [the husband of his younger sister]; the sword was taken by an Eastern army general named Mizuno Katsushige after the Western army was defeated at the battle of Sekigahara. It is a National Treasure of Japan, and is currently held in the Mitsui Memorial Museum.

=== Popular culture ===
- In James Clavell's novel Shōgun, the character of "Ishido" is based on the historical figure Ishida. In the 1980 TV mini-series adaptation, Ishido was portrayed by Nobuo Kaneko. The character is played by Takehiro Hira in the 2024 adaptation, Shōgun.

== Appendix ==
=== Bibliography ===
- Bryant, Anthony. Sekigahara 1600: The Final Struggle for Power. Praeger Publishers, 2005
- SengokuDaimyo.com The website of Samurai Author and Historian Anthony J. Bryant
- SamuraiArchives.com
