= Shigeru Uchida (politician) =

Japanese politician (1939–2022)

Chairman of the Tokyo Metropolitan Assembly
- In office 2003–2005
- Preceded by: Toshiya Mita
- Succeeded by: Chuichi Kawashima

Personal details
- Born: 15 March 1939 Chiyoda City, Tokyo, Japan
- Died: 21 December 2022 (aged 83) Tokyo, Japan
- Party: LDP

Shigeru Uchida (Japanese: 内田茂 Uchida Shigeru; 15 March 1939 – 21 December 2022) was a Japanese politician. A member of the Liberal Democratic Party, he served as chairman of the Tokyo Metropolitan Assembly from 2003 to 2005.

Uchida died in Tokyo on 21 December 2022, at the age of 83.
