= Tatebayashi Castle =

Japanese castle in Tatebayashi, Gunma Prefecture, Japan

Coordinates: 36°14′39.25″N 139°32′28.8″E

Tatebeyashi Castle 館林城
- Tatebayashi, Gunma Prefecture, Japan
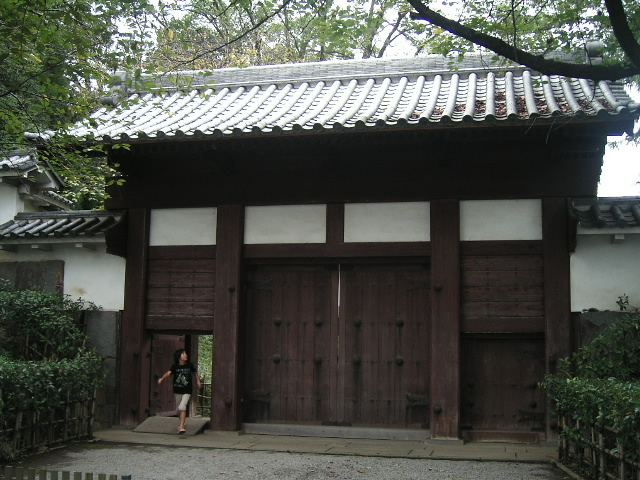
- Dobashi-mon of Tatebayashi Castle

Site information
- Type: flatland-style Japanese castle
- Open to the public: yes

Location

Site history
- Built: 15th century rebuilt 1590
- Built by: Akai Terumitsu, Sakakibara Yasumasa
- In use: Edo period
- Demolished: 1872

Tatebayashi Castle (館林城, Tatebayashi-jō) is a Japanese castle located in Tatebayashi, southern Gunma Prefecture, Japan. At the end of the Edo period, Tatebayashi Castle was home to the Akimoto clan, daimyō of Tatebayashi Domain, but the castle was ruled by a large number of different clans over its history. The castle was also known as "Obiki-jō" (尾曳城).

== History ==
During the Muromachi period, the area around Tatebayashi was controlled by the Akai clan, although records for this period are very uncertain. According to legend, Akai Terumitsu saved a young fox from naughty children, and then in the evening an Inari appeared and recommended a location for his castle, drawing a design for the fortifications on the ground by its tail. The name of Tatebayashi castle first appears in reliable documents dated 1471, when the Uesugi clan ordered an attack on the castle. The territory was contested in the Sengoku period between the Uesugi, Takeda and Later Hōjō clans (through their retainers, the Nagao clan). It was captured by Ishida Mitsunari during the Battle of Odawara without a struggle.

After Tokugawa Ieyasu took control over the Kantō region in 1590, he assigned Sakakibara Yasumasa, one of his most trusted Four Generals as daimyō of Tatebayashi, with revenues of 100,000 koku. Yasumasa completely rebuilt Tatebayashi Castle and the surrounding castle town, as well as constructing waterworks protecting the new town from flooding. The area was strategically important for its control over the Tone River which supplied Edo, and after the Sakakibara clan was reassigned to other territories, the castle was retained by the most trusted of Tokugawa retainers or relatives, including at one point the younger brother of Shōgun Tokugawa Ietsuna, the future shōgun Tokugawa Tsunayoshi.

However, from the death of Tsunayoshi’s son, Tokumatsu, in 1683, the donjon of the castle was allowed to fall to ruin. In 1707 the grandson of Shōgun Tokugawa Iemitsu, Matsudaira Kiyotake, became daimyo and built a two-story yagura near the base of the old donjon to serve as the symbol of the castle, but did not reconstruct the donjon itself.

In 1874, following the Meiji Restoration, a fire destroyed most of the remaining castle structures. Most of the castle grounds were sold off, and the moats filled in. Tatebayashi city hall is located on what was once part of the castle grounds. All that remains of the castle today are some stone walls, and one of the gates of the third bailey.

== Literature ==
- Schmorleitz, Morton S. (1974). Castles in Japan. Tokyo: Charles E. Tuttle Co. pp. 144–145. ISBN 0-8048-1102-4.
- Motoo, Hinago (1986). Japanese Castles. Tokyo: Kodansha. p. 200 pages. ISBN 0-87011-766-1.
- Mitchelhill, Jennifer (2004). Castles of the Samurai: Power and Beauty. Tokyo: Kodansha. p. 112 pages. ISBN 4-7700-2954-3.
- Turnbull, Stephen (2003). Japanese Castles 1540-1640. Osprey Publishing. p. 64 pages. ISBN 1-84176-429-9.
