= Oshi Castle =

Japanese castle in Gyōda, Japan

Coordinates: 36°8′13.74″N 139°27′10.36″E

Oshi Castle 忍城
- Gyōda, Saitama, Japan
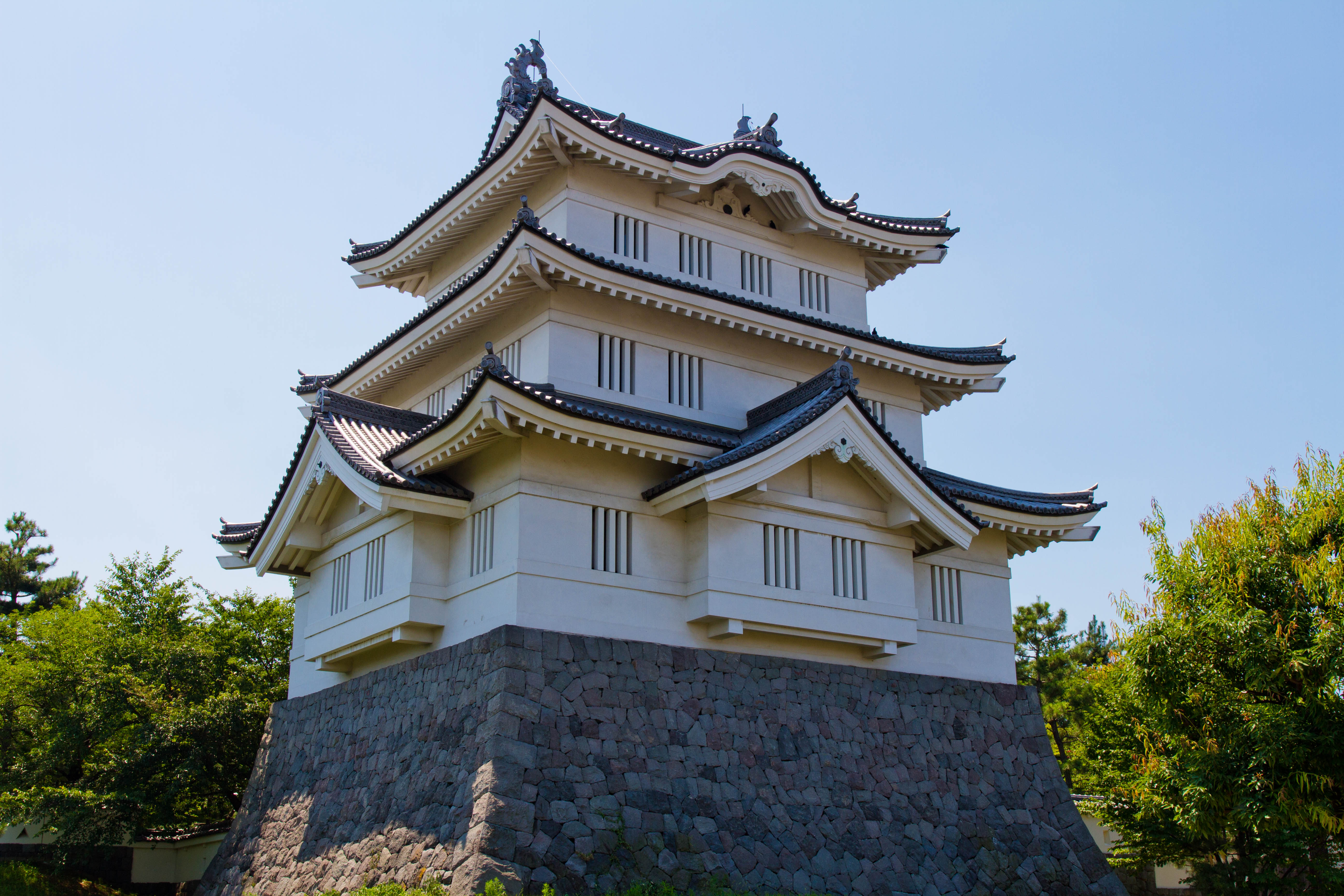
- Reconstructed Yagura of Oshi Castle

Site information
- Type: flatland-style Japanese castle
- Owner: reconstructed 1988
- Open to the public: yes

Location
- Location within Saitama Prefecture Location within Japan

Site history
- Built: 1479
- Built by: Narita Akiyasu
- In use: Sengoku - Edo period
- Demolished: 1871
- Battles/wars: Siege of Oshi (1590)

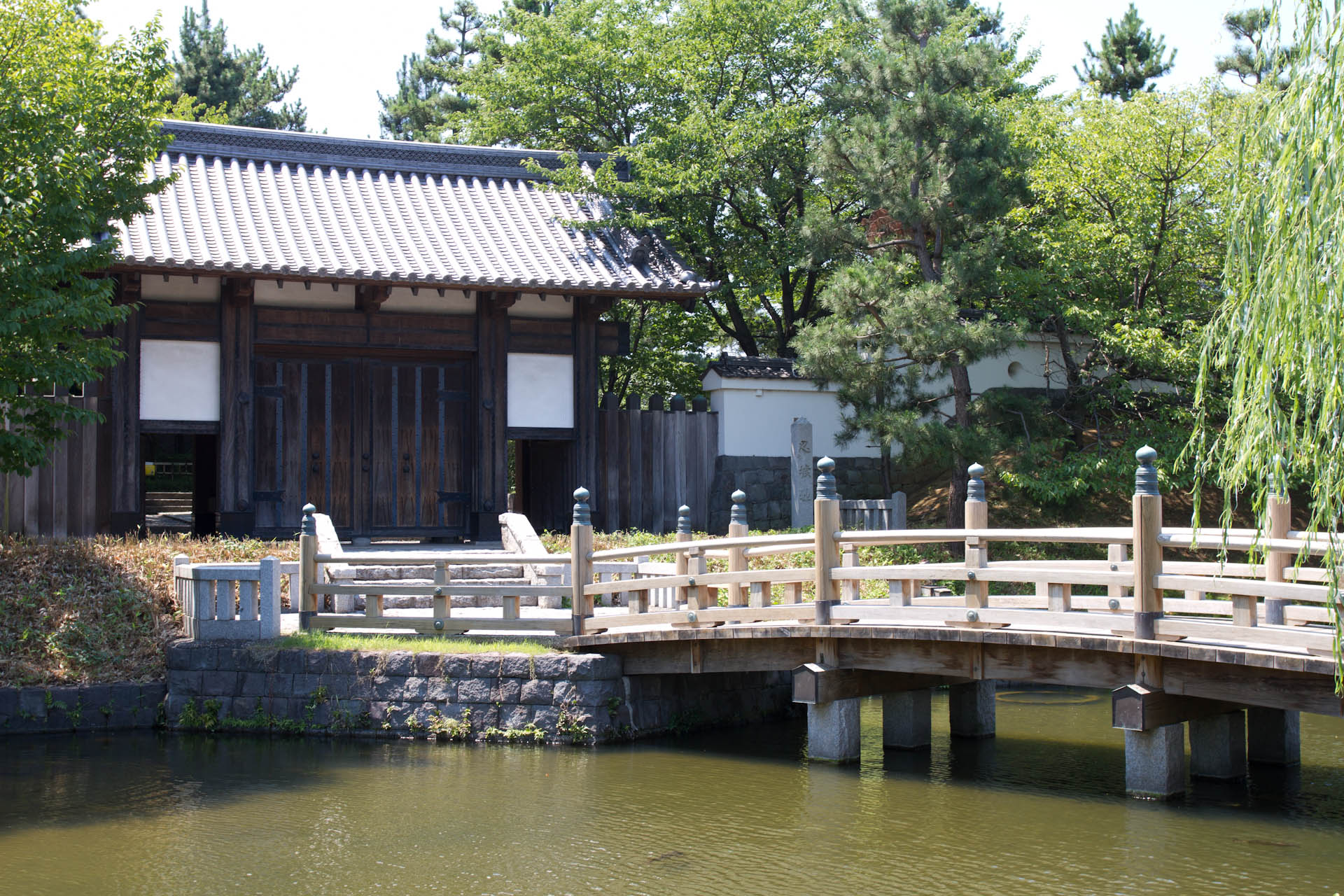
Surviving gate of Oshi Castle

Oshi Castle (忍城, Oshi-jō) is a Japanese castle located in Gyōda, Saitama Prefecture, Japan. During the Edo period, Oshi Castle was the center of the 100,000 koku Oshi Domain, but the castle is far better known for its association with the siege of Oshi during the late Sengoku period. The castle was also known as "Kama-jō" (亀城, Turtle Castle) or "Oshi-no-uki-jō" (忍の浮き城, the Floating Castle of Oshi). It was regarded as one of the seven main strongholds of the Kantō region

== History ==
Oshi Castle was completed by Narita Akiyasu around 1479. The Narita family ruled over the area of Gyōda for initially as vassals to the Ogigayatsu Uesugi clan, changing their allegiance to Odawara Hōjō clan in 1546. The castle town was burned down by Uesugi Kenshin in 1574.

The castle made use of marshes and swamplands in its surroundings and was considered impregnable. In 1590, Toyotomi Hideyoshi dispatched Ishida Mitsunari with an army of 23,000 troops to seize the castle. In the siege of Oshi, the castle’s 619 samurai and 2000 local conscripts held off numerous attacks, including a copy-cat effort to flood the defenders out patterned after Hideyoshi’s famous siege of Takamatsu. Despite Mitsunari’s impressive construction of 28 kilometers of dikes and torrential rains, the castle still held and its defenders only surrendered after receiving word that their overlords had been defeated in the siege of Odawara.

The area came under the control of Tokugawa Ieyasu and the castle was subsequently rebuilt as the center of the 100,000 koku Oshi Domain ruled by a succession of daimyō from various branches of the Matsudaira clan and the Abe clan. The castle town prospered during the Edo period from its proximity to the Nakasendō highway, and location on the Tone River.

Following the Meiji restoration, all of the structures of the castle were destroyed and its site turned into a public park. The current donjon was reconstructed in 1988 to boost local tourism and to function as the Gyōda City Local History Museum行田市郷土博物館 (Gyōda-shi Gōdō Hakubutsukan).

== Literature ==
- De Lange, William (2021). An Encyclopedia of Japanese Castles. Groningen: Toyo Press. pp. 600 pages. ISBN 978-9492722300.
- Schmorleitz, Morton S. (1974). Castles in Japan. Tokyo: Charles E. Tuttle Co. pp. 144–145. ISBN 0-8048-1102-4.
- Motoo, Hinago (1986). Japanese Castles. Tokyo: Kodansha. p. 200 pages. ISBN 0-87011-766-1.
- Mitchelhill, Jennifer (2004). Castles of the Samurai: Power and Beauty. Tokyo: Kodansha. p. 112 pages. ISBN 4-7700-2954-3.
- Turnbull, Stephen (2003). Japanese Castles 1540-1640. Osprey Publishing. p. 64 pages. ISBN 1-84176-429-9.
