= Kochoki =

Japanese anime television series

- Key visual of the series

胡蝶綺 〜若き信長〜 (Kochōki Wakaki Nobunaga)
- Genre: Action
- Anime television series
- Directed by: Noriyuki Abe
- Produced by: Aya Iizuka; Hideo Momoda; Hirotaka Kaneko; Hiroto Yonemori; Jin Kawamura; Keisuke Sato; Masahiro Hibi; Shinji Ōmori; Shousei Ito; Takaharu Kado; Tsuyoshi Kajiwara
- Written by: Ryōta Yamaguchi
- Music by: Yūsuke Shirato
- Studio: Studio Deen
- Licensed by: NA: Funimation
- Original network: AT-X, Tokyo MX, BS Fuji, Wowow Prime
- Original run: July 8, 2019 – September 23, 2019
- Episodes: 12

Kochoki (胡蝶綺 〜若き信長〜, Kochōki Wakaki Nobunaga) is an original anime television series produced by Studio Deen that aired from July 8 to September 23, 2019.

== Synopsis ==
Kochoki: Wakaki Nobunaga is an animated adaptation of Nobunaga Oda's teenage years up to his time as a warlord against his brother, Nobuyuki.

== Cast ==
Character	Japanese	English
Nobunaga Oda	Yūsuke Kobayashi	Daman Mills; Apphia Yu (child)
Tsuneoki Ikeda	Yuma Uchida	Chris Wehkamp
Nobuyuki Oda	Kaito Ishikawa; Nao Tōyama (child)	Stephen Fu; Rachel Glass (child)
Nobuhiro Oda	Tomohiro Tsuboi	Duncan Brennan
Kicho	Yumiri Hanamori	Dawn M. Bennett
Kaede	Atsumi Tanezaki	Mallorie Rodak
Sōon Takugen	Shinnosuke Tachibana	Micah Solusod
Nobuhide Oda	Taiten Kusunoki	Paul Slavens
Gozen Dota	Masako Katsuki	Anastasia Munoz
Ohana	Manami Numakura	Katelyn Barr
Oichi	Nao Tōyama	Sarah Wiedenheft
Hidetaka Oda	Ayumu Murase	Madeleine Morris
Katsuie Shibata	Hidenari Ugaki	Chris Rager
Masahide Hirate	Mugihito	Mark Stoddard
Toshie Maeda	Takuma Terashima	Derick Snow
Kurando Tsuzuki	Satoshi Hino	J. Michael Tatum
Hidesada Hayashi	Kenichirou Matsuda	Jim Johnson
Michitomo Hayashi	Kohsuke Toriumi	Shawn Gann
Kazumasu Takigawa	Junya Enoki	Adam Gibbs
Narimasa Sassa	Makoto Takahashi	Aaron Roberts
Kitsuno Ikoma	Minori Suzuki	Mikaela Krantz
Morishige Sakuma	Atsushi Tamaru	Jordan Dash Cruz
Nobutomo Oda	Teppei Uenishi	Justin Briner

== Release ==
The series was first announced on March 8, 2019. It made its debut on July 8, 2019, on Tokyo MX. Funimation licensed the series and aired their simuldub on July 22 of that same year.
