= Battle of Inō =

1556 battle in Japan

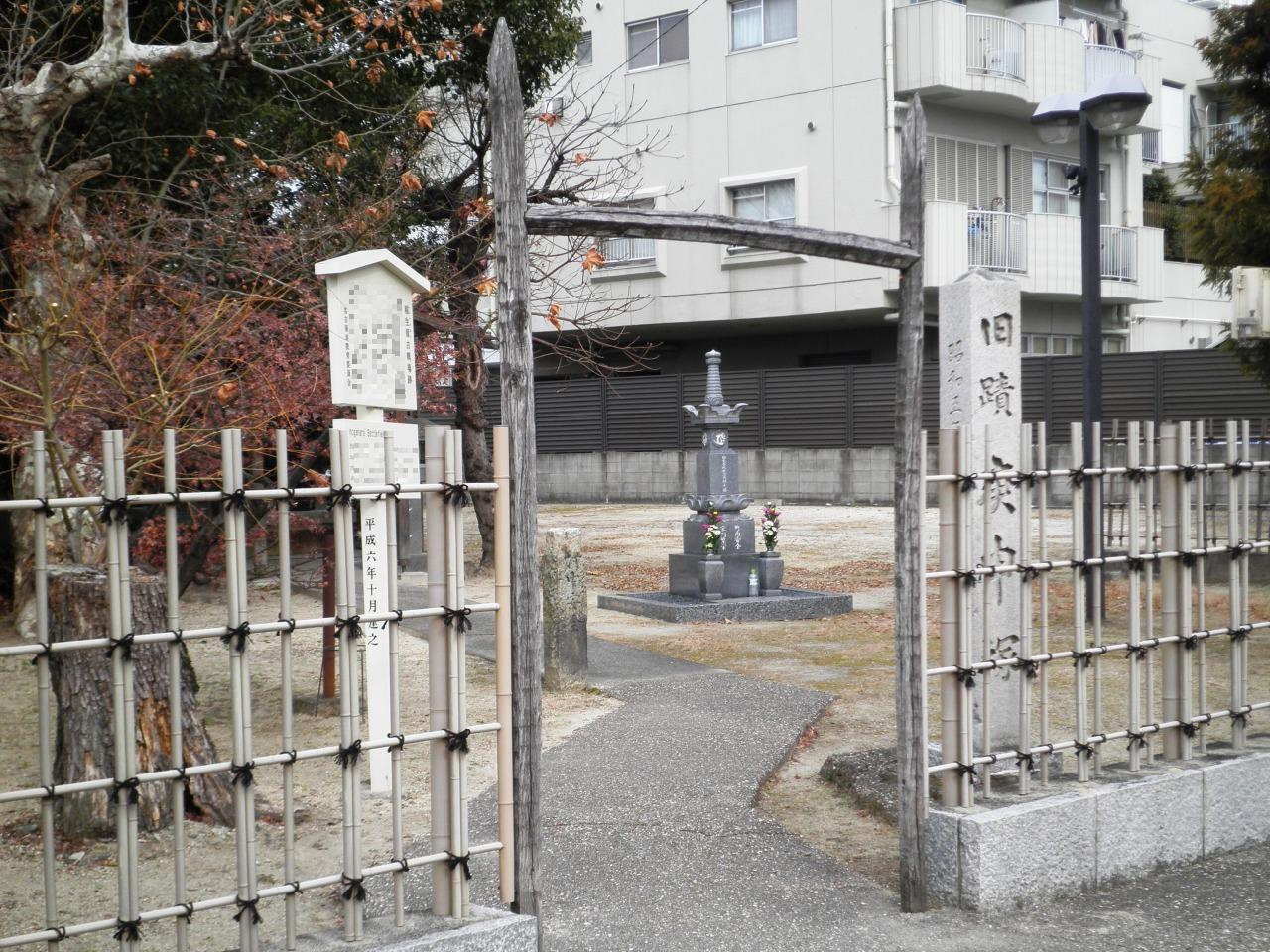
- Inōgahara Battlefield in Nagoya, Aichi.
Date	September 27, 1556 (Kōji era)
Location	Nagoya, Owari Province, Japan 35°12′22″N 136°53′26″E
Result	Oda Nobunaga victory

Belligerents
Forces of Oda Nobunaga	Forces of Oda Nobuyuki

Commanders and leaders
Oda Nobunaga; Oda Shōsaemon; Oda Nobufusa; Mori Yoshinari; Maeda Toshiie; Sassa Magosuke †; Niwa Nagahide; Ikeda Tsuneoki	Oda Nobuyuki; Oda Nobuyasu; Hayashi Hidesada; Hayashi Mimasaka †; Shibata Katsuie; Sakuma Nobumori; Sakuma Morishige

Strength
700	1,700

Casualties and losses
Unknown	More than 450
- Location within Aichi Prefecture Battle of Inō (Japan)

The Battle of Inō took place during the Sengoku period (16th century) of Japan. The battle was fought in Owari Province, in what is now Nishi-ku, Nagoya, between two forces of the Oda clan: the head of the clan Oda Nobunaga and his brother Oda Nobuyuki, who with the support of Oda Nobuyasu, Shibata Katsuie and Hayashi Hidesada, rebelled against Nobunaga.

The three conspirators were defeated at the Battle of Inō, but they were pardoned after the intervention of Tsuchida Gozen, the birth mother of both Nobunaga and Nobuyuki.

Nobuyuki began his second rebellion in 1557, but was defeated and his Suemori Castle was destroyed by Nobunaga's retainer Ikeda Nobuteru.

In 1558, however, Nobuyuki again planned to rebel. When Nobunaga was informed of this by Shibata Katsuie, he faked illness to get close to Nobuyuki and assassinated him in Kiyosu Castle.
