= Sakuma Morishige =

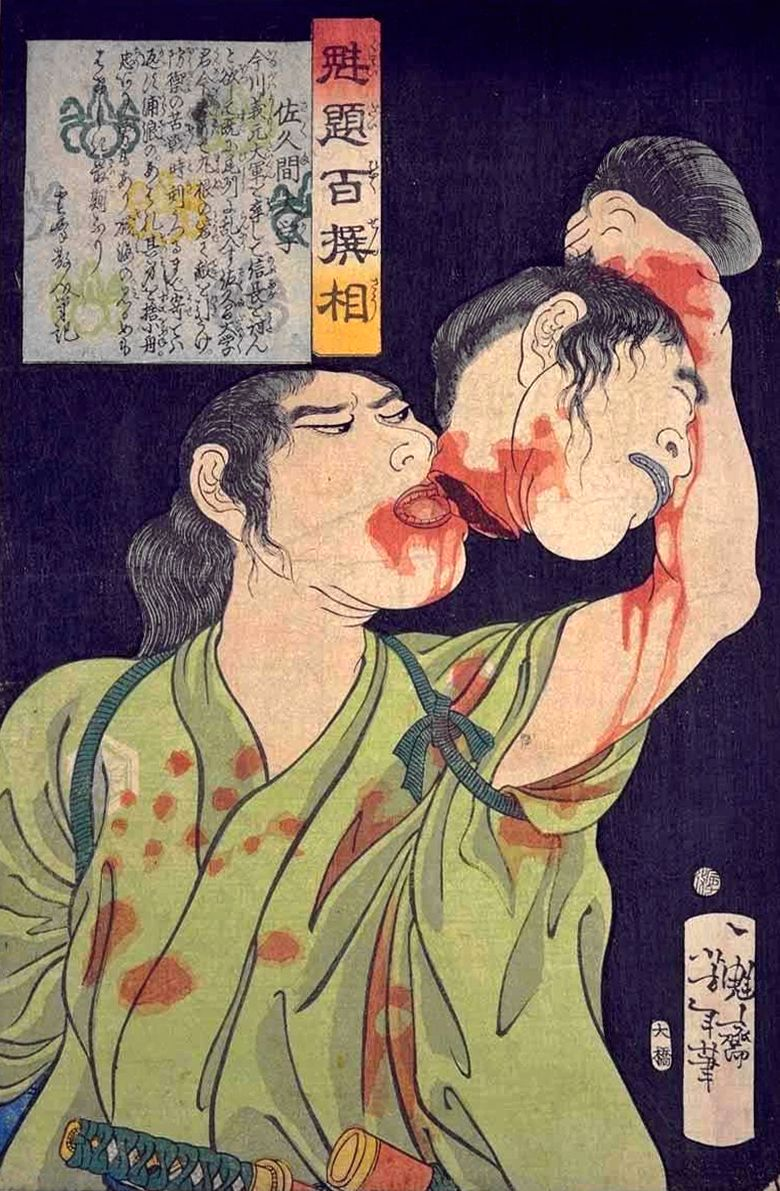
- An ukiyo-e of Sakuma Morishige.
- Native name: 佐久間 盛重
- Died: June 11, 1560; Marune fortress
- Allegiance: Oda clan
- Rank: Samurai
- Commands: Marune fortress
- Battles / wars: Battle of Ino (1556); Siege of Marune (1560)

Sakuma Morishige (佐久間 盛重, died June 11, 1560) was a Japanese samurai from Sakuma clan who served Oda Nobunaga. He is believed to be the first "general' killed by gunfire in Japan.

In 1556, Morishige fought at the Battle of Ino, Before the battle, where Nobunaga clashed with his brother, Nobunaga erected Fort Nazuka in Nishi-ku, Nazuka, Nagoya City, placing Sakuma Morishige in charge. During this conflict, Sakuma notably claimed the head of Hashimoto Juzo, a general under Oda Nobuyuki, earning him significant rewards

In 1560, during the invasion of Owari Province by Imagawa Yoshimoto, leading up to the Battle of Okehazama, Morishige was appointed to defend the Marune fortress on the border of the province.

The fortress came under attack by Tokugawa Ieyasu (who was at that time named Matsudaira Motoyasu). During the Siege of Marune, Ieyasu made effective use of concentrated arquebus fire. Morishige was killed by a bullet, and the fortress fell to Imagawa forces.
