= Ikeda Tsuneoki =

Daimyo

- 池田 恒興
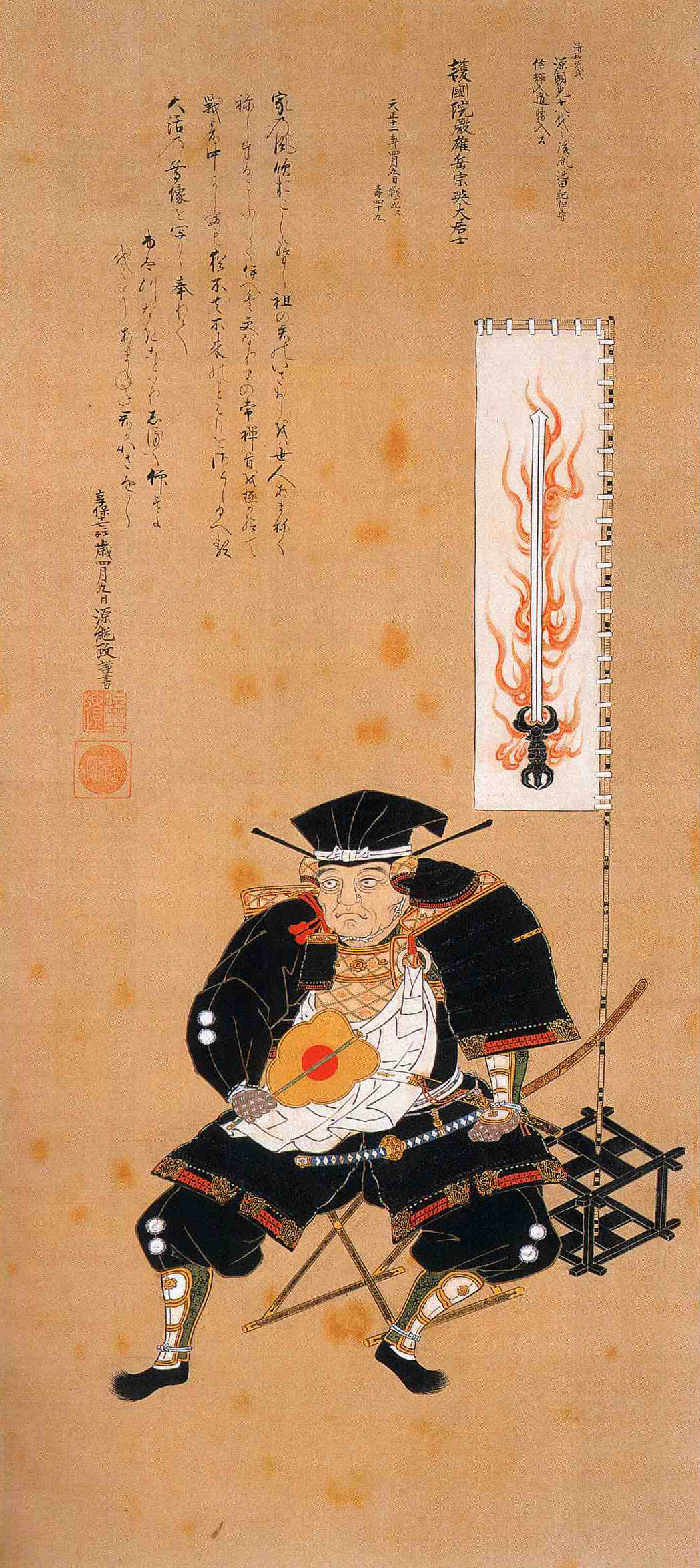

Head of Ikeda clan
- In office 1538–1584
- Preceded by: Ikeda Tsunetoshi
- Succeeded by: Ikeda Terumasa

Lord of Inuyama Castle
- In office 1570–1583
- Preceded by: Oda Nobukiyo
- Succeeded by: Ishikawa Sadakiyo

Lord of Ōgaki
- In office 1583–1584
- Preceded by: Ujiie Naomasa
- Succeeded by: Toyotomi Hidetsugu

Personal details
- Born: 1536 Owari Province
- Died: May 18, 1584 (aged 47–48) Nagakute, Aichi
- Spouse: Zen'ōin
- Relations: Mori Nagayoshi (son in law)
- Nickname(s): "Tsuneoki" "Shōzaburō"

Military service
- Allegiance: Oda clan Toyotomi clan
- Rank: Karō, Daimyo
- Unit: Mino-Ikeda family
- Commands: Inuyama Castle; Ōgaki Castle
- Battles/wars: Battle of Kiyosu Castle; Battle of Inō; Battle of Suemori; Battle of Okehazama; Siege of Inabayama; Battle of Anegawa; Siege of Mount Hiei; Siege of Makishima; Battle of Nagashino; Battle of Tedorigawa; Siege of Hanakuma; Battle of Yamazaki; Battle of Shizugatake; Battle of Komaki and Nagakute

Ikeda Tsuneoki (池田 恒興; 1536 – May 18, 1584), also known as Ikeda Nobuteru (池田 信輝), was an Ikeda clan daimyō and military commander under Oda Nobunaga during the Sengoku period and Azuchi–Momoyama periods of 16th-century Japan. He was a retainer of the famous warlords Oda Nobunaga and Toyotomi Hideyoshi. In his early years, he served Nobunaga since his mother was Nobunaga's foster mother.

== Early life ==
His childhood name is unknown and his common name was Katsuzaburō (勝三郎). His father was Ikeda Tsunetoshi, who served Oda Nobuhide. His mother, Yōtokuin (養徳院), was Oda Nobunaga's wet nurse, and later became Nobuhide's concubine, bearing him a daughter. There are various theories as to his birthplace (including the Owari, Mino, Settsu and Ōmi provinces). He was one of the four karō at Kiyosu Castle. His official position was Kii-no-kami (紀伊守), or "Governor of Kii Province". His courtesy name was Shōzaburō (勝三郎). He later became a priest and referred to himself as Shōnyū (勝入).

== Military life ==
In 1552 - 1554, He took part in the Battle of Kiyosu Castle against Oda Nobutomo, deputy governor of southern Owari.

In 1556, he defeated Oda Nobuyuki, who was guilty of treason against his brother Oda Nobunaga. In 1558, he took over Suemori Castle.

In 1560, he led one of Nobunaga's main forces against Imagawa Yoshimoto at the Battle of Okehazama.

In 1567, he participated in the Siege of Inabayama Castle against the Saitō clan in the first division of Oda Nobunaga's forces, along with Shibata Katsuie.

In 1570, he was active in the Battle of Anegawa against the Azai-Asakura alliance and became the lord of Inuyama Castle.

In 1571, Tsuneoki took part in the burning Siege of Mount Hiei to subdue the followers of the Ishiyama-Honganji; attacks against the Nagashima Ikkō-ikki.

In 1573, he participated in the Siege of Makishima Castle against Ashikaga Yoshiaki. Yoshiaki surrendered, and sending Yoshihiro, his eldest son, as a hostage to Nobunaga.

In 1574, he entered the mountain fortress of Ori Castle in eastern Mino to pin-down Akechi Castle after it was taken by Takeda Katsuyori.

In 1575, he fought in the Battle of Nagashino against the Takeda clan.

In 1577, he took part in the Battle of Tedorigawa against the Uesugi clan.

In 1580, he beat Araki Murashige at Siege of Hanakuma Castle, who locked himself in the castle and was given Murashige's domain at Settsu Province.

In 1582, he led 4000 troops, acted as the spearhead in the right wing, and became the chief vassal of Oda family in Hashiba Hideyoshi's force at the Battle of Yamazaki after the Incident at Honnō-ji, helping defeat Akechi Mitsuhide. He was also in the conference at Kiyosu Castle to decide on Nobunaga's successor.

In 1583, he assisted Hideyoshi at Battle of Shizugatake against Shibata Katsuie and was given 130,000 koku in Mino Province, and became the lord of Ōgaki Castle.

In 1584, he fought in the Battle of Komaki and Nagakute on the side of Hideyoshi. He captured Inuyama Castle on his first assault.

== Death ==
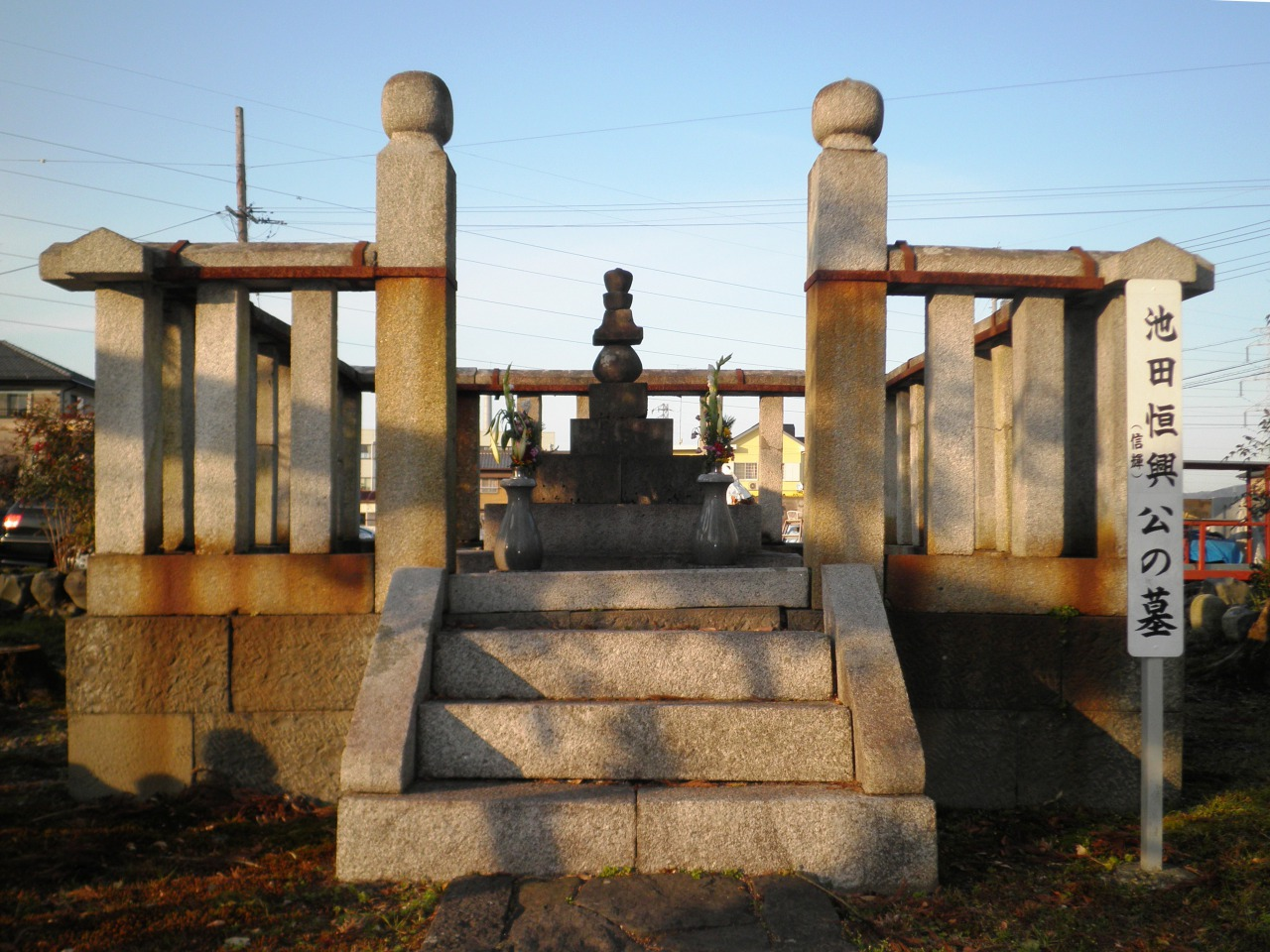
Grave of Ikeda Tsuneoki in Ikeda Gifu

In May 1584, during Battle of Komaki and Nagakute, Tsuneoki, his eldest son, Ikeda Motosuke, and his son-in-law, Mori Nagayoshi, were killed by Tokugawa Ieyasu's forces in the Battle at Nagakute. His daughter, Ikeda Sen, and his son, Ikeda Terumasa, survived the battle. Ikeda Terumasa, his second son, succeeded him as the new head of the Ikeda clan.

== Family ==
- Father: Ikeda Tsunetoshi (d. 1538)
- Mother: Yotokuin (1515–1608)
- Wife: Zen'ōin
- Concubines
- Children:
  - Ikeda Motosuke (1559–1584) by Zen'ōin
  - Senhime (?-1599), married Mori Nagayoshi, later married Nakamura Kazuuji
  - Ikeda Terumasa (1565-1613) by Zen'ōin
  - Ikeda Nagayoshi (1570–1614) by Zen'ōin
  - Ikeda Nagamasa (1575–1607) by Zen'ōin
  - Waka-Mandokoro married Toyotomi Hidetsugu
  - Tenkyuin married Yamazaki Iemori
  - daughter married Asano Yoshinaga
  - daughter married Oda Katsunaga
