= Hayashi Hidesada =

Japanese samurai

Hayashi Hidesada 林 秀貞

Lord of Kasugai

Personal details
- Born: 1513; Owari Province
- Died: 1580; Kyoto
- Nickname: "Michikatsu"

Military service
- Allegiance: Oda clan
- Rank: Karō
- Unit: Hayashi clan (Owari)
- Commands: Kasugai, Aichi
- Battles/wars: Battle of Azukizaka (1542); Battle of Kanōguchi (1547); Battle of Azukizaka (1548); Battle of Ino (1556)

Hayashi Hidesada (林 秀貞, 1513 – November 21, 1580) was a Japanese samurai and retainer of Oda clan, who lived during the Sengoku period. He was also known as Michikatsu (通勝). His court title was Governor of Sado Province (Sado no Kami). The Hayashi family, a branch of the Inaba clan, originated from the village of Oki in the Kasugai District of Owari Province.

== Biography ==
Michikatsu, born in the early decades of the 16th century, served the Oda clan, first under Oda Nobuhide, and then under the young Oda Nobunaga, upon Nobunaga's assignment to Nagoya Castle. Hidesada was the head karō; together with Hirate Masahide, he served as Nobunaga's guardian. In 1546, he assisted at Nobunaga's genpuku ceremony.

Soon after Nobuhide's death in 1551, Hidesada became concerned about Nobunaga's erratic behavior, and secretly supported Oda Nobuyuki, Nobunaga's brother, as successor to the family headship.

In 1555, Nobunaga killed Oda Nobutomo and captured Kiyosu Castle; Hidesada was made to defend Nagoya Castle. Nobunaga unified the Oda clan by defeating all opponents, and took control of Owari Province. However, Hidesada was still deeply dissatisfied with Nobunaga.

In 1556, Hidesada together with Shibata Katsuie gathered troops to oust Nobunaga and replace him with Oda Nobuyuki. They lost in the Battle of Inō and a temporary truce was brokered by Nobunaga, who did not want to continue a fight that might draw an invasion from neighboring daimyōs. Hidesada and Katsuie were both pardoned and retained their positions to work for the Oda clan. Two years later, Nobuyuki was tricked again by Nobunaga; this time, he was killed.

In November 1575, he decided to retire. Oda Nobutada was then made the heir to the clan leadership, and Hidesada was ordered to mentor Nobutada.

In August 1580, Nobunaga suddenly decided to banish Hidesada from all positions for having supported Nobuyuki in the past. The reason seems to be highly trivial and it is most likely that Nobunaga decided that Hidesada had outlived his usefulness and decided to trim down the number of retainers. He probably lived in Kyoto from that point onward, and died a few months later.
