= Battle of Azukizaka =

Two battles in Japanese history were named Battle of Azukizaka:

- Battle of Azukizaka (1542) between Oda Nobuhide's forces and those of Imagawa Yoshimoto
- Battle of Azukizaka (1564) between the Ikkō-ikki and the samurai of Tokugawa Ieyasu
