= Sessai Chōrō =

Japanese monk of the Sengoku period (died 1557)

- Died: 1557
- Citizenship: Japanese

Sessai Chōrō (雪斎長老) (died 1557) or Imagawa Sessai, also known as Taigen Sessai (太原雪斎), was a Japanese abbot and mountain ascetic (yamabushi). He was an uncle of Imagawa Yoshimoto, and served him as military advisor and as commander of Imagawa's forces, despite his lack of any formal battle training or experience.

Sessai aided his nephew in consolidating the Imagawa territories, and in a number of political maneuvers which gained Imagawa influence over the Matsudaira family. However, Yoshimoto soon came into conflict with the Oda clan, and faced defeat at the 1542 battle of Azukizaka. After this, he left Sessai in command of his armies. By 1551 he had secured a young Matsudaira Takechiyo or Matsudaira Motoyasu (later known as Tokugawa Ieyasu) a member of the Matsudaira family as a hostage after he laid Siege of Oda's Anjo Castle.

In 1552–1554, Imagawa secured a treaty and alliance between his family and those of the Hōjō and Takeda Shingen. At some point after this, Sessai began to advise Matsudaira Motoyasu, though the extent of his role in Tokugawa's military exploits is unclear, and unlikely to be great.

Sessai died in 1557 due to complications from gout, three years before Yoshimoto would die at the Battle of Okehazama, precipitating the decline of the Imagawa.
