= Siege of Marune =

1560 siege in Japan

Coordinates: 35°3′52″N 136°56′43″E

- Part of Battle of Okehazama
Date	1560
Location	Owari Province
Result	Imagawa victory

Belligerents
forces of Imagawa Yoshimoto	forces of Oda Nobunaga

Commanders and leaders
Matsudaira Motoyasu; Sakai Tadatsugu; Ishikawa Kazumasa; Koriki Kiyonaga	Sakuma Morishige †

Strength
5,000	600

Casualties and losses
significant	entire garrison
- Location within Aichi Prefecture Siege of Marune (Japan)

The siege of Marune (丸根砦の戦い) was a battle during the Sengoku period (16th century) of Japan. Marune was a frontier fortress in the possession of Oda Nobunaga.

Matsudaira Motoyasu (who would later come to be known as Tokugawa Ieyasu) was at the time a forced retainer of the Imagawa, captured the fortress as part of the Imagawa advance that led to the fateful Battle of Okehazama in 1560. Throughout Motoyasu's siege of the castle, he and his men were not present at the Battle of Okehazama where Imagawa Yoshimoto was killed in Nobunaga's surprise assault.

In this siege, Motoyasu made good use of concentrated arquebus fire. Later during the siege, Sakuma Morishige the commander of the fortress, was killed by a bullet.
