= Dota Gozen =

Japanese noblewoman and mother of Oda Nobunaga

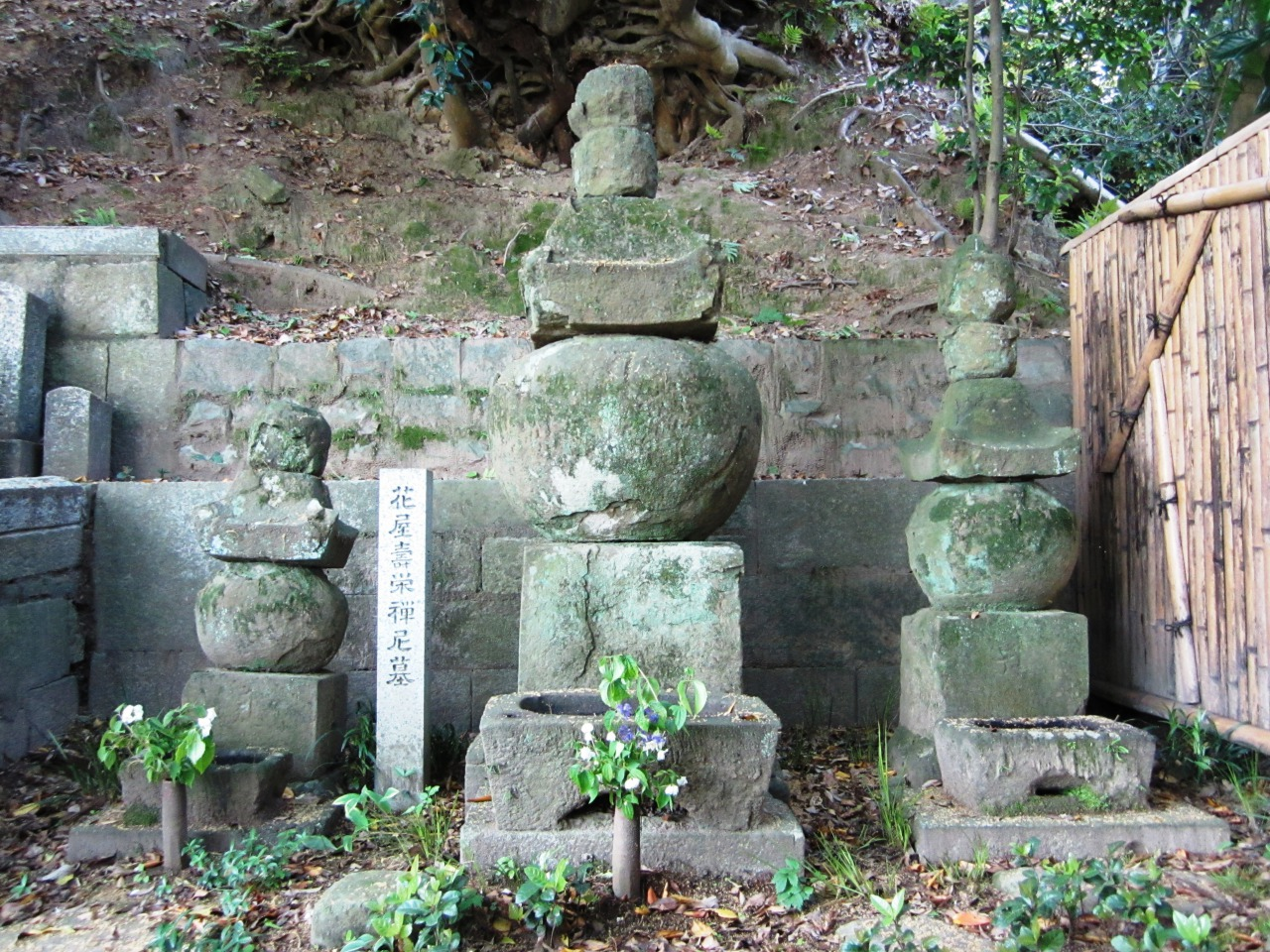
Dota Gozen grave at Shitennō-ji in Tsu

Dota Gozen (土田 御前; died 26 February 1594), also known as Tsuchida Gozen, was a Japanese noblewoman and the mother of Oda Nobunaga, a major daimyō and politician of the Sengoku period regarded as the first "Great Unifier" of Japan.

== Biography ==
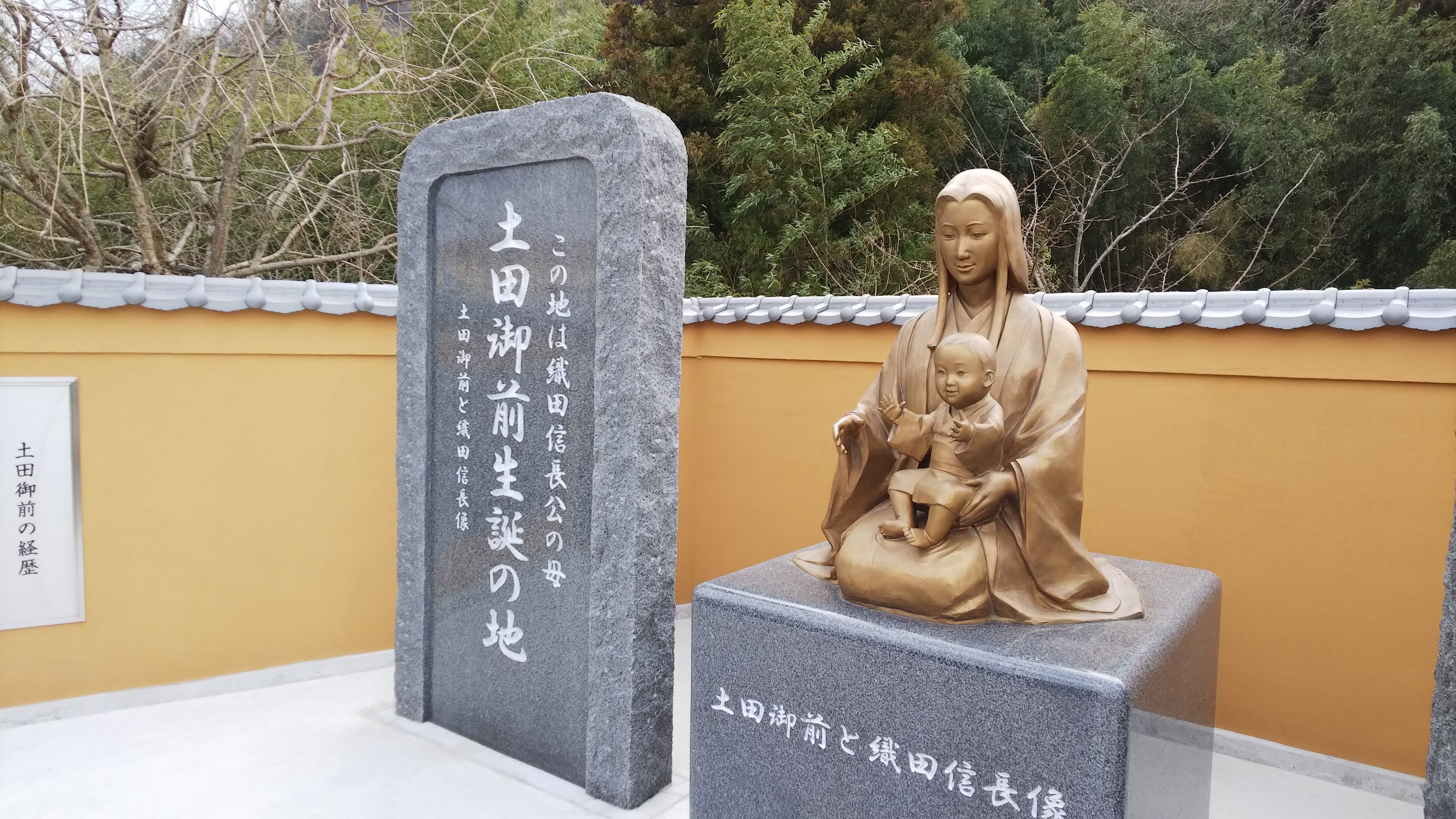
Statue of Tsuchida Gozen near Kani, Gifu Prefecture

Dota Gozen's origins are unknown, including her date and location of birth, her ancestry, and her real name. Gozen is assumed to be the daughter of Dota Masahisa, also known as Tsuchida Masahisa, a samurai possibly descended from the Rokkaku clan, but this is unconfirmed. Gozen was married to Oda Nobuhide, a deputy shugo (shugodai) and de facto ruler of Owari Province and the head of the powerful Oda clan. She is the biological mother of four sons, Nobunaga, Nobuyuki, Nobukane, and Hidetaka; and two daughters, Oinu, and Oichi.

According to rumors, Gozen did not like her eldest son Nobunaga, notorious in Owari for his eccentric and unconventional behavior, and instead preferred his well-mannered younger brother, Nobuyuki. When Nobuhide died in 1551, Gozen lived in Suemori Castle with her second son, Nobuyuki, and supported him in the succession crisis that occurred. Although Nobunaga was the legitimate heir as head of the Oda clan, Nobuyuki and other family members plotted against his succession. When Nobuyuki attempted to usurp Nobunaga but failed, Gozen interfered and asked Nobunaga to take mercy on his brother, which he accepted and turned his attention to other rivals. However, Nobuyuki eventually tried to usurp Nobunaga again and, this time, Nobunaga killed him and destroyed Suemori Castle in the process.

Afterward, she lived with Nobunaga and Oichi and looked after their children (Nobutada, Nobukatsu, Nobutaka, Chacha, Hatsu, Gō, etc.) when they were young. Gozen outlived both Nobunaga and her grandson Oda Nobutada after their death in the Honno-ji Incident in 1582.

Gozen spent her later life with Nobukane at Tsu Castle until her death on 26 February 1594, and is buried at Shitennō-ji located in modern-day Tsu, Mie Prefecture.

== Family ==
- Father: Dota Masahisa
- Husband: Oda Nobuhide (1510–1551)
- Sons:
  - Oda Nobunaga (1534–1582)
  - Oda Nobuyuki (1536–1557)
  - Oda Nobukane (1548–1614)
  - Oda Hidetaka (died 1555)
- Daughters:
  - Oichi (1547–1583)
  - Oinu (died 1582)
