= Shiroyama Hachimangū =

Shinto shrine in Nagoya, Japan

Shiroyama Hachimangū (城山八幡宮)
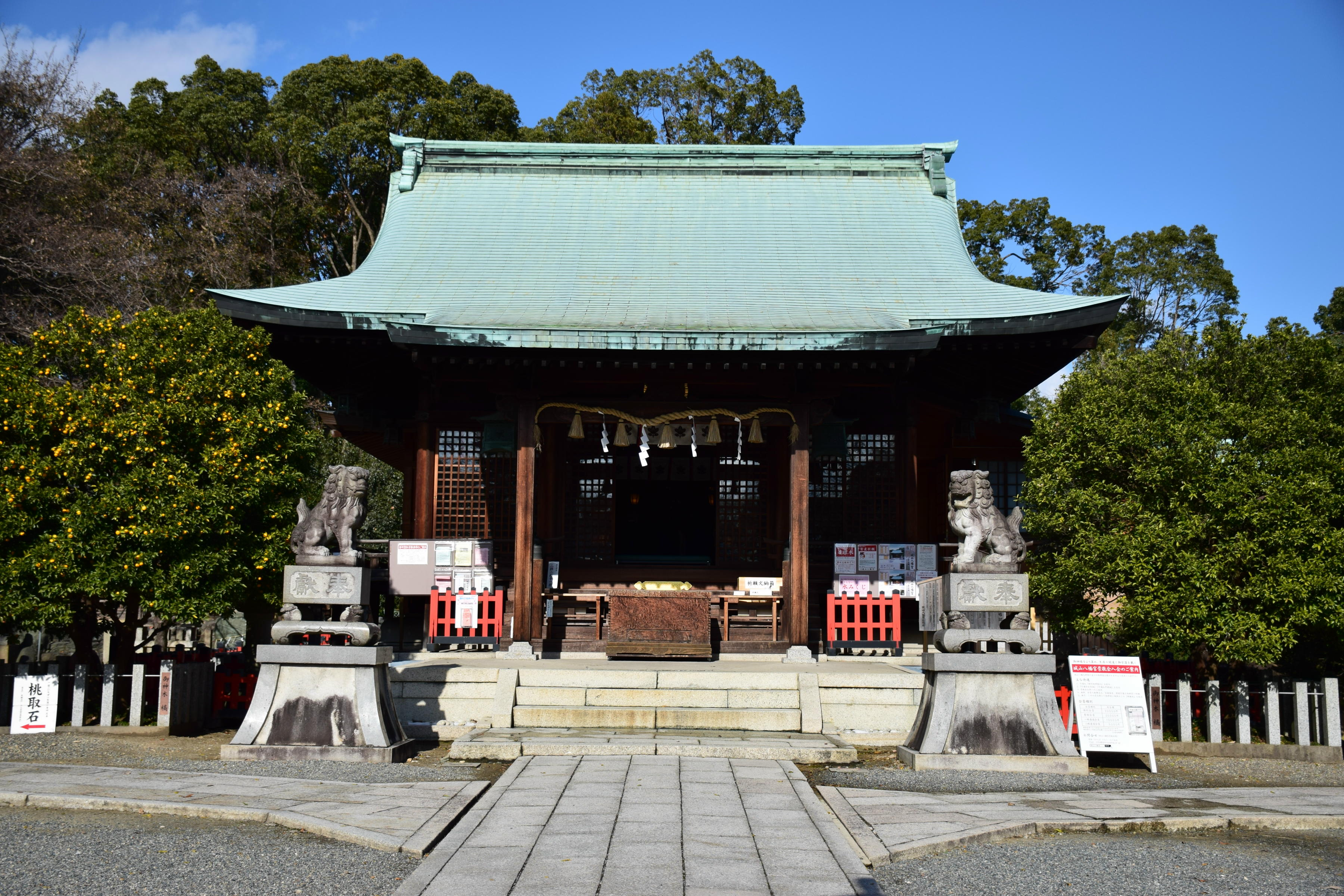
- Shiroyama Hachimangū

- Location within Japan

Religion
- Affiliation: Shinto

Location
- Location: Nagoya, central Japan
- Coordinates: 35°10′03″N 136°57′35″E

Shiroyama Hachimangū (城山八幡宮), also known as Shiroyama Hakusan, is a Shinto shrine located in the city of Nagoya, central Japan.

== History ==
The shrine is located on the premises of the ruined Suemori Castle. The castle itself dates back to the 16th century. The shrine hosts night-time festivals (matsuri) in both July and October, featuring traditional Japanese music and dance performances.

An unusual feature is a sacred Marital Tree, whose trunk split into two parts and grew back together at a later time. This tree is worshipped as a symbol of happy marriage and restoration of relationships.

Access by public transport is Motoyama Station on the Higashiyama Line and then a five minutes walk uphill to the north.
