= Kiyosu Castle =

Japanese castle located in Kiyosu, Aichi, Japan

Coordinates: 35.217°N 136.844°E

Kiyosu Castle 清洲城
- Kiyosu, Aichi Prefecture, Japan
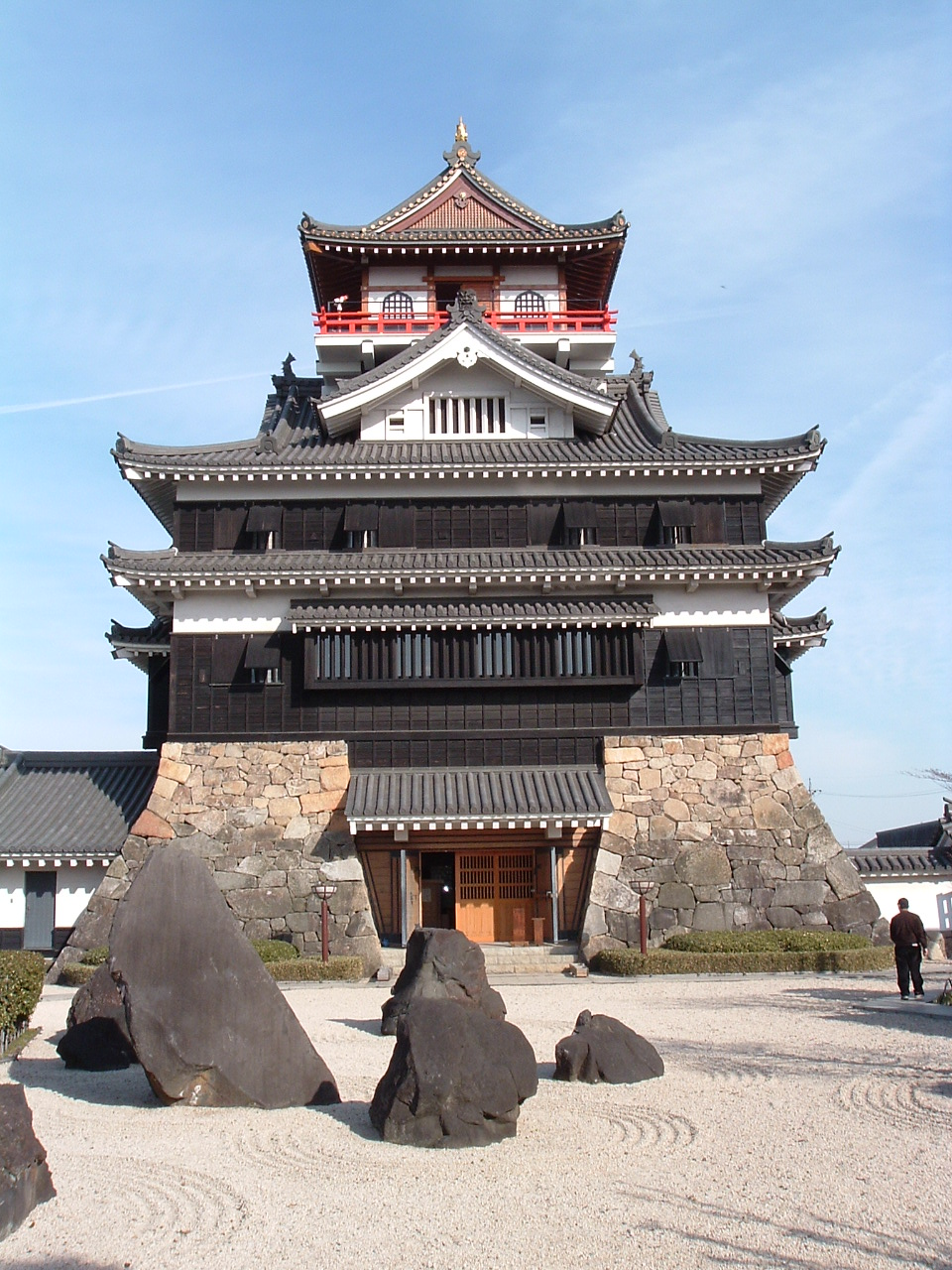
- Reconstructed Main Keep of Kiyosu Castle

Site information
- Type: flatland-style Japanese castle
- Owner: reconstructed 1989
- Open to the public: yes

Location

Site history
- Built: 1394-1407
- Built by: Shiba Yoshishige
- In use: Sengoku period
- Demolished: 1609

Kiyosu Castle (清洲城, Kiyosu-jō) is a Japanese castle located in Kiyosu, western Aichi Prefecture, Japan. It is noted for its association with the rise to power of the Sengoku period warlord Oda Nobunaga. The kanji in the name of the castle was written as 清須城. The current partial reconstruction dates to 1989 and was built as a centennial celebration for the modern-day city of Kiyosu.

== History ==
Kiyosu Castle was built between 1394 and 1427, to guard the strategic junction of the Ise Kaidō with the Nakasendō highways connecting Kyoto with Kamakura. The area was dominated by Shiba Yoshishige, then head of the Shiba clan and the shugo (governor) of Owari, Echizen and Tōtōmi Provinces.

Upon completion of construction, Oda Toshisada was installed in the castle as the shugodai (vice-governor of the province). It is thought to have been intended as a defensive stronghold meant to protect Orizu Castle, the seat of Owari's provincial government until its destruction during battle in 1478 during a civil war between various factions of the Oda clan. After the loss of Orizu Castle, Oda Nobuhide shifted his seat to Kiyosu, bringing prosperity to the city, from which he ruled the four counties of lower Owari Province.

After Nobuhide died in 1551, his son Oda Nobunaga was initially unable to assume control of the entire clan. Nobuhide’s younger brother Oda Nobutomo, with the support of Shiba Yoshimune, took over Kiyosu Castle in 1553. After Yoshimune revealed to Nobunaga an assassination plot in 1554, Nobutomo had Yoshimune put to death. The next year, Nobunaga retook Kiyosu Castle and captured his uncle, forcing him to commit suicide not long after. Nobunaga also had his younger brother, Oda Nobuyuki assassinated at Kiyosu Castle’s donjon in 1557. Nobunaga sealed his alliance with Tokugawa Ieyasu during treaty negotiations held at Kiyosu Castle in 1562. Nobunaga relocated from Kiyosu to Iwakura Castle in 1563.

After Nobunaga's death, Toyotomi Hideyoshi assembled his retainers at Kiyosu Castle and proclaimed his regency over Nobunaga’s infant grandson, Oda Hidenobu. Kiyosu Castle itself came under the control of Nobunaga’s second son, Oda Nobukatsu, who began large scale renovations in 1586, which included a double ring of moats, as well as a large and a small donjon It was remodeled by expanding the castle grounds to roughly 1.6 km east to west and 2.8 km north to south. However, Nobukatsu fell afoul of Toyotomi Hideyoshi when he refused orders to change his domains, and was replaced at Kiyosu by Fukushima Masanori in 1595. After the Battle of Sekigahara in 1600, Fukushima Masanori was relocated to Hiroshima Castle, and Kiyosu was reassigned to Tokugawa Ieyasu’s 4th son, Matsudaira Tadayoshi. However, he was in poor health from wounds suffered at Sekigahara, and died in 1607. The castle then passed to Tokugawa Yoshinao. In 1609, by order of Tokugawa Ieyasu, Yoshinao was ordered to relocate the seat of his government to Nagoya Castle. The move occurred from 1609-1613, during which time most of the buildings of Kiyosu Castle were dismantled and relocated to Nagoya. Parts of Nagoya Castle were reconstructed with the use of building materials taken from Kiyosu Castle. The northwest turret of Nagoya Castle's Ofukemaru bailey was called the "Kiyosu Yagura," as it was constructed using parts taken from the Kiyosu Castle donjon. The original kinshachi (金鯱) from Kiyosu Castle are now preserved in the Buddhist temple of Sōfuku-ji in Gifu City in neighboring Gifu Prefecture, and a former gate of the castle is preserved at the temple of Ryōfuku-ji in Owari-Asahi and some of the decorated sliding doors from the castle are at the temple of Soken-ji in Naka-ku, Nagoya.

== Reconstruction ==
By the Meiji period, there was very little remaining of the ruins of Kiyosu Castle aside from earthenworks in the former main bailey. The tracks for the Tōkaidō Main Line railway were laid directly across the site. During the Shōwa period, a municipal park was created around the site of the castle, and a bronze statue of Oda Nobunaga was erected in 1936, portraying a young Nobunaga on the eve of the decisive Battle of Okehazama. In 1989, to mark the centennial of the foundation of the modern town of Kiyosu, a reinforced concrete replica donjon was built. The reconstruction is not accurate, as no plans or illustrations of the original Kiyosu Castle have survived, and the reconstruction is based on the donjon of Inuyama Castle as being representative of the period. Inside the structure is a local history museum, with displays of arms and armor.

Next to the castle is the Kiyosu Armor Factory, which is run by local volunteers. It teaches visitors by armor artisans, and manufactures medieval protective gear.

== Gallery ==
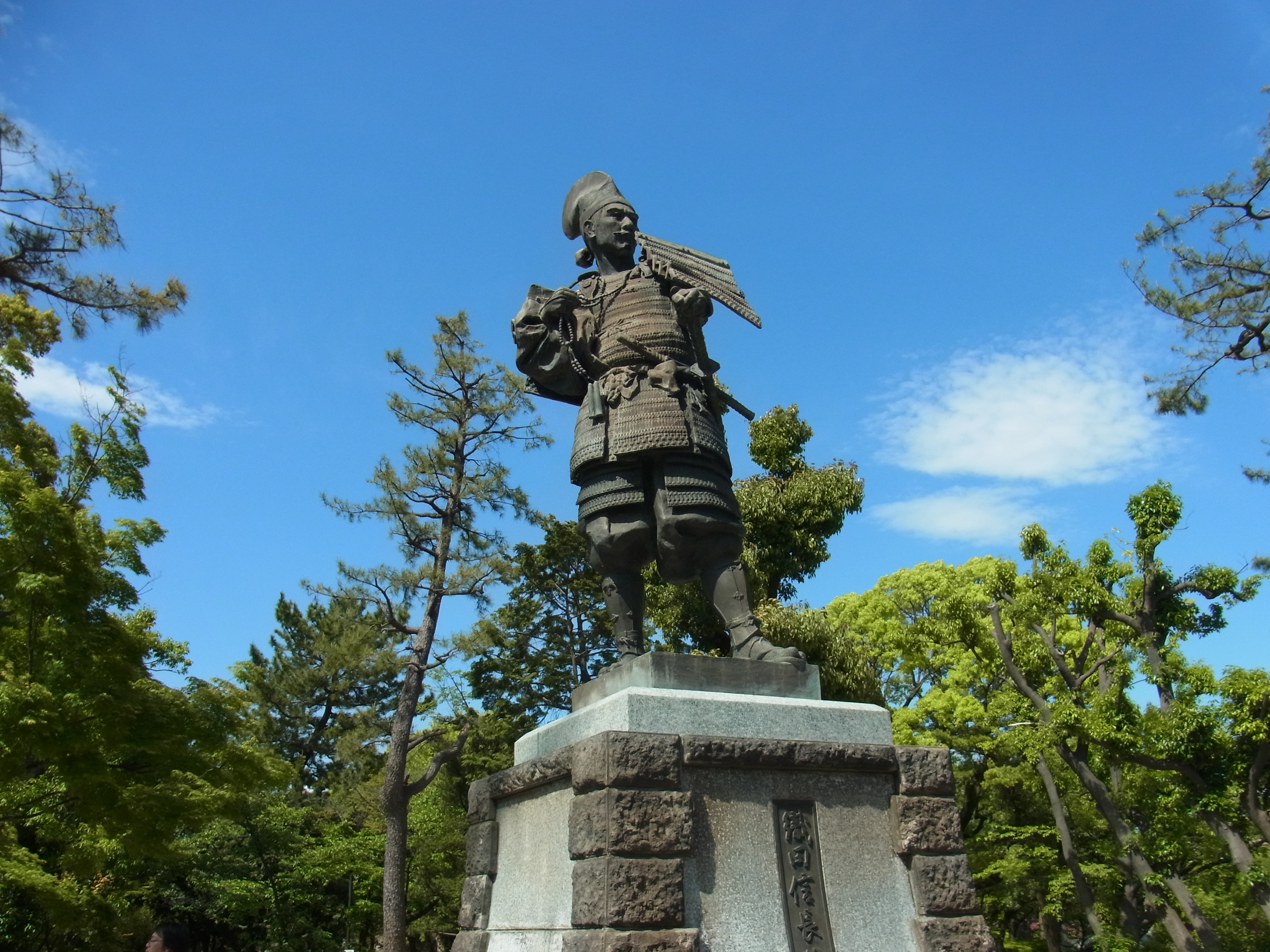
Bronze statue of Oda Nobunaga (Kiyosu City, Aichi Prefecture, Kiyosu Park)

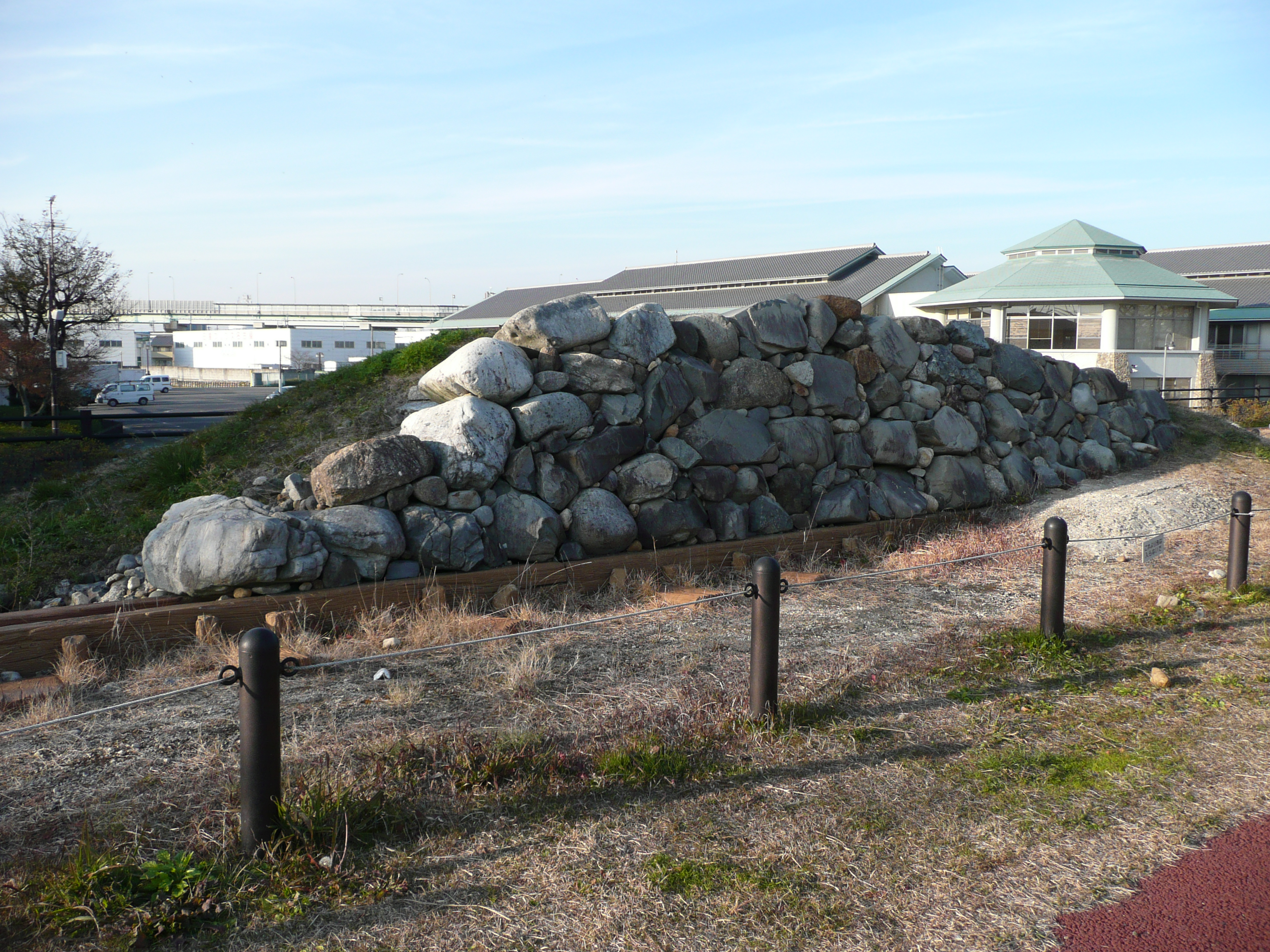
Kiyosu Castle stone wall

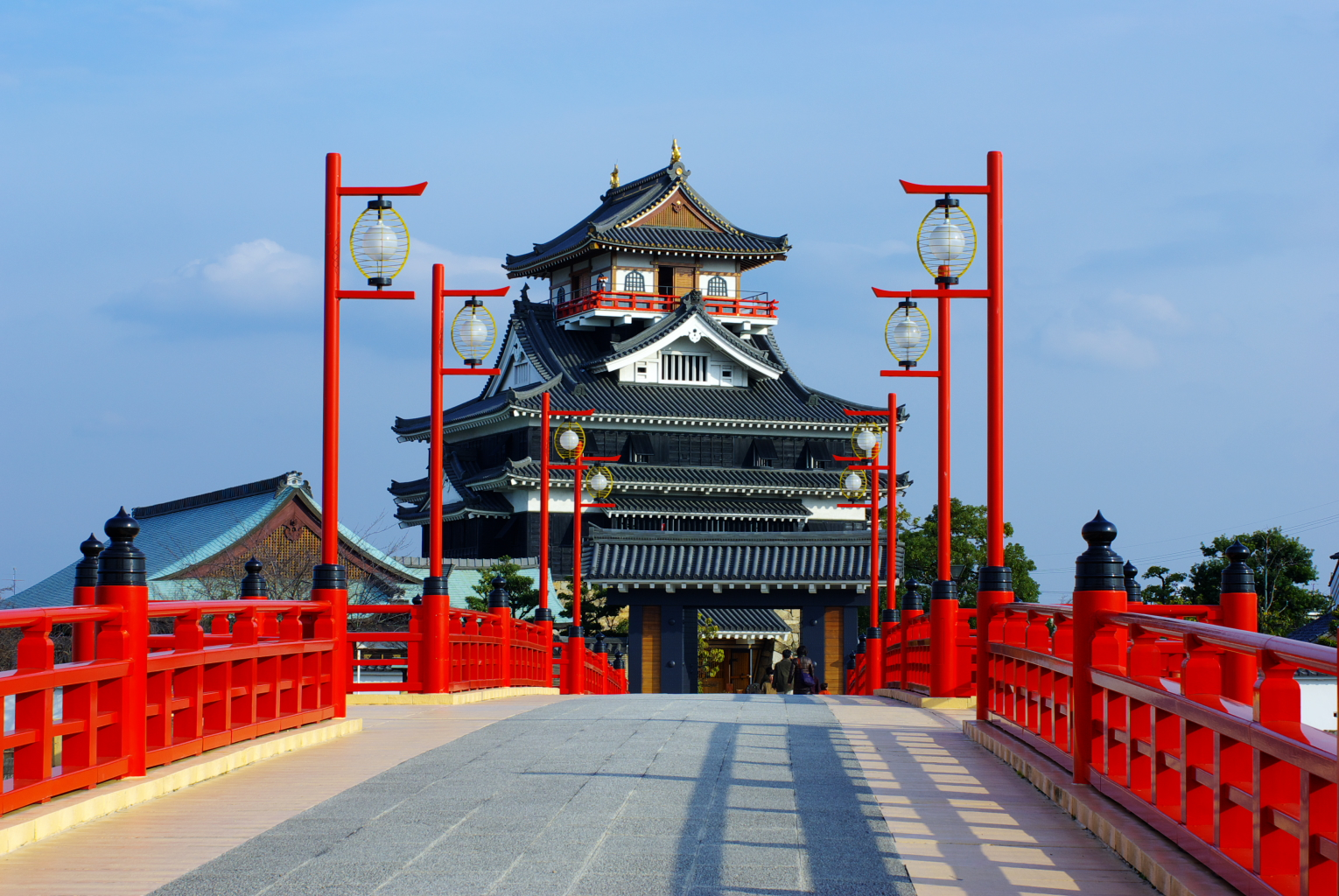
Kiyosu Castle

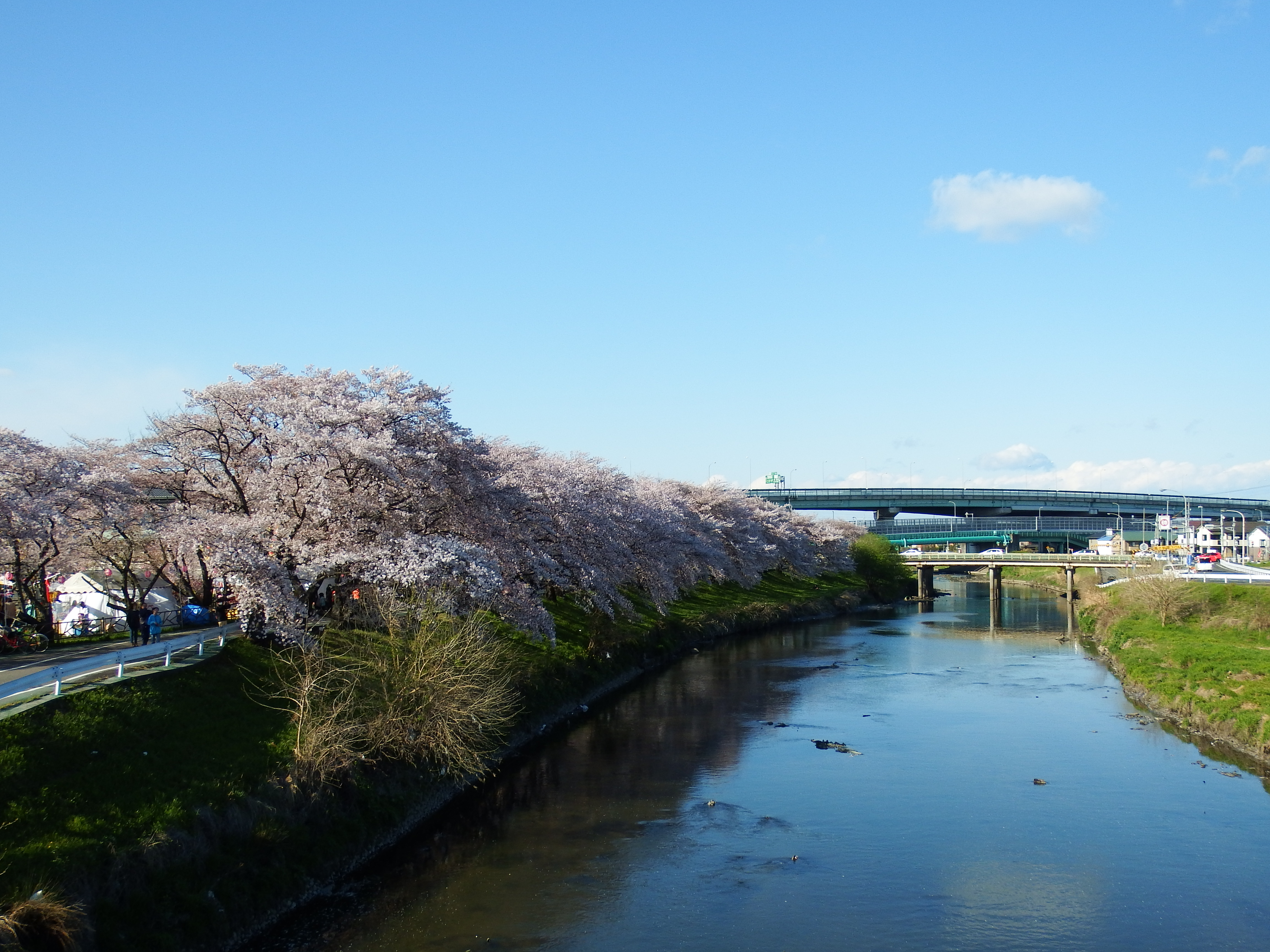
Sakura on the Gojō River and the riverside

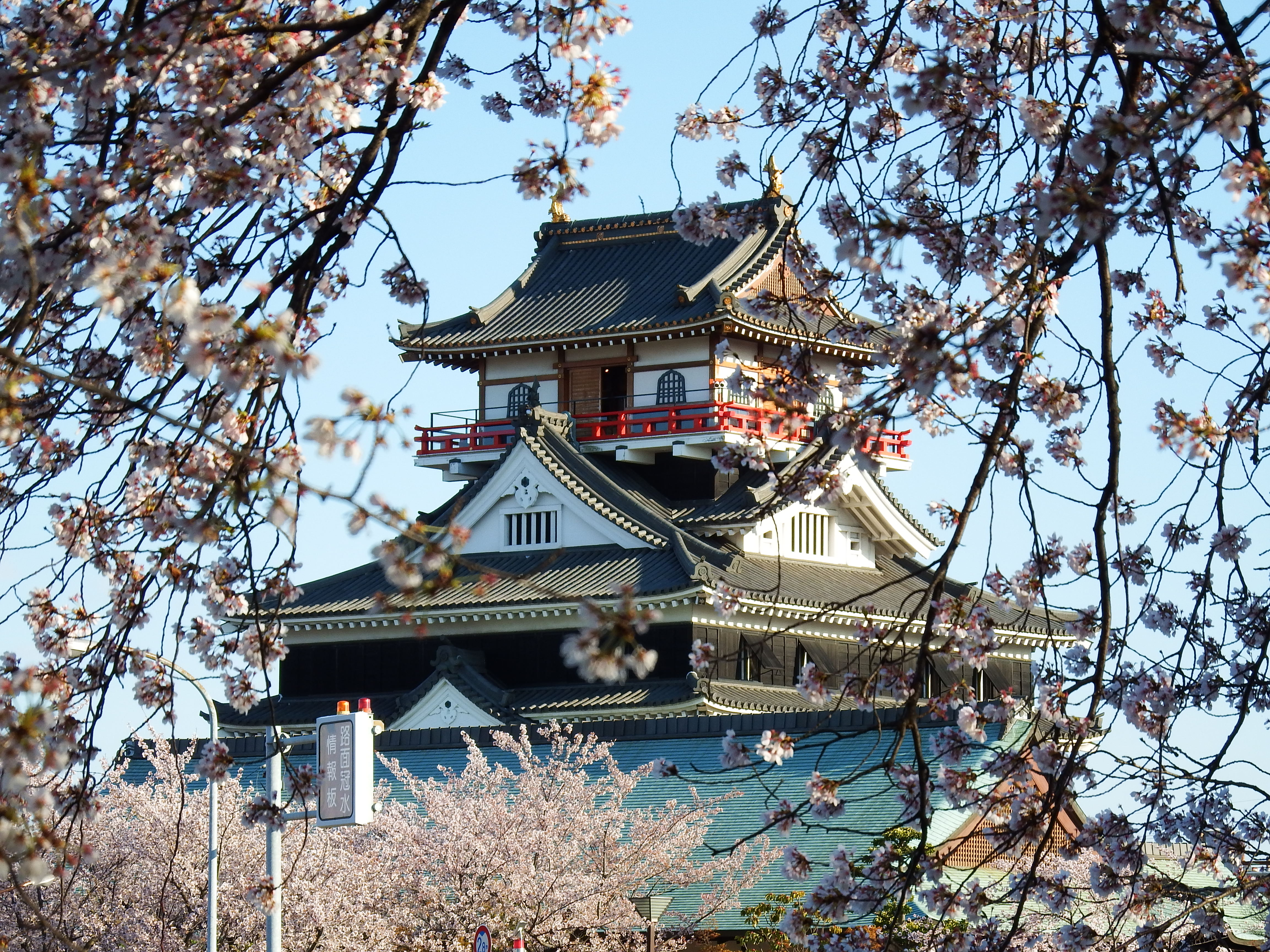
Kiyosu Castle and Sakura

== Literature ==
- De Lange, William (2021). An Encyclopedia of Japanese Castles. Groningen: Toyo Press. pp. 600 pages. ISBN 978-9492722300.
- Schmorleitz, Morton S. (1974). Castles in Japan. Tokyo: Charles E. Tuttle Co. pp. 144–145. ISBN 0-8048-1102-4.
- Motoo, Hinago (1986). Japanese Castles. Tokyo: Kodansha. p. 200 pages. ISBN 0-87011-766-1.
- Mitchelhill, Jennifer (2004). Castles of the Samurai: Power and Beauty. Tokyo: Kodansha. p. 112 pages. ISBN 4770029543.
- Turnbull, Stephen (2003). Japanese Castles 1540-1640. Osprey Publishing. p. 64 pages. ISBN 1841764299.
