= Kani Saizō =

Japanese samurai

- 可児 才蔵
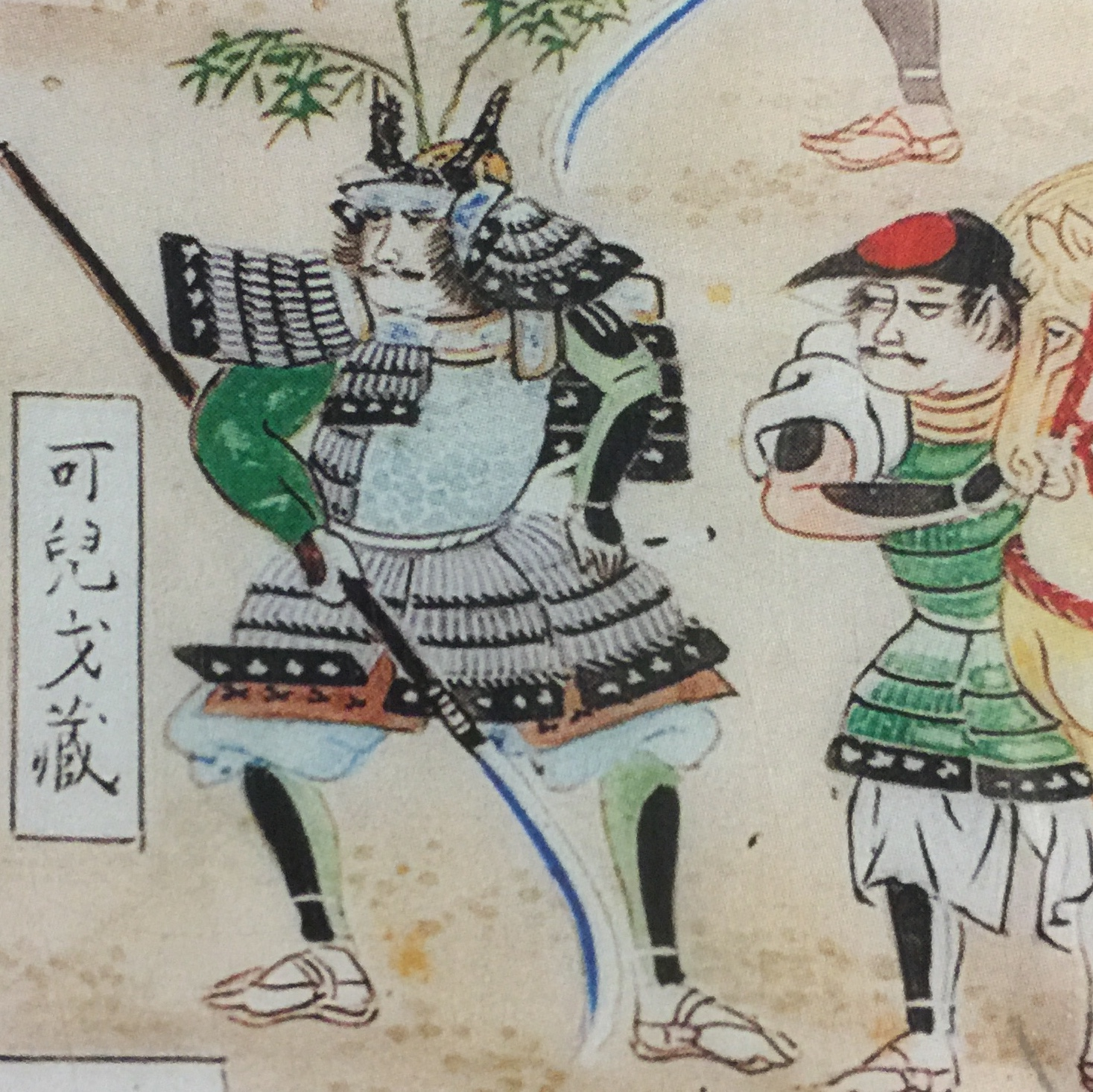
- Saizō in the battle of Sekigahara folding screen
- Born: 1554
- Died: 24 June 1613 (aged 58–59)
- Resting place: Saizoji Temple in Hiroshima City, Hiroshima Prefecture
- Other name: Bamboo Saizō
- Occupation: Samurai
- Employers: Tokugawa clan; Saitō clan; Oda clan
- Known for: Head collection during the Battle of Sekigahara
- Children: Kagemune Yamaoka (山岡景宗) (adopted)
- Relatives: Sakubei Saizō (才蔵、作兵衛) (brother)

Kani Saizō (可児才蔵; 1554–1613), also known as Kani Yoshinaga (可児吉長), was a Japanese samurai of the late Sengoku era through early Edo era, who served various lords before coming into the service of the Tokugawa clan. Saizō was originally a junior retainer under the Saitō clan, then switched to the Oda clan. Still later, he served under the Tokugawa. In the early Edo era, Saizō joined Fukushima Masanori during the latter's move to the Hiroshima Domain, and died in 1613.

== Career ==
In 1600, Kani Saizō participated in the Battle of Sekigahara as the forerunner of Fukushima Masanori's army. In the outpost battle of Gifu Castle, he took the heads of 17 enemy soldiers, and was greatly praised by Tokugawa Ieyasu. He fought with a bamboo stalk on his back and would mark the heads of his defeated enemies by putting bamboo leaves in their cut necks or mouths, since he could not carry every head. Thus he gained the nickname Bamboo Saizo (Sasa Saizō).
