= Battle of Azukizaka (1542) =

Battle of 1542 in which Oda Nobuhide defeated Imagawa Yoshimoto

First Battle of Azukizaka
- Part of the Sengoku period
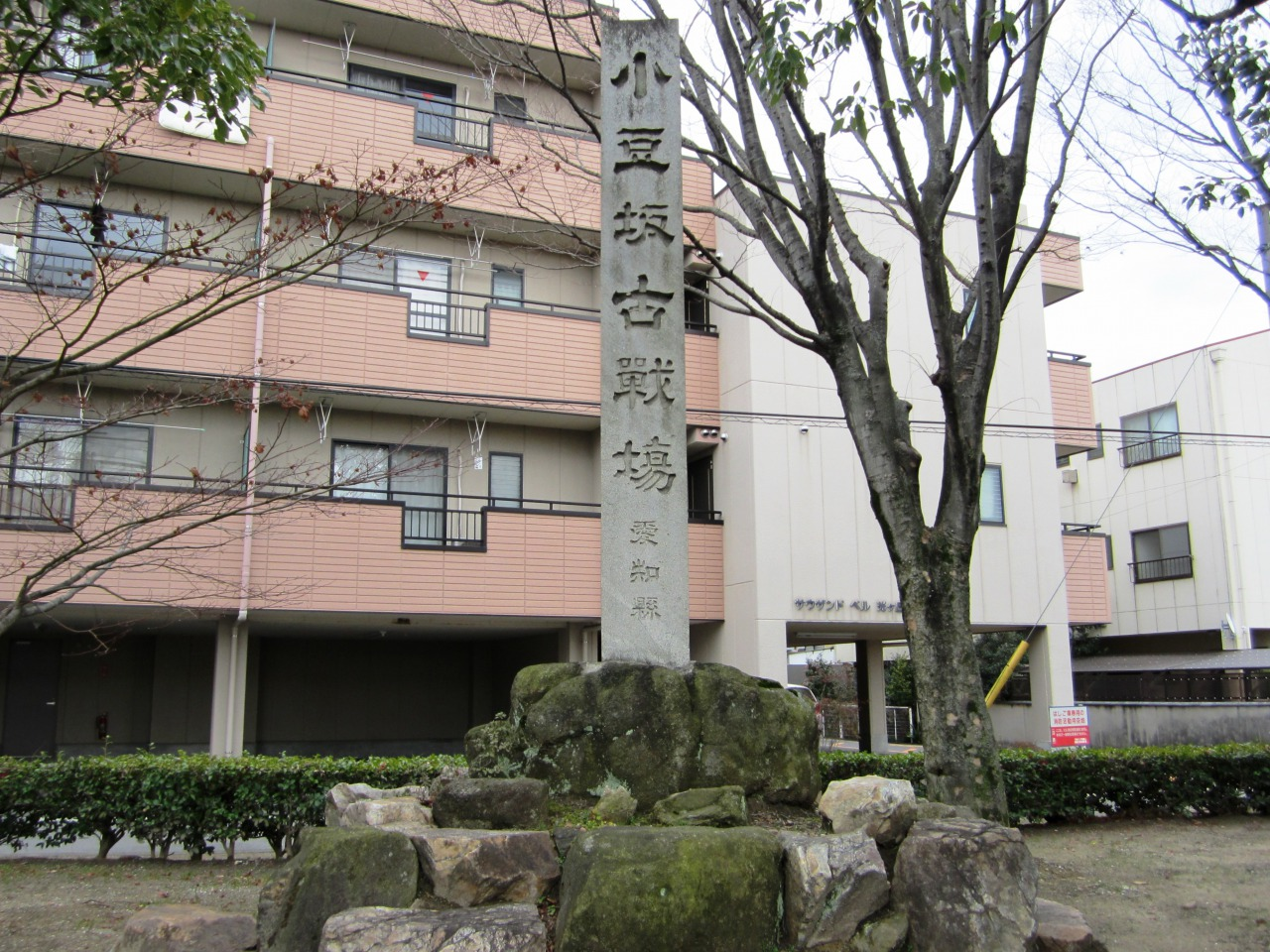
- Site of the Battle of Azukizaka
Date	1542
Location	Azukizaka, Mikawa Province 34°55′49″N 137°10′42″E
Result	Oda victory

Belligerents
Imagawa clan Matsudaira clan	Oda clan

Commanders and leaders
Imagawa Yoshimoto; Imagawa Sessai; Matsudaira Hirotada	Oda Nobuhide; Oda Nobuyasu; Oda Nobuzane; Kawajiri Hidetaka
- Location within Japan

In the First Battle of Azukizaka (小豆坂の戦い, Azukizaka no tatakai) Oda Nobuhide defeated Imagawa Yoshimoto, setting the stage for his son, Oda Nobunaga, to become one of Japan's greatest warlords. Despite the defeat, later in 1548, Yoshimoto defeated Nobuhide in the Second Battle of Azukizaka and continued to expand his territory until 1560, when he faced Nobunaga and was killed in the Battle of Okehazama.

In response to Oda moves into Western Mikawa, Imagawa Yoshimoto moved forces into Ikutahara in the 8th month of 1542. Oda Nobuhide responded to this by leaving his position at Anjô castle and crossing the Yahagi river taking up a position at Kamiwada, and in the 10th month, engaged in battle at Azukizaka, southeast of Okazaki castle.

The Imagawa vanguard was led by a warrior by the name of Yuhara of Suruga. Nobuhide was joined by his brothers Nobuyasu, Nobumitsu, and Nobuzane. The battle was quickly won by the Oda side, with credit given to seven Samurai, known as the "Seven Spears of Azukizaka". Kawajiri Hidetaka fought with Yuhara (由原), who was the forerunner of the Imagawa clan, and defeated him at the battle's end.

== Oda's "Seven Spears of Azukizaka" ==
During the First Battle of Azukizaka in 1542, seven of Oda Nobuhide's men so distinguished themselves they became known as the "Seven Spears of Azukizaka" (小豆坂七本槍). The seven Samurai were,

- Oda Nobumitsu
- Oda Nobufusa
- Okada Shigeyoshi
- Sassa Masatsugu
- Sassa Magosuke
- Nakano Shigeyoshi
- Shimokata Sadakiyo

== See also ==
- Battle of Azukizaka (1564)
