= Furuwatari Castle =

Former Japanese castle in Nagoya

Coordinates: 35°9′8.09″N 136°54′7.05″E

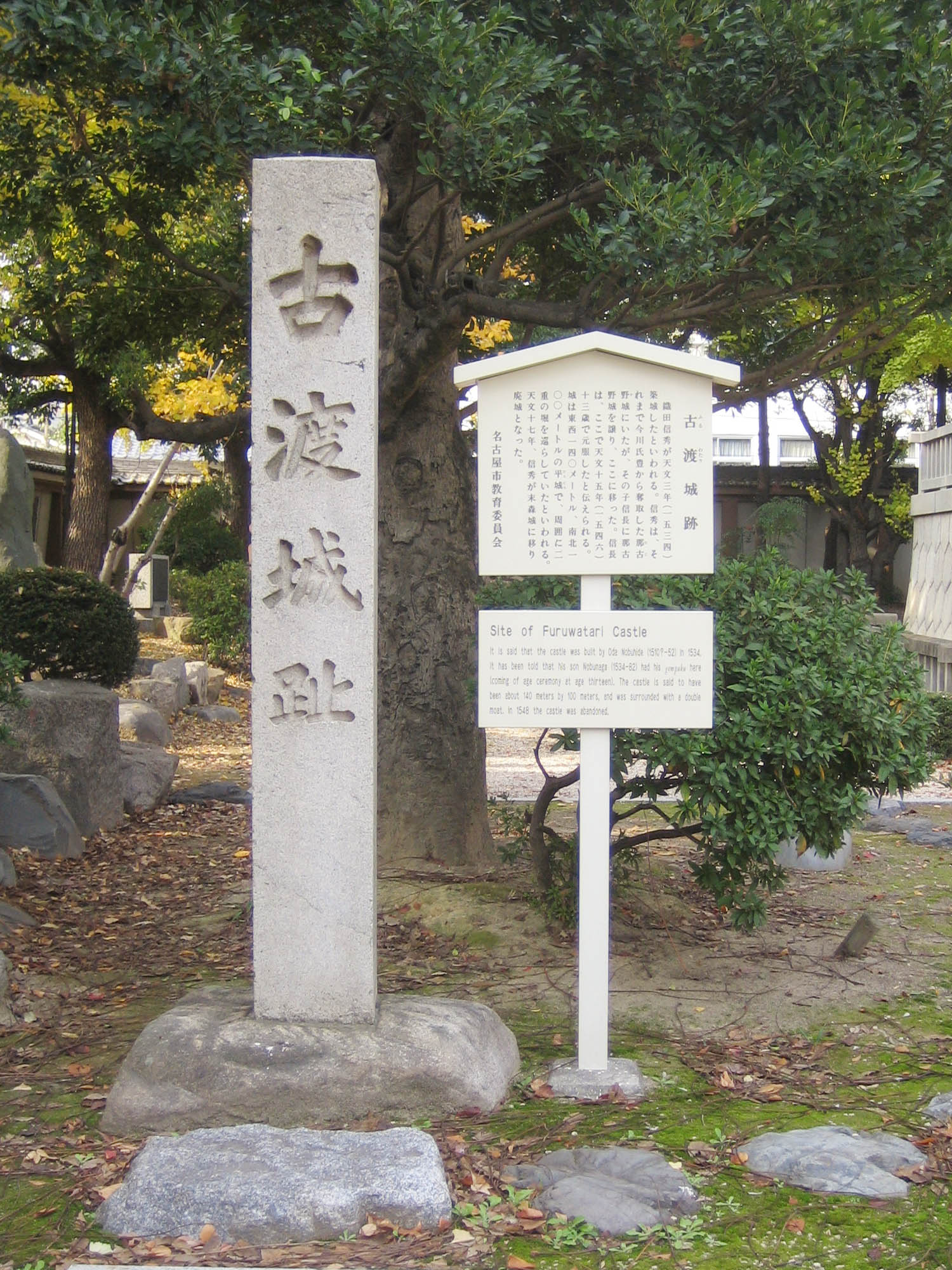
Site of Furuwatari Castle

Furuwatari Castle (古渡城, Furuwatari-jō) is a former Japanese castle located in Nagoya.

== History ==
It was originally outside the city of Nagoya in the countryside of the Owari Province. The castle was apparently originally constructed by Lord Oda Nobuhide (1508-1549) in 1534. According to legend his son Oda Nobunaga (1534-1582) had his genpuku (coming of age ceremony at age 13) heUnit conversionre. The castle is said to have been about 140 by 100 metres (460 by 330 ft), and was surrounded by a double moat. The castle was abandoned in 1548 and fell into ruins. A stone stelae marks the site of the castle. On parts of the ground the Higashi Honganji Nagoya Betsuin was constructed in the 18th and 19th century.
