= Aochi Shigetsuna =

Japanese samurai

Aochi Shigetsuna (青地 茂綱, d. 19 October 1570) was a samurai retainer beneath the clan of Oda throughout the latter Sengoku period of Feudal Japan. Shigetsuna was the legitimate second son of Gamō Sadahide and was later adopted by Aochi Nagatsuna, a daimyō who held residence in the Kurita District of Ōmi Province. Around the year of 1569 Shigetsuna along with his brother Gamo Katahide would both submit to the prominent Oda Nobunaga. One year following this event Shigetsuna accompanied his new lord in a campaign that would aspire for death to the defiant Asakura of Echizen Province. However, after Azai Nagamasa had initially defected from his allegiance to the Oda in support of the Asakura, who were his mutual allies for many generations, the Oda army was forced into retreat and Shigetsuna would consequently lose his life defending their rear guard.
