= Hayashi clan (Owari) =

Hayashi 林
- Home province: Owari

The Hayashi clan (林氏, Hayashi-shi) was a Japanese samurai clan which served as retainers to the Oda clan based in Owari.

The Hayashi were descendants of the Inaba clan, and it is said that they changed their family name to 'Hayashi' in the generation of Inaba Michimura. The Inaba are descending from Kōno Michitaka (died 1374), who descend from Emperor Kanmu (736–805).

One famous figure, Hayashi Hidesada, was a senior retainer of Oda Nobunaga. The family originated in the village of Oki Village in the Kasugai District of Owari Province. In the Edo period, the family became retainers of the Owari Domain.

== Notable figures ==
- Hayashi Hidesada
- Hayashi Michitomo (林通具)
- Hayashi Michimasa (林通政)
