= Battle of Okehazama =

1560 Japanese battle won by Oda Nobunaga

Coordinates: 35°03′01″N 136°59′48″E

- Part of the Sengoku period
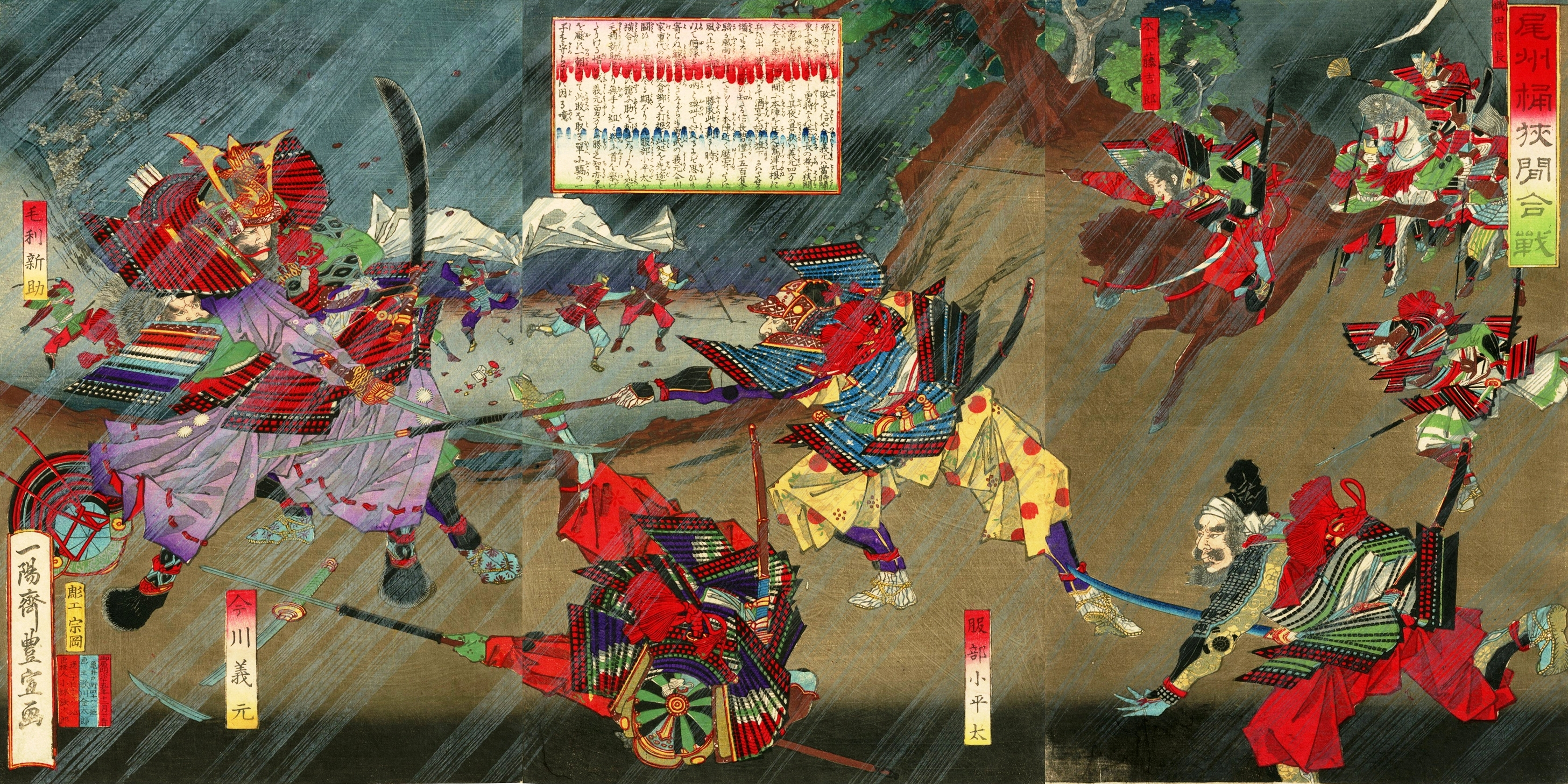
- Ukiyo-e of the Battle of Okehazama by Utagawa Toyonobu
Date	12 June 1560
Location	Dengaku-hazama, Toyoake, Owari Province, Japan
Result	Oda clan victory: Survival of the Oda clan
Territorial changes	Imagawa threat to Owari Province removed

Belligerents
Imagawa clan Matsudaira clan	Oda clan

Commanders and leaders
Imagawa Yoshimoto †; Matsui Munenobu †; Iio Noritsura †; Ii Naomori †; Okabe Motonobu; Udono Nagateru	Oda Nobunaga; Sakuma Nobumori; Ikeda Tsuneoki; Kawajiri Hidetaka; Sassa Masatsugu †

Strength
25,000	2,000–3,000
- Location within Aichi Prefecture Battle of Okehazama (Japan)

The Battle of Okehazama (桶狭間の戦い, Okehazama-no-tatakai) took place on 12 June 1560 in Owari Province, in today's Aichi Prefecture. In this battle, the heavily outnumbered Oda clan troops, commanded by Oda Nobunaga, defeated Imagawa Yoshimoto and established Oda as one of the front-running warlords in the Sengoku period.

== Background ==
In 1560, Imagawa Yoshimoto, a powerful warlord who controlled Suruga, Tōtōmi, and Mikawa Provinces amassed an army of 25,000 men to march on Kyoto to challenge the increasingly weak and ineffective Ashikaga shogunate for control of the country. The army followed the route of the Tōkaidō highway, and crossed from Mikawa into Owari Province, which had recently been united by the local warlord Oda Nobunaga.

== Prelude ==
The 25,000 Imagawa forces quickly overran Oda's border fortresses of Washizu, Matsudaira forces led by Matsudaira Motoyasu took Marune fortress, and Yoshimoto set up camp at Dengaku-hazama, located in the village of Okehazama, just outside of what is now the city of Nagoya. In opposition, Oda Nobunaga could field only about 2,000-3,000 men, or roughly one-tenth of the Imagawa army. Although some of his staff recommended withdrawing to the Oda stronghold of Kiyosu Castle, Nobunaga was aware that Kiyosu would not be able to withstand a siege. He instead stated that "only a strong offensive policy could make up for the superior numbers of the enemy" and ordered a counterattack. The geography of the area in which the Imagawa set up their camp was well known to Nobunaga and his scouts, as they had often used the area for war games in the guise of falconry hunts.

The evening before the attack, Nobunaga gathered his men and told them that to wait would be suicide and that it be best to attack the enemy head on, before sending them home to rest. He awoke early next morning and dressed. He recited a passage from the song "Atsumori" and intoned, "Man has but 50 years, and life is but a dream." He donned his armor, wolfed down a bowl of rice porridge while he was still standing, and departed.

== Battle ==
Nobunaga led his men in person from Kiyosu via Atsuta Shrine to a fortified temple called Zenshō-ji, a short distance away from Okehazama, on the other side of the Tōkaidō road.

To misdirect any Imagawa scouts, Nobunaga ordered his men to set up numerous flags and banners around the Zenshō-ji to give the appearance of a much larger force.

The actual sequence of events of the Battle of Okehazama has been much embellished by legend and is historically unclear. Traditionally it has been held that the vast discrepancy in numbers caused Nobunaga and his men on June 12 to secrete themselves in an area known as Kamagatani on the other side of the Imagawa main camp, and the Oda forces made a flanking maneuver and attacked the Imagawa army at Dengaku-hazama from the north. However, familiarity of the Oda forces with the terrain and Nobunaga's propensity for aggressive tactics make many modern historians theorize that the attack was actually a frontal assault on Yoshimoto's camp, either by design or by accident.

In any event, the Imagawa army was caught by surprise. The Imagawa were celebrating their recent easy victories, and as the afternoon was very hot, many had removed their armor. Using a thunderstorm to mask their movements, the Oda troops struck hard at the heart of the Imagawa camp, which was in a narrow valley. The surprise attack caused a panic and the Imagawa troops broke ranks and many attempted to flee.

Imagawa Yoshimoto, unaware of what was transpiring, heard the noise and emerged from his tent shouting at his men to quit their drunken revelry and return to their posts. By the time he realized, moments later, that the samurai before him were not his own, it was too late to organize a defense. Yoshimoto was not, as is popularly believed, killed in his war camp. Yoshimoto and his men quickly abandoned their camp and fled to the fighting that was taking place.

Yoshimoto was attacked by Mōri Shinsuke and Hattori Koheita. Yoshimoto, Munenobu, and Naomori engaged them in melee and parried their initial attack. Yoshimoto is said to have fought off one attack by the spear wielding Mori Shinsuke, cutting through the Oda samurai's spear, and into the man's knee. He was then tackled by a second Oda samurai, Hattori Koheita, who promptly took the general's head.

With their leader and all but two of the senior officers killed, the remaining Imagawa troops either surrendered or fled.

== Aftermath ==
The Battle of Okehazama is regarded as one of the most significant turning points in Japanese history. The Imagawa clan was greatly weakened and would soon be destroyed by its neighbors. Oda Nobunaga gained greatly in prestige, and many samurai and minor warlords (including Imagawa's former retainer, Matsudaira Motoyasu, the future Tokugawa Ieyasu) pledged fealty.

The battle was the first time Nobunaga noticed the talents of the sandal-bearer Kinoshita Tōkichirō, who would eventually become Toyotomi Hideyoshi.

== National Historic Site ==
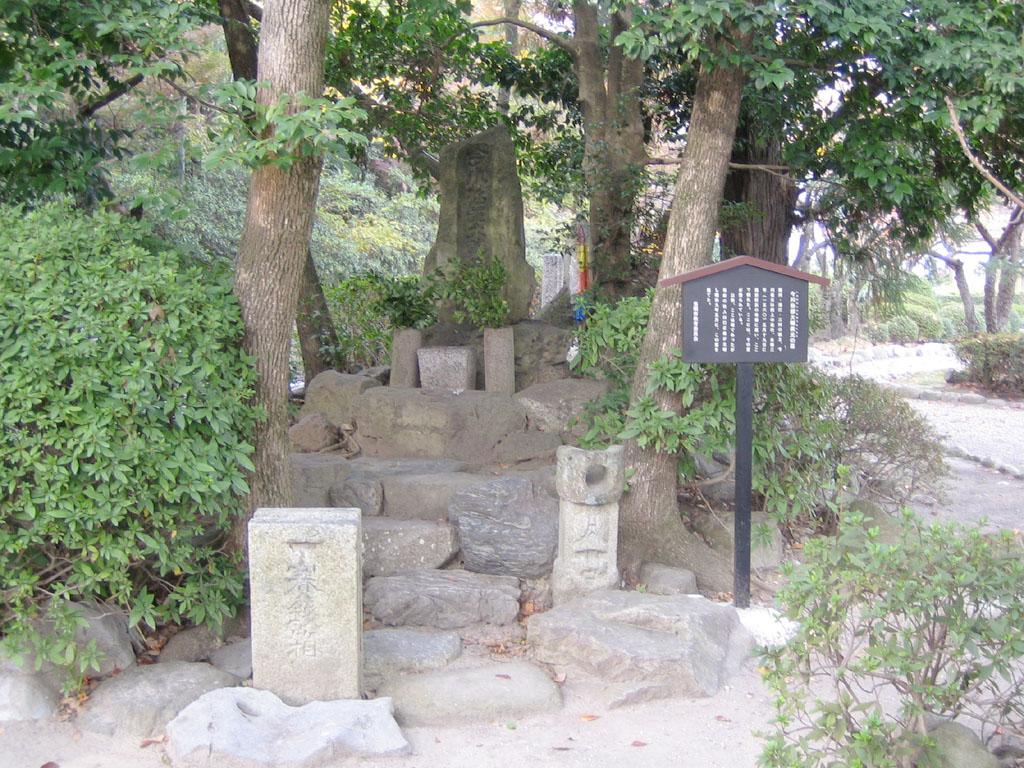
The grave of Imagawa Yoshimoto near the site of the battle.

In 1937, Japan's Ministry of Education designated the battlefield, Okehazama Kosenjō, a National Historic Site of Japan. Located at Minamiyakata, Sakae-cho, Toyoake City, the site hosts The Shichikokuhyo, or Seven Granite Pillars, with each pillar representing Yoshimoto's seven warlords. The first of the pillars bears the words, "Imagawa Yoshimoto was killed here."

The battlefield is now a park.
