= Shugodai =

Officials of feudal Japan

Shugodai (守護代, shugodai) were officials during feudal Japan. Shugodai were representatives of provincial shugo when the shugo could not virtually exercise his power, being often away from his province. Unlike shugo, who were appointed from the central power of the samurai estate or Shogunate, shugodai were locally appointed.

At the brink of the Sengoku period, most shugo strengthened their grip on power, leading to the effective disappearance of their shugodai. However, taking advantage of the weakening of their Shugo due to war or other circumstances, some shugodai became the effective lords of their provinces. A typical example of shugodai becoming de facto daimyōs would be Oda Nobuhide, the Oda clan of Owari Province.

== Notable Shugodai clans ==
- Oda clan
- Asakura clan
- Nagao clan
- Miyoshi clan
- Amago clan
- Saitō clan
- Jinbō clan
- Daikan
