= Suemori Castle =

Castle in Nagoya, Aichi Prefecture, Japan

Coordinates: 35°09′51.90″N 136°57′25.03″E

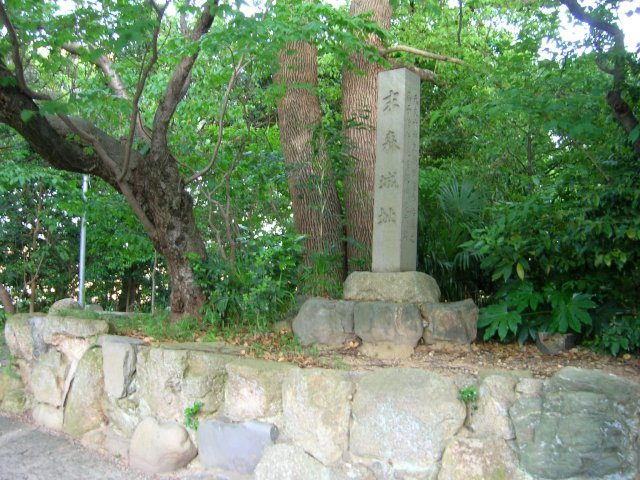
Site of Suemori Castle

Suemori Castle (末森城, Suemori-jō) is a former Japanese castle located in Nagoya. It was originally outside the city of Nagoya in the countryside of the Owari Province.

Lord Oda Nobuhide (1508-1549), relocating out of Furuto Castle to evade the advance of Imagawa Yoshimoto into Mikawa Province, built Suemori castle in 1547. Nobuhide's third son Oda Nobuyuki (d. 1557) became the castle's lord after Nobuhide's death. Nobyuki was defeated at the Battle of Inogahara, where he fought against his older brother Oda Nobunaga (1534-1582). The castle was abandoned shortly after the death of Nobuyuki.

The castle is located on steep cliffs 44 meters above sea level. The castle is surrounded by dry moats approximately 7 to 8 meters deep.

The Shiroyama Hachiman-gū shrine is located on the grounds of the castle.
