= Hirate Masahide =

Japanese samurai in service of the Oda Clan (1492-1553)

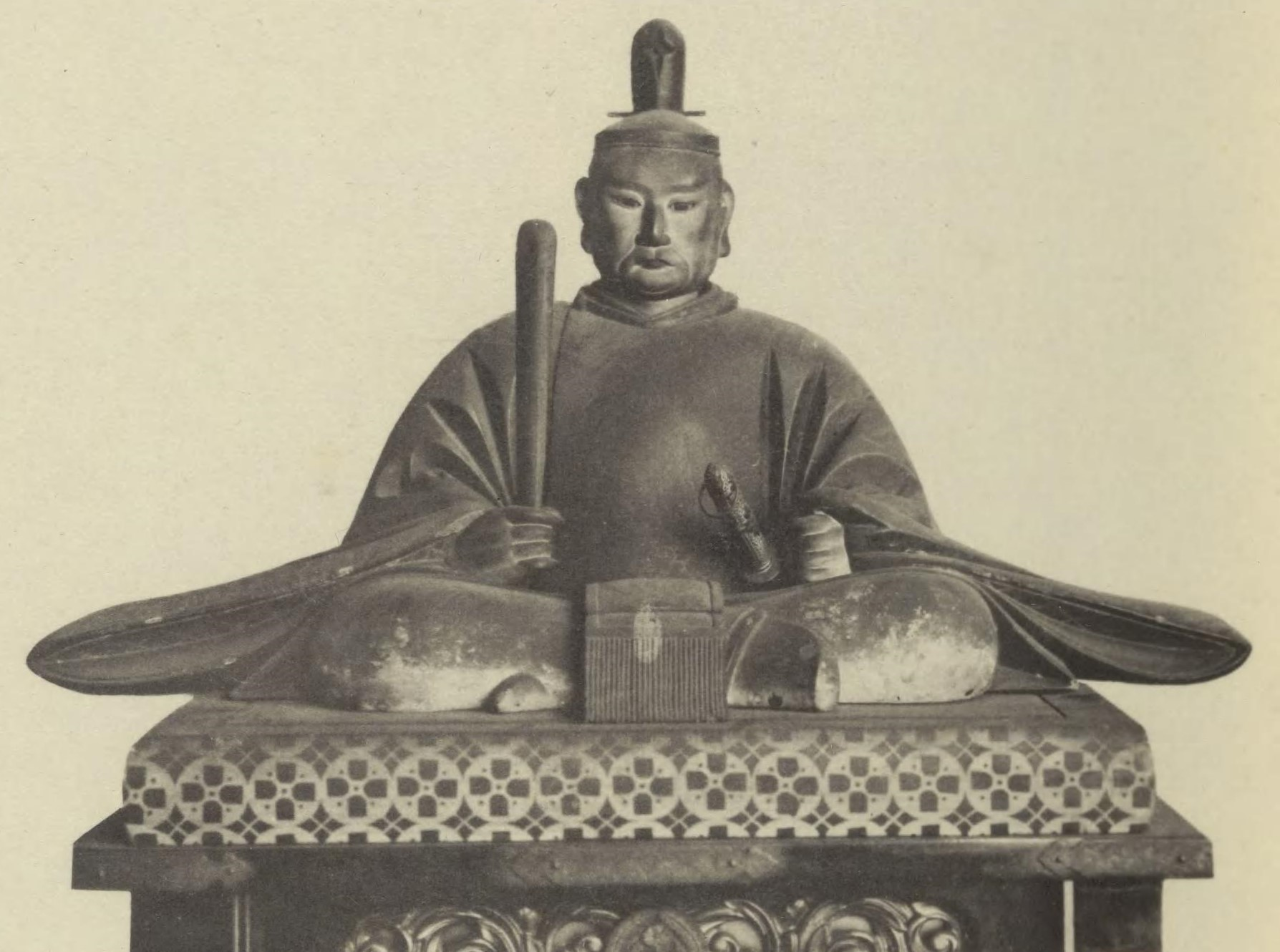
Statue of Hirate Masahide at Seishū-ji, Nagoya

Hirate Masahide (平手 政秀; June 4, 1492 – February 25, 1553) was a Japanese samurai who served the Oda clan for two generations. His original name was Hirate Kiyohide (平手 清秀).

== Life ==
Masahide first served Oda Nobuhide and then become one of the Four karōs that helped Oda Nobunaga in his early life. He was a talented samurai as well as skilled in sado and waka. This helped him to act as a skilled diplomat, dealing with the Ashikaga shogunate and deputies of the emperor. In 1533, a well-known regent Yamashina Tokitsugu visited Owari Province, the domain of the Oda clan. Finding the reception prepared by Masahide superb, Tokitsugu praised Masahide's knowledge highly. Other signs of his importance as a diplomat can be found in the fact that he paid a visit to Kyoto in the name of Nobuhide to offer the funds needed to repair the Emperor's residence.

When Nobuhide's son Nobunaga was born in 1534, Masahide became the second highest ranking Karō as well as the tutor of the newborn heir. In 1547 Nobunaga finished his coming-of-age ceremony, and on the occasion of his first battle, Masahide served beside him. The next year, he exerted himself to establish peace between Nobuhide and his agelong rival Saitō Dōsan of Mino Province, and to arrange the marriage between Nobunaga and Dōsan's daughter Nōhime. This move made it possible for the Oda clan to concentrate on the fight against the Imagawa clan.

Masahide served the Oda family faithfully in many ways, but he was also deeply troubled by Nobunaga's eccentricity. After Nobuhide's death, discord in the clan increased and so did Masahide's concern about the future of his master.

In 1553, Masahide committed kanshi ("remonstration death") to startle Nobunaga into his obligations.
