= Oda Nobuyuki =

Military commander of Japan's Sengoku period

- 織田 信行

Lord of Suemori Castle
- In office 1549–1557

Personal details
- Born: 1536
- Died: 1558 (aged 21–22)
- Parents: Oda Nobuhide (father); Dota Gozen (mother)

Military service
- Allegiance: Oda clan
- Battles/wars: Battle of Ino

Oda Nobuyuki (織田 信行; 1536 – 1558), also known as Oda Nobukatsu (織田 信勝), was the son of Oda Nobuhide and younger brother of Oda Nobunaga, who lived during the Sengoku period of Japan.

Nobuyuki conspired against his brother Nobunaga with the Hayashi clan (Owari), which Nobunaga viewed as treason. Nobuyuki's Suemori Castle was reduced by Ikeda Nobuteru. Nobuyuki was pardoned, however in 1558 it was discovered that he had been planning yet another revolt and Nobuyuki was executed.

== First Rebellion (1556) ==
Following the death of Oda Nobuhide in 1552, Oda Nobunaga succeeded him as head of their branch of the Oda Clan. Nobuyuki was granted Suemori Castle and assigned several retainers, including Shibata Katsuie. At their father's funeral, Nobunaga's disregard for customary formalities attracted criticism from members of the Oda family, some of whom questioned his ability to rule. Nobuyuki, by contrast, observed the expected formalities.

Tensions between the brothers increased in the following years. Following the killing of their younger brother, Oda Hidetaka, by a retainer of Oda Nobutsugu, Nobuyuki marched from Suemori Castle to Moriyama and burned the town's residential quarters. Nobunaga subsequently criticized his brother's actions.

By 1556, Nobuyuki had gained the support of several retainers opposed to Nobunaga, including Shibata Katsuie and the brothers, Hayashi Hidesada and Hayashi Mimasaka no Kami. The Hayashi brothers began hostilities against Nobunaga, while their forces disrupted communications between Atsuta and Kiyosu. Nobuyuki seized the Three Hamlets of Shinoki, which belonged to Nobunaga's domain. In response, Nobunaga ordered the construction of fortifications at Nazuka across the Odai River.

On the 24th day of the eighth month of 1556, the opposing forces clashed at the Battle of Ino. Nobunaga's army, reportedly numbering approximately 700 men, defeated a larger force of around 1,700 led by Shibata Katsuie and Hayashi Mimasaka no Kami. Shibata was wounded during the battle, while Hayashi Mimasaka no Kami was killed.

Following the defeat, Nobunaga beseiged Nagoya and Suemori castles. The mother of Oda Nobunaga and Nobuyuki resided with Nobuyuki at Suemori Castle. She intervened on Nobuyuki's behalf and sent envoys to negotiate with Nobunaga. Nobunaga subsequently pardoned his brother and several retainers involved in the rebellion.

== Second Rebellion & Death ==
Following his pardon, Nobuyuki made preparations for another rebellion against Nobunaga. He fortified Ryūsenji Temple and formed an alliance with Oda Nobukata of Iwakura, intending to invade the Three Villages of Shinoki, which formed part of Nobunaga's domain.

Shibata Katsuie, who had previously supported Nobuyuki, informed Nobunaga of the planned rebellion after being slighted by Tsuzuki Kurando, an influential member of Nobuyuki's household. Upon learning of the plot, Nobynaga feigned illness and withdrew from public view. At the urging of their mother and Shibata, Nobuyuki visited Nobunaga at Kiyosu Castle.

Nobuyuki was killed in an antechamber of Kiyosu Castle on Nobunaga's orders by Kawajiri Hidetaka and Aokai.

== Family ==
- Father: Oda Nobuhide (1510–1551)
- Mother: Tsuchida Gozen (died 1594)
- Brothers:
  - Oda Nobunaga (1534–1582)
  - Oda Nagamasu (1548–1622)
  - Oda Nobukane (1548–1614)
  - Oda Nobuharu (1549–1570)
  - Oda Nobuoki
  - Oda Hidetaka
  - Oda Hidenari
  - Oda Nobuteru
  - Oda Nagatoshi
- Sisters:
  - Oichi (1547–1583)
  - Oinu
- Half Brothers:
  - Oda Nobuhiro (died 1574)
  - Oda Nobutoki (died 1556)
- Sons:
  - Tsuda Nobuzumi (1555–1583)
  - Tsuda Nobutada (Ja:津田 信糺) (1555–1633)
  - Oda Nobukane (Ja:織田信兼) (d.1583) Not to be confused with Oda Nobukane 織田信包
