= Oda Nobuhide =

Japanese daimyō and magistrate (1510–1551)

- 織田 信秀
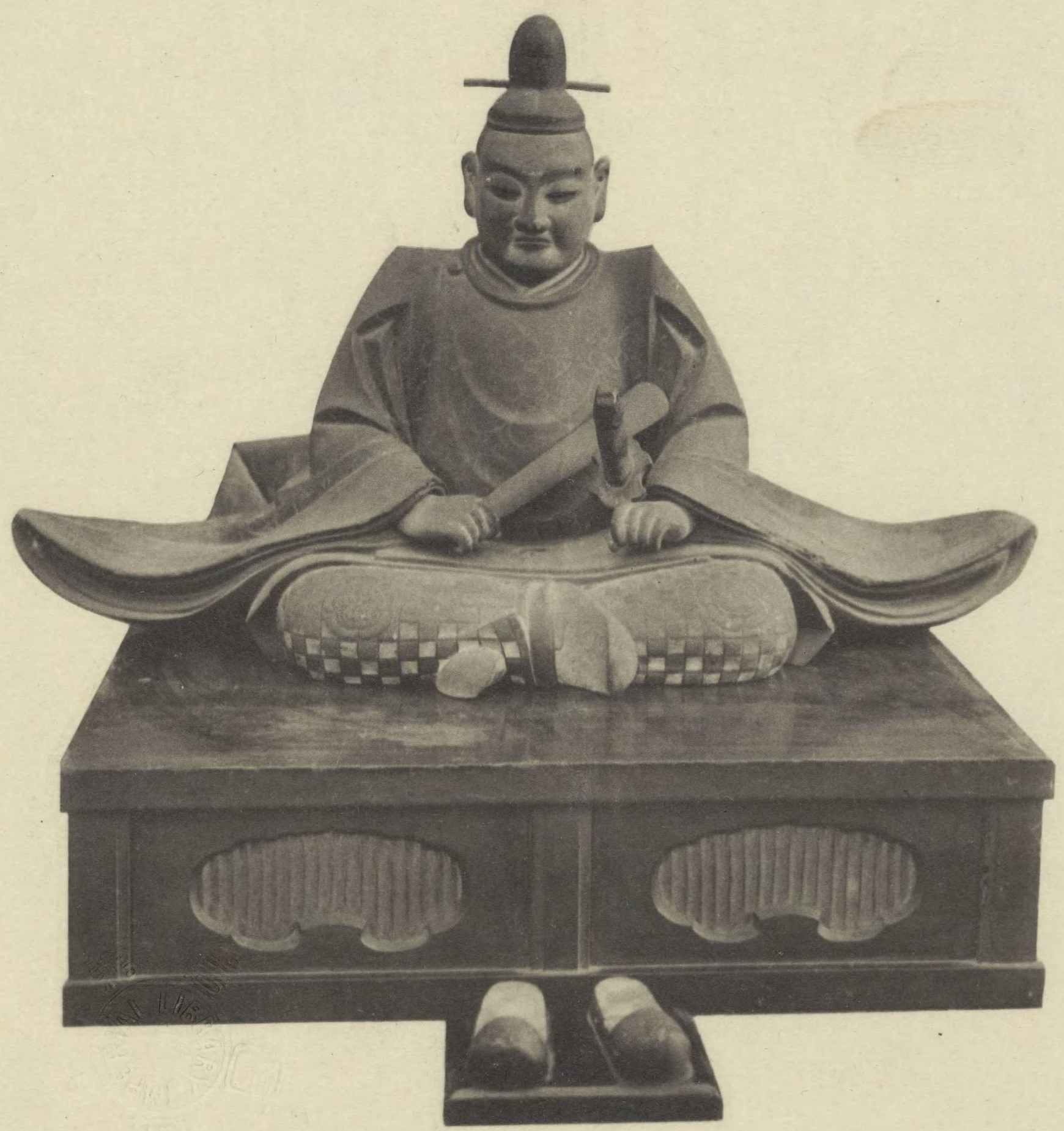
- Statue of Oda Nobuhide at Banshō-ji

Head of Danjō no Jō Oda clan
- In office 1538–1551
- Preceded by: Oda Nobusada
- Succeeded by: Oda Nobunaga

Personal details
- Born: 1510 Owari Province, Japan
- Died: 8 April 1551 (aged 40–41) Ōsu Kannon, Nagoya
- Spouse: Tsuchida Gozen
- Children: See Family
- Parents: Oda Nobusada (father); Ganshoin-dono (mother)
- Relatives: Oda Nobuyasu (brother); Oda Nobumitsu (brother); Oda Nobutsugu (brother); Oda Nobuzane (brother); Lady Otsuya (sister)
- Nickname(s): "Tiger of Owari" (尾張の虎) "Bingo no Kami" (備後守)

Military service
- Allegiance: Oda clan
- Rank: Daimyo; Shugodai of Mikawa Province; Bugyo of Owari Province
- Unit: Oda clan
- Commands: Shobata Castle (1527); Nagoya Castle (1532); Furuwatari Castle (1536); Suemori Castle (1548)
- Battles/wars: Siege of Anjō castle (1540); Battle of Azukizaka (1542); Battle of Kanōguchi (1547); Battle of Azukizaka (1548)

Oda Nobuhide (織田 信秀; 1510 – 8 April 1551) was a Japanese daimyō and magistrate of the Sengoku period known as "Tiger of Owari" and also the father of Oda Nobunaga, the first "Great Unifier" of Japan. Nobuhide was a deputy shugo (Shugodai) of lower Owari Province and head of the Oda clan which controlled most of Owari.

== Biography ==
Oda Nobuhide was born in 1510 in Owari Province, the eldest son of Oda Nobusada, the head of the Oda clan and a shugodai (deputy shugo) of the lower Owari area. Nobuhide became head of the Oda clan when Nobusada died in 1538, and became involved in open warfare as he was confronted to the north by Saitō Dōsan, the daimyō of Mino Province, and to the east by Imagawa Yoshimoto, the daimyō of Mikawa, Suruga, and Tōtōmi provinces.

At certain year, Nobuhide invaded and besiege Ida castle in Mikawa. Sakai Tadatsugu and Naitō Nobunari were reportedly sallied out fighting Nobuhide's army to defend the castle.

In 1540, Nobuhide attacked and took Anjō castle, which was held by the Matsudaira clan. He was assisted by Mizuno Tadamasa, his son, Oda Nobuhiro, was installed as the lord of the castle.

In 1542, he defeated Imagawa Yoshimoto at First Battle of Azukizaka. Nobuhide managed to hold his own against his opponents, but was never able to fully unite Owari due to constant internal struggles within Oda clan, which prevented him from achieving a complete victory.

In 1543, he donated 4000 kan (the currency of Japan at that time) to the Imperial Court in Kyoto for the repair expenses of the Imperial Palace, while Imagawa Yoshimoto's donation was 500 kan. With such financial resources, the Oda clan came to possess more power than the Shiba clan (Shugo of Owari). Nobuhide's economic policies were steadily passed down to his son and heir, Nobunaga.

In 1547, Nobuhide was defeated at the Battle of Kanōguchi by Saitō Dōsan.

In 1548, Imagawa defeated Nobuhide in the Second Battle of Azukizaka and continued to expand his territory until 1560.

In 1549, Nobuhide made peace with Dōsan by arranging a political marriage between his eldest son, Oda Nobunaga, and Saitō Dōsan's daughter, Nōhime. Dōsan supported the marriage which allowed Nobuhide to focus on facing Yoshimoto. In one of his moments of glory, Nobuhide managed to capture Matsudaira Hirotada's son and heir, Matsudaira Motoyasu (later known as Tokugawa Ieyasu) as a hostage, to en route Yoshimoto and was thus able to gain some footholds into Mikawa.

Nobuhide died unexpectedly in 1551, and his remains are interred in a little-known alley near Osu Kannon temple in Nagoya.

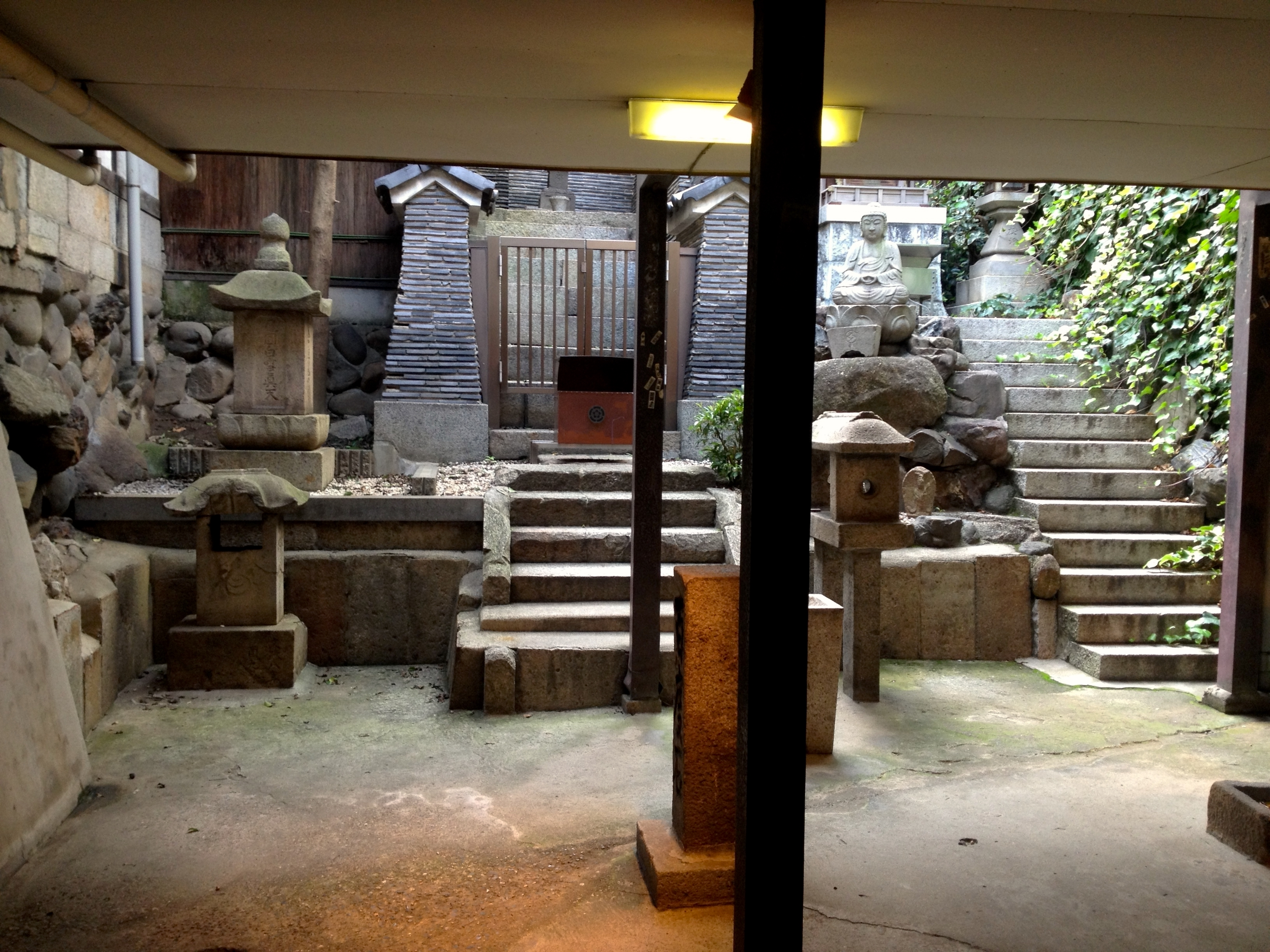
Grave of Oda Nobuhide in Bansho-ji

== Succession controversy ==
Nobuhide's eldest son, Oda Nobuhiro, was illegitimate. Therefore, Nobuhide designated his eldest legitimate son, Nobunaga, to succeed him as the head of the Oda clan and its small domain. Nobunaga, who hardly knew his father and already had a bad reputation as a delinquent in Owari, arrived inappropriately dressed at Nobuhide's funeral and threw incense at the altar of the temple as he cursed his fate. Nobunaga's behavior and reputation resulted in almost all support that Nobuhide's retainers would have given him to disappear. Almost all Oda retainers and Nobunaga's mother Tsuchida Gozen favored his younger brother, Oda Nobuyuki, who was considered to be well-behaved and reputable. As a result, Nobunaga was left with support from Hirate Masahide and his father-in-law Saitō Dōsan, whom he had never met before, and a succession crisis. Many of Nobuhide's relatives and retainers attempted to usurp his heir, and it would take seven years for Nobunaga to consolidate his power within the Oda clan and finally unite Owari Province. Nobunaga eventually conquered most of Japan, beginning his campaign in Owari, and became known as the first of the three "Great Unifiers" of the Sengoku period.

== Notable retainers ==
- Hirate Masahide
- Hayashi Hidesada
- Murai Sadakatsu
- Kawajiri Hidetaka
- Sakuma Nobumori

== Family ==
- Father: Oda Nobusada
- Brothers:
  - Oda Nobuyasu
  - Oda Nobumitsu (1516–1556)
  - Oda Nobutsugu
  - Oda Nobuzane
- Sister: Lady Otsuya
- Wife: Tsuchida Gozen (1511-1594), who gave birth to four of his sons (Nobunaga, Nobuyuki, Nobukane and Oda Hidetaka).
- Sons:
  - Oda Nobuhiro (died 1574) (illegitimate oldest son)
  - Oda Nobunaga (1534–1582)
  - Oda Nobuyuki (1536–1557)
  - Oda Nobukane (1548–1614)
  - Oda Nagamasu (1548–1622)
  - Oda Nobuharu (1549–1570)
  - Oda Nobutoki (died 1556)
  - Oda Nobuoki
  - Oda Hidetaka (died 1555)
  - Oda Hidenari
  - Oda Nobuteru
  - Oda Nagatoshi
- Daughters:
  - Oichi (1547–1583)
  - Oinu, married Saji Nobutaka and mother of Saji Kazunari
