= Oda clan =

Medieval Japanese clan

Oda 織田
- The emblem (mon) of the Oda clan
- Home province: Echizen; Owari
- Parent house: Taira clan (claimed); Fujiwara clan (claimed); Inbe clan (most likely)
- Titles: Various
- Founder: Taira no Chikazane (claimed; dubious)
- Final ruler: Oda Nobutoshi
- Founding year: 13th century
- Dissolution: still extant
- Ruled until: 1871, abolition of the han system

The Oda clan (Japanese: 織田氏, Hepburn: Oda-shi) is a Japanese samurai family who were daimyo and an important political force in the unification of Japan in the mid-16th century. Though they reached the peak of their power under Oda Nobunaga and fell soon after, several branches of the family continued as daimyo houses until the Meiji Restoration. After the Meiji Restoration, all four heads of the houses of the clan were appointed viscounts in the new system of hereditary peerage.

== History ==
=== Origins ===
Oda Nobunaga first claimed that the Oda clan was descended from the Fujiwara clan, and later claimed descent from Taira no Sukemori of the Taira clan. According to the official genealogy of the Oda clan, after Taira no Sukemori was killed in the Battle of Dannoura in 1185, Taira no Chikazane, the son of Sukemori and a concubine, was entrusted to a Shinto priest at a Shinto Shrine in Otanosho in the Echizen province. This Chikazane became the founder of the Oda clan.

According to modern theories, there is no evidence that the Oda clan was descended from the Taira clan, and there is a theory that they were actually descended from the Inbe clan, who were Shinto priests in Otanosho. Fujiwara no Nobumasa, an ancestor of Nobunaga, is believed to have been adopted from the Inbe clan by the Fujiwara. One theory as to why Nobunaga came to claim descent from the Taira clan is that he justified his own seizure of power by exploiting the belief at the time that the Minamoto and Taira clans were destined to alternate in power (源平交替思想, Genpei kōtai shisō). In other words, the idea was that the Minamoto clan, the shogun of the Kamakura shogunate, the Hōjō clan, descended from the Taira clan (Shikken of the Kamakura shogunate), the Ashikaga clan, descended from the Minamoto clan (shogun of the Ashikaga shogunate), and the Oda clan, descended from the Taira clan, were destined to seize power in that order.

However, there are theories that question whether the people of that time really believed in this idea, and whether the Hojo clan was really descended from the Taira clan.

=== Independence ===
In the middle of the Muromachi period, the Oda clan served the Shiba clan, Shugo (守護) of Echizen province, and when Shiba Yoshishige was appointed Shugo of Owari province and moved to Owari, the Oda clan followed suit, and Oda Jōshō became a Shugodai (守護代) serving the Shiba clan.

After the Onin War, the Shiba clan split into two factions and began warring, and from around 1466, the Oda clan also split into two factions and began warring, with Iwakura Castle and Kiyosu Castle as their respective strongholds.

After the Onin War, the power of the Shiba clan declined, and in 1513, Oda Tatsusada rebelled against the Shiba clan, but the rebellion failed and he was killed. then, Oda Nobutomo increased his power and made the Shiba clan his puppets. During the Tenbun period, Oda Nobuhide overtook the main family and increased his power. In 1538, Nobuhide captured Nagoya Castle and became the most powerful sengoku daimyo in Owari Province.

=== Nobunaga's reign ===
Oda Nobuhide took Nagoya Castle in 1538 (it was given to Nobunaga in 1542), and built Furuwatari Castle. Oda Nobutomo held Kiyosu Castle, but he was besieged and killed in 1555 by his nephew Oda Nobunaga who operated from Nagoya Castle. This led to the family being divided into several branches, until the branch led by Oda Nobunaga eclipsed the others and unified its control over Owari.

Then turning to neighboring rivals, it, one by one achieved dominance over the Imagawa, Saitō, Azai, Asakura, Takeda and other clans, until Nobunaga held control over central Japan. However, Nobunaga's plans for national domination were thwarted when he fell victim to the treachery of his vassal Akechi Mitsuhide who forced Nobunaga into suicide during the Incident at Honnō-ji in the summer of 1582. The Oda remained titular overlords of central Japan for a short time, before being surpassed by the family of one of Nobunaga's chief generals, Hashiba Hideyoshi.

=== Edo period ===
Though the Oda were effectively eclipsed by Toyotomi Hideyoshi following Nobunaga's death, it is not often known that the Oda continued to be a presence in Japanese politics. One branch of the family became hatamoto retainers to the Tokugawa shōgun, while other branches became minor daimyō lords. As of the end of the Edo period, these included Tendō Domain (also known as Takahata Domain, Dewa Province, 20,000 koku), Yanagimoto han (Yamato Province, 10,000 koku), Kaiju han (also known as Shibamura han; Yamato Province, 10,000 koku), and Kaibara han (Tanba Province, 20,000 koku).

During the reign of the daimyō Nobutoshi, the Oda of Tendō Domain were signatories to the pact that created the Ōuetsu Reppan Dōmei.

=== After Meiji Restoration ===
After the Meiji Restoration in 1871, the feudal domains were abolished, and all the four houses of the Oda clan were appointed viscounts in the new hereditary peerage (kazoku).

== Descendants ==
Descendants of the Oda clan can be found throughout Japan, mainly in the south and southwest.

== Notable figures ==
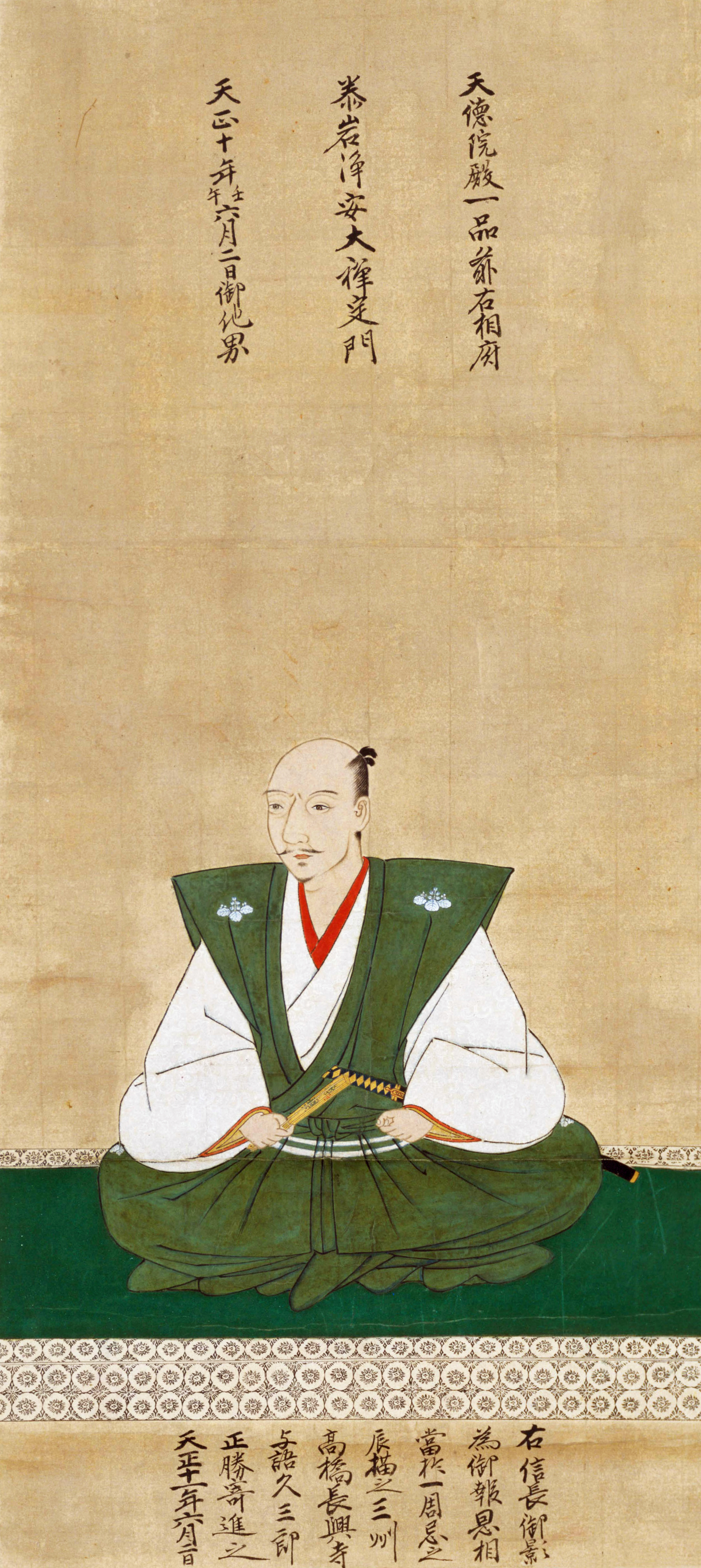
Oda Nobunaga, the most famous member of the Oda clan

- Oda Chikazane (ca. 13th century)
- Oda Nobuhide (1510–1551)
- Oda Nobuhiro (died 1574)
- Oda Nobunaga (1534–1582)
- Oda Nobuyuki (1536–1557)
- Oda Nobukane (1548–1614)
- Oda Nagamasu (1548–1622)
- Oda Nobuharu (1549–1570)
- Oda Nobuzumi (1555–1583)
- Oda Nobutada (1557–1582)
- Oda Nobutaka (1558–1583)
- Oda Nobukatsu (1558–1630)
- Hashiba Hidekatsu (羽柴 秀勝, 1567–1593)
- Oda Katsunaga (1568–1582)
- Oda Hidekatsu (織田 秀雄, 1583–1610)
- Oda Hidenobu (1580–1605)
- Oda Nobutoshi (1853–1901)
- Oda Nobunari (1987–)

=== Notable female members ===
- Oichi (1547–1583)
- Lady Otsuya
- Tokuhime
- Kitsuno
- Nōhime
- Dota Gozen

== Clan retainers ==
Senior retainer families

- Hirate clan
- Takigawa clan
- Sakuma clan
- Fuwa clan
- Hayashi clan
- Shiba clan
- Niwa clan
- Maeda clan
- Sassa clan

Notable retainer families

- Akechi clan
- Mori clan
- Hashiba clan
- Tokugawa clan

=== Nobunaga's notable retainers ===
Senior retainers in Owari Province

- Hirate Masahide
- Hayashi Hidesada
- Murai Sadakatsu
- Kawajiri Hidetaka
- Mizuno Nobumoto
- Sakuma Nobumori
- Shibata Katsuie
- Takigawa Kazumasu
- Mori Yoshinari
- Sakai Masahisa
- Niwa Nagahide
- Ikeda Tsuneoki
- Sassa Narimasa
- Maeda Toshiie
- Toyotomi Hideyoshi
- Hachisuka Masakatsu
- Hori Hidemasa
- Sakuma Morimasa
- Yamauchi Katsutoyo
- Hasegawa Hidekazu
- Naitō Shōsuke
- Harada Naomasa
- Yanada Masatsuna
- Ōta Gyūichi
- Iio Sadamune

Others

- Takenaka Hanbei
- Kuroda Yoshitaka
- Akechi Mitsuhide
- Mori Nagayoshi
- Ujiie Bokuzen
- Inaba Yoshimichi
- Andō Morinari
- Matsunaga Hisahide
- Kuki Yoshitaka
- Kani Saizō
- Kanamori Nagachika
- Gamō Katahide
- Gamō Ujisato
- Mori Ranmaru
- Asakura Kageakira
- Fuwa Mitsuharu
- Araki Murashige
- Hirate Kiyohide
- Hosokawa Fujitaka
- Ikeda Nobuteru
- Ikoma Ienaga
- Maeda Gen'i
- Tokugawa Ieyasu

Others (cont.)

- Murai Sadakatsu
- Nakagawa Kiyohide
- Takayama Ukon
- Tsutsui Junkei
- Wada Koremasa
- Yamauchi Kazutoyo
- Asano Nagamasa
- Hachisuka Hikoemon
- Ishida Mitsunari
- Murai Nagato
- Sakon Shima
- Kuroda Kanbei
- Yamanuchi Katsutoyo
- Horio Mosuke
- Kitabatake Toshikatsu
- Maeno Suemon
- Tōdō Takatora
- Akada Shigeyoshi
- Akada Shigetaka
- Aochi Shigetsuna
- Atagi Nobuyasu
- Chō Tsuratatsu

Others (cont.)

- Endō Taneshige
- Fukutomi Hidekatsu
- Gotō Takaharu
- Hachiya Yoritaka
- Hatakeyama Sadamasa
- Hayashi Shinjiro
- Hirate Norihide
- Horiuchi Ujiyoshi
- Ikai Nobusada
- Inaba Masashige
- Kaganoi Shigemochi
- Kanemitsu Masayoshi
- Katō Yoshiaki
- Kawajiri Hidetaka
- Kotsokuri Tomomasa
- Kyōgoku Takatsugu
- Maeba Yoshitsugu
- Maeda Toshiharu
- Maeno Nagayasu
- Ikoma Chikamasa
- Mikumo Shigemochi
- Yasuke

== Clan castles ==
Castles of Nobunaga's Residence

1. Nagoya Castle
2. Kiyosu Castle
3. Komakiyama Castle
4. Gifu Castle
5. Azuchi Castle

Prominent castles and commanders

- Tamaru Castle : Oda Nobukatsu
- Nagahama Castle : Hashiba Hideyoshi
- Sakamoto Castle : Akechi Mitsuhide
- Fukuchiyama Castle : Akechi clan
- Kameyama Castle : Akechi clan
- Kuroi Castle : Akechi clan (Saitō Toshimitsu)
- Shōryūji Castle : Hosokawa Fujitaka
- Sawayama Castle : Niwa Nagahide
- Maebashi Castle : Takigawa Kazumasu
- Shigisan Castle : Matsunaga Hisahide

Nagoya Castle
