= Owari Province =

Former province of Japan

Map of Japanese provinces (1868) with Owari Province highlighted

Owari Province (尾張国, Owari no Kuni; Japanese pronunciation: [ó̞.β̞ä̀.ɾʲì (nò̞ kɯ̈̀.ɲ̟ì), ò̞.β̞ä́.ɾʲí (nò̞ kɯ̈̀.ɲ̟ì)]) was a province of Japan in the area that today forms the western half of Aichi Prefecture, including the modern city of Nagoya. The province was created in 646. Owari bordered on Mikawa, Mino, and Ise Provinces. Owari and Mino provinces were separated by the Sakai River, which means "border river." The province's abbreviated name was Bishū (尾州).

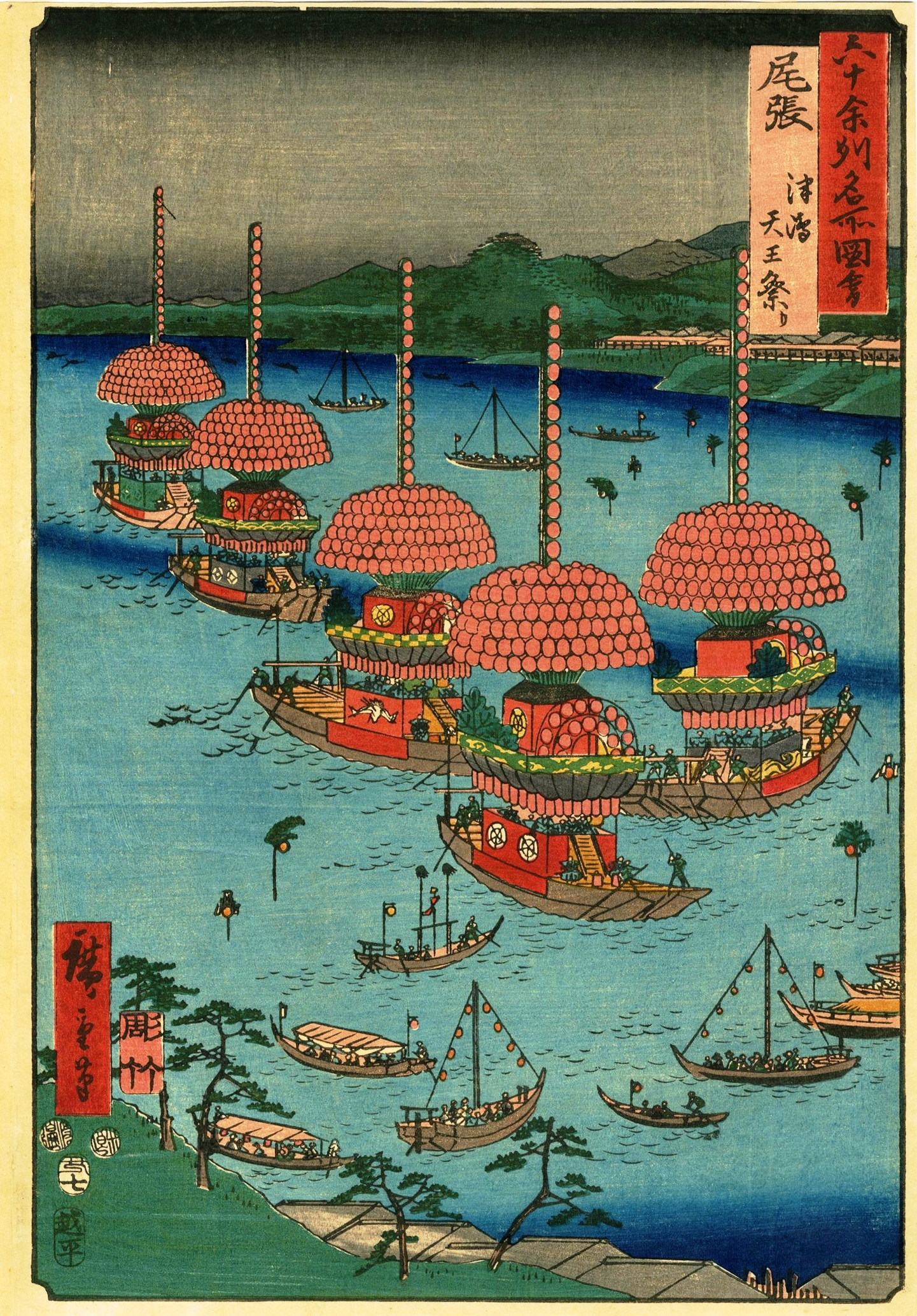
Ukiyo-e print by Hiroshige, Owari, from The Famous Scenes of the Sixty States (六十余州名所図会), depicting a festival at Tsushima Shrine

Owari is classified as one of the provinces of the Tōkaidō. Under the Engishiki classification system, Owari was ranked as a "superior country" (上国) and a "near country" (近国), in relation to its distance from the capital.

== History ==
Owari is mentioned in records of the Nara period, including the Kujiki, although the area has been settled since at least the Japanese Paleolithic period, as evidenced by numerous remains found by archaeologists. Early records mention a powerful “Owari clan”, vaguely related to, or allied with the Yamato clan, who built massive kofun burial mounds in several locations within the province, from which archaeologists have recovered bronze artifacts and mirrors dating from the 4th century. Atsuta Shrine is of very ancient origin, ranking with Ise Shrine in importance, and is the repository of one of the Imperial Regalia of Japan, the Kusanagi-no-Tsurugi.

Under the Engishiki classification system, Owari was divided into eight counties, which persisted as administrative units into the Edo period. The exact location of the provincial capital is not known, but is traditionally considered to have been located in what is now the city of Inazawa, although the Ichinomiya of the province is located in what is now Ichinomiya.

During the Heian period, the province was divided into numerous shōen controlled by local samurai clans. However, by the Sengoku period, the province had fragmented into many small territories largely dominated by the Oda clan. Under Oda Nobunaga, the province was reunified. Nobunaga began his campaign to reunify Japan from his stronghold at Kiyosu Castle. and many of his retainers (who later became daimyōs under the Tokugawa shogunate) were natives of Owari, including Toyotomi Hideyoshi and Katō Kiyomasa.

Under Tokugawa Ieyasu, the province was assigned as a feudal domain to his ninth son, Tokugawa Yoshinao with official revenues of 619,500 koku, the largest domain in the Tokugawa clan holdings outside of the shogunate itself. Yoshinao was founder of the Owari Tokugawa clan, one of the Gosanke, which had the hereditary right of succession to the position of shōgun should the main line fail. The castle town of Nagoya prospered during this period, and Owari Province was especially known for its ceramics industry.

Following the abolition of the han system in 1871 after the Meiji Restoration, former Owari Domain and Inuyama Domain were transformed into short-lived prefectures, which were joined with Nukata Prefecture, which was the former Mikawa Province, to form the new Aichi Prefecture in January 1872. At the same time, the province continued to exist for some purposes. For example, Owari is explicitly recognized in treaties in 1894 (a) between Japan and the United States and (b) between Japan and the United Kingdom.

== Bakumatsu-period domains in Owari Province ==
Domain	Daimyō	Dates	Revenue (koku)	Type
Owari Domain (尾張藩)	Tokugawa	1607–1871	619,500	shimpan
Inuyama Domain (犬山藩)	Naruse	1617–1871	35,000	fudai

== Historical districts ==
Owari Province consisted of eleven districts:

- Aichi Prefecture
  - Aichi District (愛知郡)
  - Chita District (知多郡)
  - Haguri District (葉栗郡) – dissolved
  - Kasugai District (春日井郡)
    - Higashikasugai District (東春日井郡) – dissolved
    - Nishikasugai District (西春日井郡)
  - Kaisei District (海西郡; West Ama) – merged with Kaitō District to Ama District (海部郡) on April 4, 1913
  - Kaitō District (海東郡; East Ama) – merged with Kaisei District to Ama District on April 4, 1913
  - Nakashima District (中島郡) – dissolved
  - Niwa District (丹羽郡)
  - Yana District (八名郡) – dissolved
