= Oda Nobutoki =

Sixth son of Oda Nobuhide

Oda Nobutoki (織田 信時; died July 1556) or Hidetoshi was born the sixth son of Oda Nobuhide, a feudal warlord in Owari Province, Japan, during the Sengoku period.

== Family ==
He was the half-brother of Oda Nobunaga and the full brother of Oda Nobuhiro, with all three having the same father. He later became the adopted son of Oda Nobuyasu, his uncle.

== Life ==
=== Taking control of Moriyama Castle ===
On May 10, 1555, Nobunaga took control of Kiyosu Castle and began using it as his residence. He then gave Nagoya Castle, his former residence, to his uncle Oda Nobumitsu, ruler of Moriyama Castle, who had provided him with support. In turn, Nobumitsu gave control of Moriyama Castle to Oda Nobutsugu.

The following month, on June 26, Nobutsugu killed Nobunaga's sixth younger brother, Oda Hidetaka, who was riding his horse along the Shōnai River near Moriyama Castle. Both Nobunaga and his feuding brother, Oda Nobuyuki, tried to take control of the castle, but Sakuma Nobumori intervened to keep the peace. Nobutoki was allowed to move his forces in and take control of the castle.

During the rebellion of Nobunaga's retainers who intended to replace him with his younger brother Oda Nobuyuki (July-September 1556), which culminated in the battle of Ino, Nobutoki was captured by rebels in Moriyama Castle and forced to commit seppuku in July 1556, or the sixth month of the year Kōji-2.

== Family ==
- Father: Oda Nobuhide (1510–1551)
- Adopted Father: Oda Nobuyasu
- Brothers
  - Oda Nobuhiro (died 1574)
  - Oda Nobunaga (1534–1582)
  - Oda Nobuyuki (1536–1557)
  - Oda Nobukane (1548–1614)
  - Oda Nagamasu (1548–1622)
  - Oda Nobuharu (1549–1570)
  - Oda Nobuoki
  - Oda Hidetaka (died 1555)
  - Oda Hidenari
  - Oda Nobuteru
  - Oda Nagatoshi
- Sisters:
  - Oichi (1547–1583)
  - Oinu
