= Oda Nobukane =

Japanese samurai

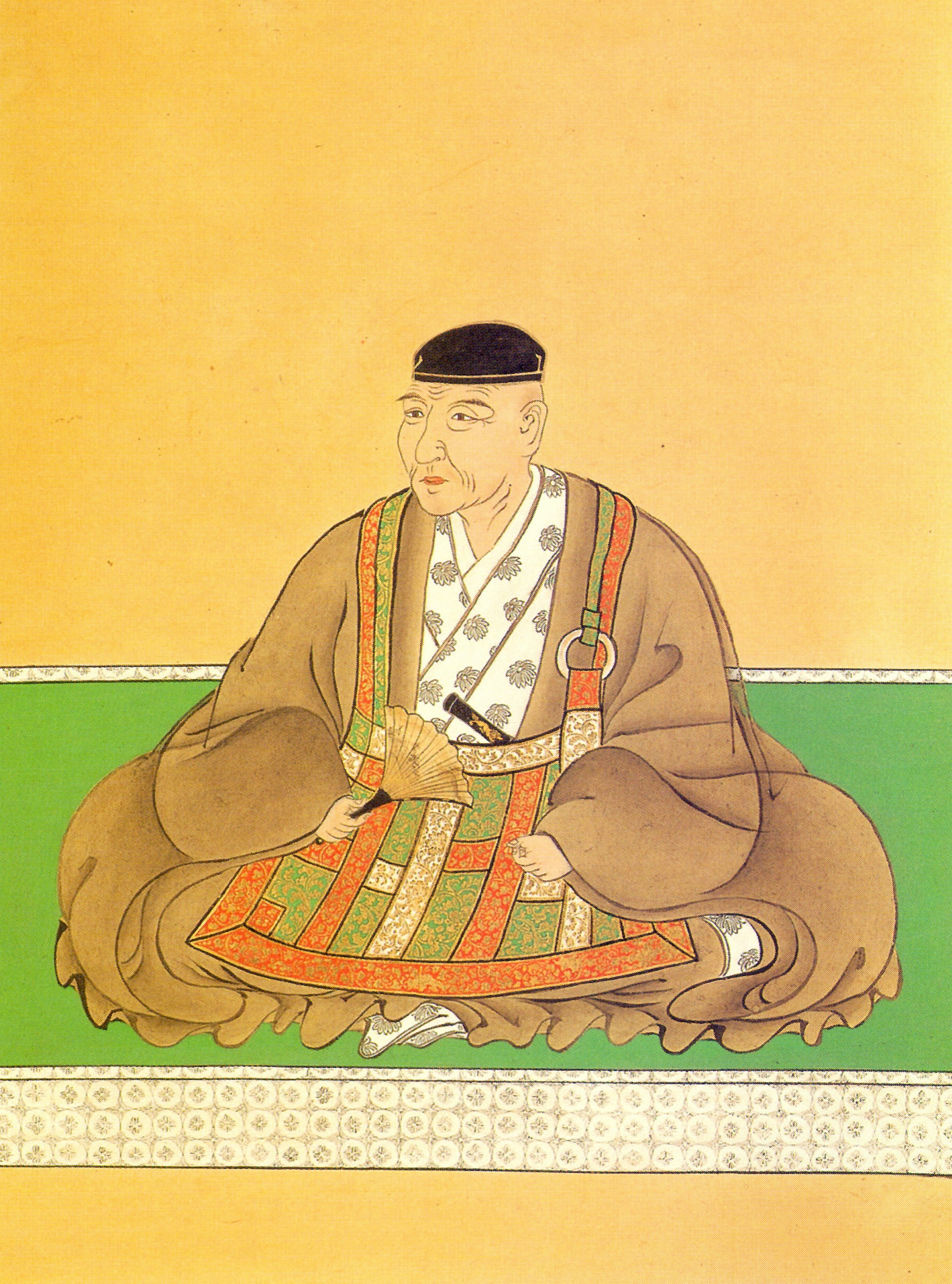
Oda Nobukane

Oda Nobukane (織田 信包; 1548 – August 22, 1614) was a Japanese samurai, the younger brother of the warlord, Oda Nobunaga following the Sengoku period of the 16th century.

Following the year of 1568, Nobukane was destined to be adopted into the Nagano clan. Nobukane afterwards shaved his head and become monk, following the year of 1594.

== Family ==
- Father: Oda Nobuhide (1510–1551)
- Mother: Tsuchida Gozen (died 1594)
- Brothers
  - Oda Nobunaga (1534–1582)
  - Oda Nobuyuki (1536–1557)
  - Oda Nagamasu (1548–1622)
  - Oda Nobuharu (1549–1570)
  - Oda Nobuoki
  - Oda Hidetaka (died 1555)
  - Oda Hidenari
  - Oda Nobuteru
  - Oda Nagatoshi
- Sisters:
  - Oichi (1547–1583)
  - Oinu
- Half Brothers:
  - Oda Nobuhiro (died 1574)
  - Oda Nobutoki (died 1556)
