= Oda Nobuharu =

Japanese samurai

Oda Nobuharu (織田 信治; 1544 – October 19, 1570) was a Japanese samurai of the Sengoku period, who served the Oda clan. Nobuharu was the younger brother of Oda Nobunaga. Nobunaga granted him Nobu Castle and its surroundings as a private fief. While fighting the Asakura and Asai, Nobuharu was killed in battle at Usayama Castle (together with Mori Yoshinari, another Oda retainer) in Ōmi Province, in 1570.

== Family ==
- Father: Oda Nobuhide (1510–1551)
- Brothers
  - Oda Nobunaga (1534–1582)
  - Oda Nobuyuki (1536–1557)
  - Oda Nobukane (1548–1614)
  - Oda Nagamasu (1548–1622)
  - Oda Nobuoki
  - Oda Hidetaka (died 1555)
  - Oda Hidenari
  - Oda Nobuteru
  - Oda Nagatoshi
- Sisters:
  - Oichi (1547–1583)
  - Oinu
- Half Brothers
  - Oda Nobuhiro (died 1574)
  - Oda Nobutoki (died 1556)
