= Oda Nobuhiro =

Japanese daimyo (died 1574)

- 織田 信広

Lord of Anjo Castle
- In office 1540–1574

Personal details
- Died: October 13, 1574
- Parent: Oda Nobuhide (father)

Military service
- Allegiance: Oda clan
- Battles/wars: Siege of Anjo Castle (1551); Battle of Anegawa (1570); Siege of Nagashima (1574)

Oda Nobuhiro (織田 信広; died October 13, 1574) was the eldest son of Oda Nobuhide.

== Bastardry ==
As an illegitimate son of Oda Nobuhide, Nobuhiro's power would slowly fade and he would always be looked down upon by his younger brother Nobunaga, and even by many of his own retainers. Eventually, Nobuhiro was forced to step down as the head of the Oda clan to allow Nobunaga to be the new head.

== Life ==
In 1540, after Nobuhide took Anjo Castle in Mikawa Province, he was given control of the castle.

During 1551, Nobuhiro was trapped by the Imagawa clan, but was saved when Nobunaga handed over one of their hostages—Matsudaira Takechiyo to make up for not lifting the siege of Anjō.

Later on, Nobuhiro plotted against Nobunaga with the assistance of Saitō Yoshitatsu of Mino Province. Their scheme was uncovered before any damage was brought upon anyone, and Nobunaga forgave Nobuhiro.

Nobuhiro was killed later on October 13, 1574, while fighting the Nagashima monto.

== Family ==
- Father: Oda Nobuhide (1510–1551)
- Brothers:
  - Oda Nobunaga (1534–1582)
  - Oda Nobuyuki (1536–1557)
  - Oda Nobukane (1548–1614)
  - Oda Nagamasu (1548–1622)
  - Oda Nobuharu (1549–1570)
  - Oda Nobutoki (died 1556)
  - Oda Nobuoki (died 1569)
  - Oda Hidetaka (died 1555)
  - Oda Hidenari
  - Oda Nobuteru
  - Oda Nagatoshi
- Sisters:
  - Oichi (1547–1583)
  - Oinu
