= Oda Nobunaga =

Japanese samurai and warlord (1534–1582)

Senior First Rank Oda Nobunaga
- 織田 信長
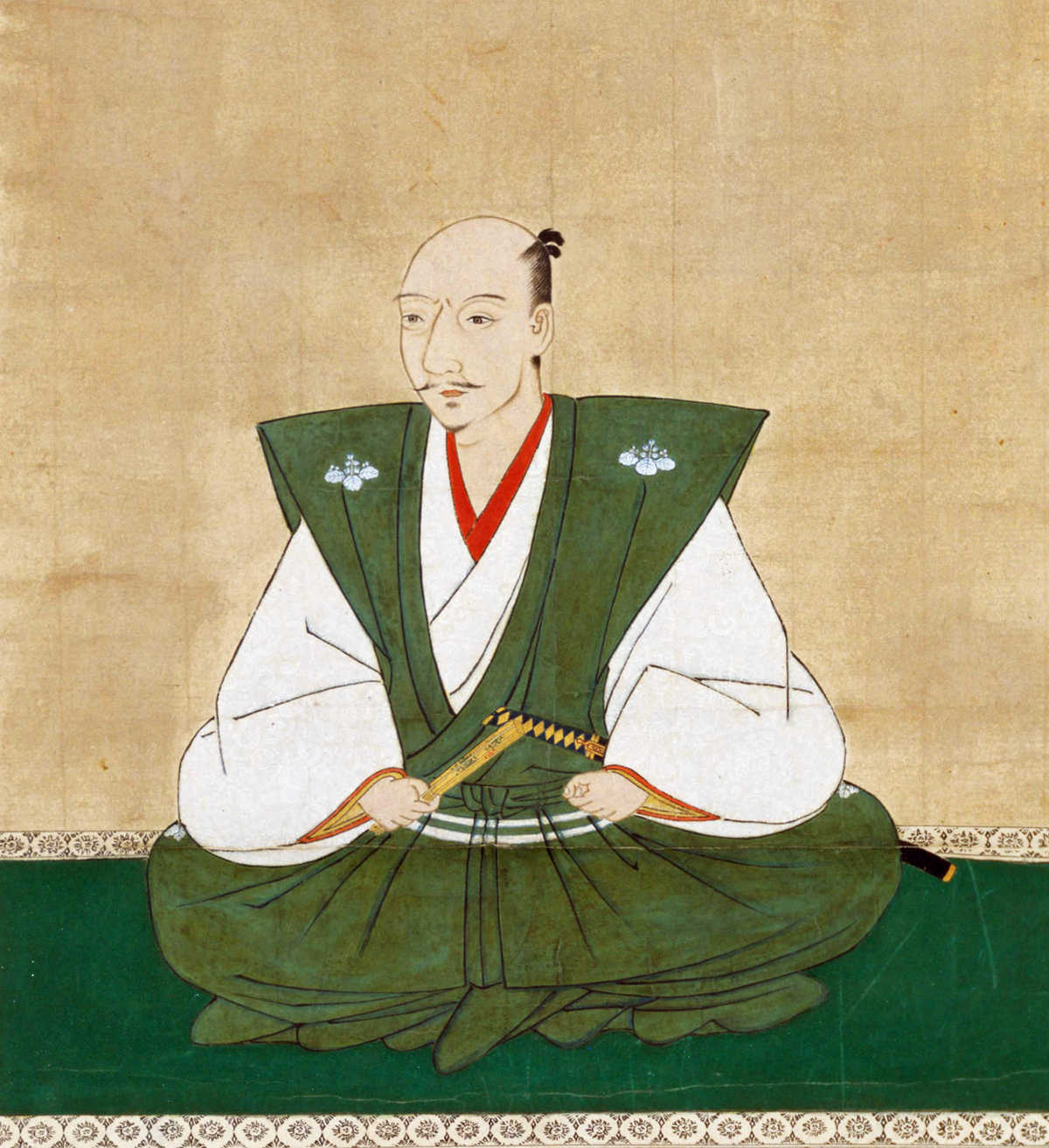
- Portrait of Oda Nobunaga (1583, in Chōkō-ji, Important Cultural Property)

Minister of the Right (Udaijin)
- In office 1577 – 1578; Posthumous promotion to Chancellor of the Realm (Daijō-daijin) in 1582.
- Monarch: Emperor Ōgimachi

Head of Oda clan
- In office 1551–1575
- Preceded by: Oda Nobuhide
- Succeeded by: Oda Nobutada

Personal details
- Born: Kippōshi; 23 June 1534 Nagoya, Owari, Japan
- Died: 21 June 1582 (aged 47) Honnō-ji, Kyoto, Japan
- Spouse: Nōhime
- Domestic partner: Kitsuno (concubine)
- Children: Oda Nobutada; Oda Nobukatsu; Oda Nobutaka; Oda Hidekatsu; Oda Katsunaga; Tokuhime
- Parents: Oda Nobuhide (father); Tsuchida Gozen (mother)
- Relatives: See list: Lady Otsuya (aunt); Saitō Dōsan (father-in-law); Oichi (sister); Azai Nagamasa (brother-in-law); Shibata Katsuie (brother-in-law); Oda Nobuhiro (brother); Oda Nobuyuki (brother); Oda Nobukane (brother); Oda Nagamasu (brother); Oda Nobuharu (brother); Oda Nobutoki (brother); Oda Hidetaka (brother); Chacha (niece); Ohatsu (niece); Oeyo (niece); Ashikaga Yoshiaki (adopted son)
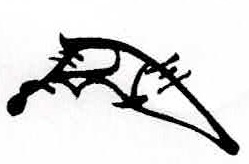
- Signature
- Nickname(s): "Fool of Owari" "Demon "Daimyō" "Dairokuten no Maō Nobunaga"

Military service
- Allegiance: Oda clan Imperial Court
- Rank: Daimyō, Dainagon, Udaijin, Daijō-daijin (posthumous promotion)
- Commands: Azuchi Castle
- Battles/wars: See list: Battle of Akatsuka; Battle of Muraki; Battle of Kiyosu; Battle of Inō; Battle of Ukino; Battle of Okehazama; Mino Campaign; Omi Campaign; Siege of Kanegasaki; Battle of Anegawa; Ishiyama Hongan-ji War; Siege of Nagashima; Siege of Mount Hiei; Siege of Hikida Castle; Siege of Ichijodani; Siege of Odani; Battle of Nagashino; Battle of Tedorigawa; Tenshō Iga War; Honnō-ji Incident see below

Oda clan mon (Japanese emblem)

Oda Nobunaga (織田 信長; 23 June 1534 – 21 June 1582) was a Japanese samurai and daimyō and one of the leading figures of the Sengoku and Azuchi-Momoyama periods. He was the Tenka-bito (天下人; lit. 'person under heaven') (Note: In recent years, Miyoshi Nagayoshi, who conquered the Kinai region before Nobunaga, is often referred to as the first Tenka-bito (ruler).) and regarded as the first "Great Unifier" of Japan. He is sometimes referred as the "Demon Daimyō" and "Demon King of the Sixth Heaven". (Note: 第六天魔王)

Nobunaga was an influential figure in Japanese history and is regarded as one of the three great unifiers of Japan, along with his retainers, Toyotomi Hideyoshi and Tokugawa Ieyasu. Nobunaga paved the way for the successful reigns of Hideyoshi and Ieyasu by consolidating power, as head of the very powerful Oda clan, through a series of wars against other daimyō beginning in the 1560s. The period when Nobunaga and Hideyoshi were in power is called the Azuchi–Momoyama period. The name "Azuchi–Momoyama" comes from the fact that Nobunaga's castle, Azuchi Castle, was located in Azuchi, Shiga; while Fushimi Castle, where Hideyoshi lived after his retirement, was located in Momoyama.

Nobunaga emerged as the most powerful daimyō, overthrowing the nominally ruling shogun Ashikaga Yoshiaki and dissolving the Ashikaga Shogunate in 1573. He conquered most of Honshu by 1580, and defeated the Ikkō-ikki in the 1580s. Nobunaga's rule was noted for innovative military tactics, fostering of free trade, reforms of Japan's civil government, and the start of the Momoyama historical art period, but also for the brutal suppression of those who refused to cooperate or yield to his demands.

Nobunaga committed seppuku during the Honnō-ji Incident in 1582, when his retainer Akechi Mitsuhide ambushed and trapped him in a temple in Kyoto. Nobunaga was succeeded by Toyotomi Hideyoshi, who defeated Akechi Mitsuhide in the Battle of Yamazaki and completed Nobunaga's campaign of national unification along with Tokugawa Ieyasu shortly afterward.

== Early life (1534–1551) ==
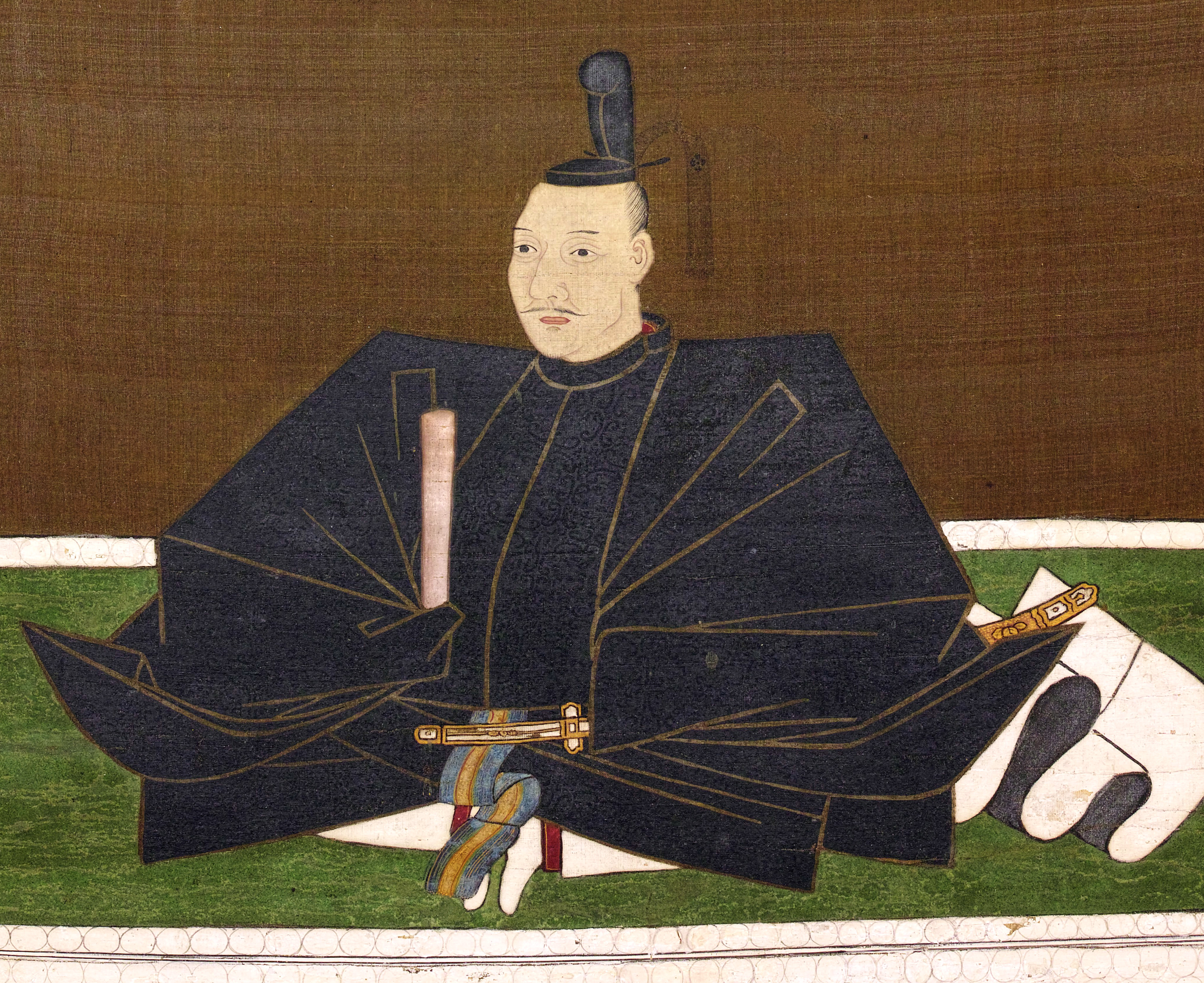
Portrait of Oda Nobunaga in colour on silk (1583, in Kobe City Museum, Important Cultural Property)

Oda Nobunaga was born on 23 June 1534 in Nagoya, Owari Province, and was the heir of Oda Nobuhide, the head of the powerful Oda clan and a deputy shugo (military governor), and his lawful wife Dota Gozen. Nobunaga was previously thought to have been born in Nagoya Castle, but in recent years the theory that he was born in Shobata Castle has become more accepted. Nobunaga was given the childhood name of Kippōshi (吉法師), and through his childhood and early teenage years became well known for his bizarre behavior.

Nobunaga mostly spent his time between the age of 13 (the age of maturity at the time) and 18 in hunting, riding, practicing archery and shooting arquebus (still a novelty in Japan at the time), but also wrestling, swimming, watching sumo and visiting taverns and brothels with his friends. He also showed complete disdain for formal clothing and proper social behavior of a lord, wearing sleeveless bathrobes and short trousers tied with hemp rope in public, eating melons while riding backwards on his horse, and often dancing in female clothing in taverns, gaining the nickname The Fool of Owari.

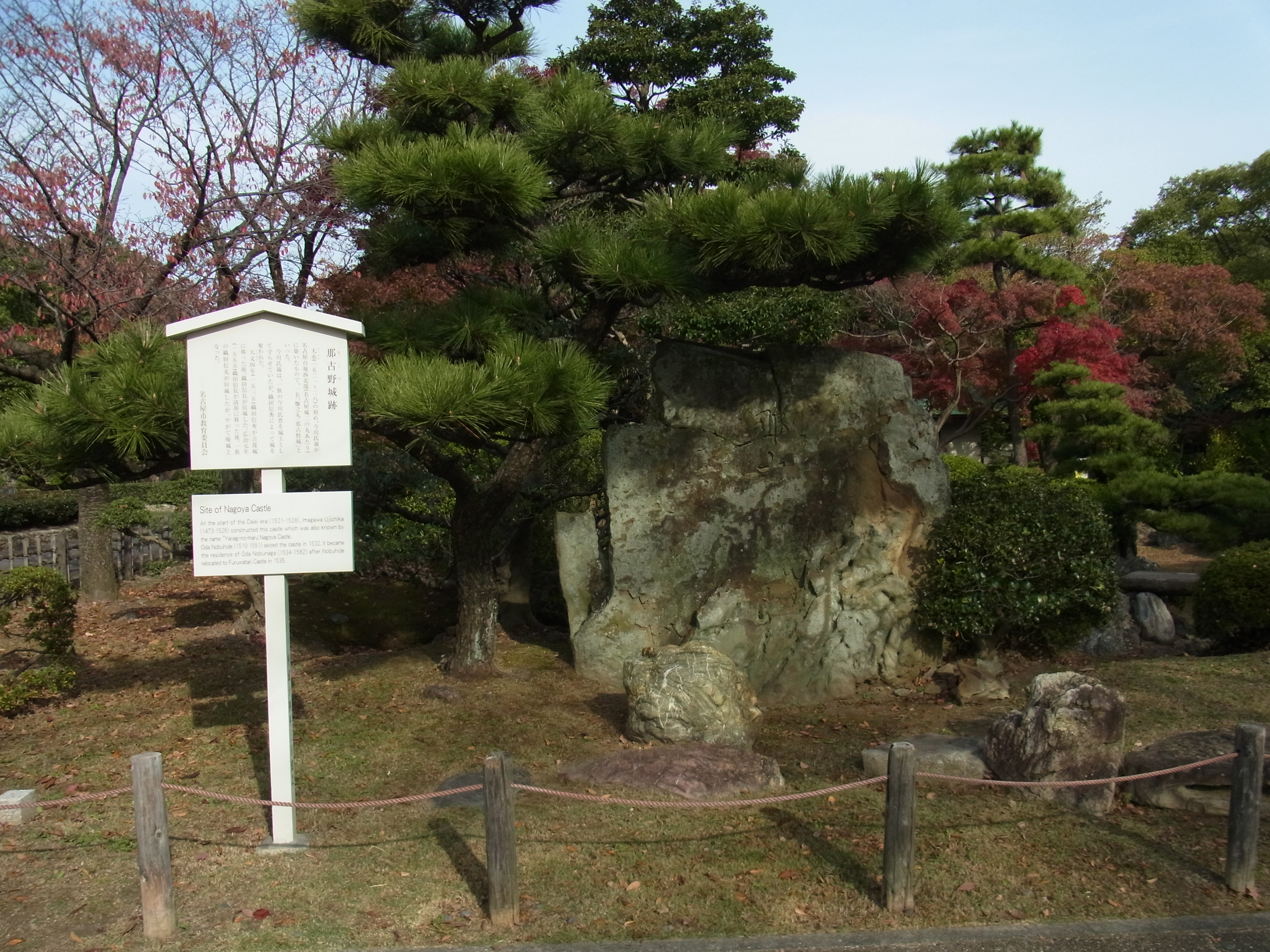
Site of Nagoya Castle (那古野城跡)

Nobunaga was given Nagoya Castle by his father at the age of 8 and lived there for 13 years until he took Kiyosu Castle at the age of 21. He had one or two older brothers, but they were illegitimate sons. As the first legitimate son, Nobunaga was intended to succeed Nobuhide as leader of the Oda clan, and so he was separated from his mother and given special education. Four karō (chief retainers), Hayashi Hidesada, Hirate Masahide, Aoyama Nobumasa, and Naitō Shōsuke (or Katsusuke), were assigned to train and educate him for his future role.

Nobunaga came to manhood and took the name Oda Saburō Nobunaga in 1546. He then led the forces of the Oda clan against rival Kira and Ohama in Mikawa for his first campaign in 1547.

In 1548 or 1549, Nobuhide made peace with Saitō Dōsan, lord of Mino Province (which had previously been hostile to Owari) through a political marriage between his son Nobunaga and Dōsan's daughter, Nōhime. Nobunaga took Nōhime as his lawful wife, and Dōsan became Nobunaga's father-in-law. Nobunaga also became involved in government affairs at this time, gaining valuable political experience and insight.

== Unification of Owari (1551–1560) ==
=== Succession crisis ===
In 1551, Oda Nobuhide died unexpectedly. It has been said that Nobunaga acted outrageously during his funeral, throwing ceremonial incense at the altar. Although Nobunaga was Nobuhide's legitimate heir, a succession crisis occurred when some of the Oda clan opposed him. Nobunaga assembled a force of 1,000 men and used them to intimidate and dissuade his enemies, thus preventing a serious disruption in the transfer of power.

Sensing weakness, the daimyō Imagawa Yoshimoto sent an army under the command of Imagawa Sessai to lay siege to the castle at Anjō, where Oda Nobuhiro, Nobunaga's older brother, was living. To save his life, Nobunaga was compelled to turn over a hostage held by his clan at Honshōji temple, nine-year-old Matsudaira Takechiyo – later known as Tokugawa Ieyasu – an exchange that helped solidify an alliance between other rival clans. Nobuhiro, frustrated by his low standing in the Oda clan, later plotted against Nobunaga with the assistance of another rival, Saitō Yoshitatsu; Nobunaga learned of the plot but chose to forgive his brother's conduct.

In early 1552, barely several months after his father's death, one of Oda's senior retainers, Yamaguchi Noritsugu and his son Yamaguchi Noriyoshi defected to the Imagawa clan. In response, Nobunaga attacked Noritsugu, but was defeated by Noriyoshi's forces at the Battle of Akatsuka. Nobunaga retreated and left contested lands in eastern Owari under Imagawa control.

=== Consolidation of clan leadership ===
In spring 1552, Nobunaga faced a new challenge when his uncle, Oda Nobutomo, attacked Nobunaga's domain with the support of Shiba Yoshimune, governor of Owari province. Nobunaga repelled the attack and burned the outskirts of his uncle's castle at Kiyosu to discourage further attempts. However, Nobutomo was spared any serious punishment.

In 1553, Hirate Masahide, who had been one of Nobunaga's closest advisors and mentors, committed seppuku. It is generally believed that he did so to admonish Nobunaga, but the actual motive is unclear. (Note: There is no doubt that Nobunaga was saddened by his death. He later built Seishū-ji (Masahide Temple) in Ogi Village, which was Masahide's territory, to mourn him.) Yoshimune tipped off Nobunaga that Nobutomo planned to assassinate him; Yoshimune was subsequently captured and put to death on Nobutomo's orders. Nobunaga mobilized his forces to blockade Kiyosu castle and set up a lengthy siege.

In 1554, Nobunaga finally achieved victory over the Imagawa clan at the Battle of Muraki Castle, reclaiming the lands he had lost to them. After securing eastern Owari, Nobunaga then turned his attention back to the siege at Kiyosu, where he eventually defeated Nobutomo and forced him to commit seppuku.

In 1556, Saitō Yoshitatsu raised an army against his father, Saitō Dōsan, who was slain in combat at the Battle of Nagara-gawa. Nobunaga set out for Oura in Mino with troops to rescue his father-in-law, but immediately withdrew upon hearing of Dōsan's death. Thereafter, Yoshitatsu usurped his father's title and became lord of Mino.

The loss of the Saitō clan's support further undermined faith in Nobunaga's leadership; key retainers such as Hayashi Hidesada, Hayashi Michitomo, and Shibata Katsuie soon turned on him. They raised an army to support his brother Nobuyuki (Nobukatsu), who was highly regarded within the Oda clan. Nobunaga defeated the rebels at the Battle of Ino, but at the plea of his birth mother, Dota Gozen, pardoned them. Despite his brother Michitomo's death in battle, Hidesada pledged his loyalty to Nobunaga and resumed serving him, while Katsuie chose to remain in Nobuyuki's service.

In 1557, however, Nobuyuki conspired with Oda Nobuyasu, lord of Iwakura Castle, to plot another rebellion. Shibata, disgusted by Nobuyuki's treachery and disloyalty, secretly warned Nobunaga. Nobunaga falsely claimed to have fallen ill and had Nobuyuki and his entourage assassinated when they came to visit him. It is said that either Kawajiri Hidetaka or Ikeda Tsuneoki carried out Nobuyuki's murder.

In 1558, Nobunaga sent an army to successfully protect Suzuki Shigeteru, lord of Terabe Castle, during the Siege of Terabe. Shigeteru had defected to Nobunaga's side from Imagawa Yoshimoto, a daimyō from Suruga Province and one of the most powerful men in the Tōkaidō region. In July 1558, he defeated his cousin, Oda Nobukata, deputy governor of northern Owari at Battle of Ukino.

By 1559, Nobunaga had captured and destroyed Iwakura Castle, eliminated all opposition within the Oda clan, and established his uncontested rule in Owari Province.

== Rise to power (1560–1568) ==
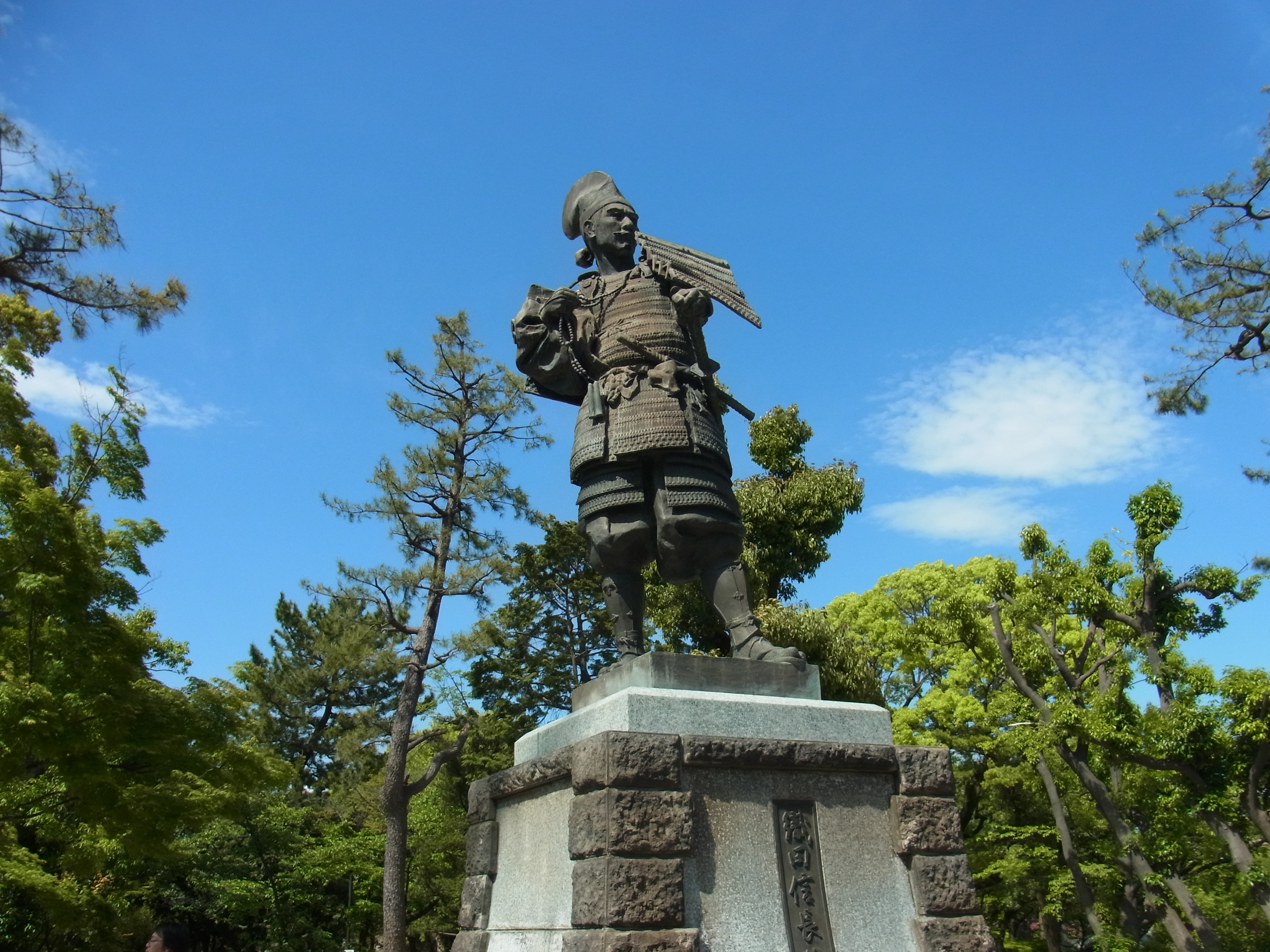
Statue of Oda Nobunaga at Kiyosu Castle

=== Conflict with Imagawa ===
Imagawa Yoshimoto was a long-time opponent of Nobunaga's father, and had sought to expand his domain into Oda territory in Owari. In 1560, Imagawa Yoshimoto gathered an army of 25,000 men, and marched toward the capital city of Kyoto, with the pretext of aiding the frail Ashikaga Shogunate. The Matsudaira clan also joined Yoshimoto's forces.

The Imagawa forces quickly overran the border fortresses of Washizu and Matsudaira forces led by Matsudaira Motoyasu took Marune Fortress from the Oda clan. Against this, the Oda clan could rally an army of only 2,000 to 3,000 men. Some of his advisors suggested that he take refuge at Kiyosu Castle and wait out a siege by the Imagawa, but Nobunaga refused, stating that "only a strong offensive policy could make up for the superior numbers of the enemy", and calmly ordered a counterattack against Yoshimoto.

==== Battle of Okehazama ====
In June 1560, Nobunaga's scouts reported that Yoshimoto was resting at the narrow gorge of Dengaku-Kazama, ideal for a surprise attack, and that the Imagawa army was celebrating their victories over the Washizu and Marune fortresses. While Yoshimoto viewed victory ahead, Nobunaga's forces marched to the Atsuta Shrine, a fortified temple overlooking the Imagawa camp. Later, Nobunaga moved to Zensho-ji fort, set up a decoy army there, marched rapidly behind Yoshimoto's camp, and attacked after a terrific thunderstorm. Yoshimoto was killed by two Oda samurai. With his victory in this battle, Oda Nobunaga gained greatly in prestige, and many samurai and warlords pledged fealty to him.

Kinoshita Tōkichirō, who would eventually become Toyotomi Hideyoshi, probably participated in the battle, but nothing is recorded from that time. His exploits were first recorded in the Mino Campaign.

=== Alliance with Matsudaira (later Tokugawa) and Takeda ===
Rapidly weakening in the wake of this battle, the Imagawa clan no longer exerted control over the Matsudaira clan. In 1561, an alliance was forged between Oda Nobunaga and Matsudaira Motoyasu (who would become Tokugawa Ieyasu), despite the decades-old hostility between the two clans. Nobunaga also formed an alliance with Takeda Shingen through the marriage of his daughter to Shingen's son.

=== Mino campaign ===
Nobunaga's Tenka Fubu seal

In 1561, Saitō Yoshitatsu, Nobunaga's brother-in-law, died suddenly of illness and was succeeded by his son, Nobunaga's nephew, Saitō Tatsuoki. Yoshitatsu murdered his father and brothers to become daimyō, and Nobunaga had attempted to avenge the murder of his father-in-law numerous times. Nobunaga's nephew Tatsuoki was young and much less effective as a ruler and military strategist than his father and grandfather. Taking advantage of this situation, Nobunaga moved his base to Komaki Castle and started his campaign in Mino Province, defeating Tatsuoki in both the Battle of Moribeand the Battle of Jushijo in June that same year.

By convincing Saitō retainers to abandon their incompetent and foolish master, Nobunaga significantly weakened the Saitō clan. In 1564, Oda Nobunaga dispatched his retainer, Kinoshita Tōkichirō, to bribe many of the warlords in the Mino area to support the Oda clan. In 1566, Nobunaga charged Kinoshita with building Sunomata Castle on the bank of the Sai River opposite Saitō territory to serve as a staging point for the Oda forces and to intimidate, surprise, and demoralize the enemy.

In 1567, the Mino Triumvirate (西美濃三人衆, Nishi-Mino Sanninshū)--three samurai generals, Inaba Ittetsu, Andō Michitari, and Ujiie Bokuzen, who served the Saitō clan—agreed to change sides and join the forces of Oda Nobunaga. Their combined forces mounted a victorious final attack at the Siege of Inabayama Castle.

After taking possession of the castle, Nobunaga changed the name of both Inabayama Castle and the surrounding town to Gifu. Nobunaga derived the term Gifu from the legendary Mount Qi (岐山 Qi in Standard Chinese) in China, on which the Zhou dynasty is fabled to have started. Nobunaga revealed his ambition to conquer the whole of Japan and also started using a new personal seal that read Tenka Fubu (天下布武), literally "All under heaven, spreading military force", or more idiomatically, "All the world by force of arms". Remains of Nobunaga's residence in Gifu can be found today in Gifu Park.

=== Ise campaign, Omi campaign, and march to Kyoto ===
Following Nobunaga's conquest of Mino Province in 1567, Nobunaga sent Takigawa Kazumasu on a campaign comprising two invasions of Ise Province in 1567 and 1568 that defeated numerous families of Ise (Ise was ruled nominally by the Kitabatake clan and Kanbe clan). After Nobunaga controlled Ise, his son, Oda Nobutaka was installed as the head of the Kanbe clan. Later in 1569, head of Kitabatake clan, Kitabatake Tomonori, adopted Nobunaga's second son Oda Nobukatsu.

Nobunaga also arranged for Oichi, his sister, to marry rival warlord Azai Nagamasa from Omi Province in an effort to cement an alliance. Nobunaga desired peaceful relations with the Azai clan because of their strategic position between the Oda clan's land and the capital, Kyoto.

In 1568, Ashikaga Yoshiaki and Akechi Mitsuhide, as Yoshiaki's bodyguard, went to Gifu to ask Nobunaga to start a campaign toward Kyoto. Yoshiaki was the brother of the murdered 13th shogun of the Ashikaga Shogunate, Yoshiteru, who had been killed by the Miyoshi tannins (three chiefs of the Miyoshi clan, Miyoshi Nagayuki, Miyoshi Masayasu and Iwanari Tomomichi). Yoshiaki wanted revenge against the killers who had already set up a puppet shogun, Ashikaga Yoshihide.

Nobunaga agreed to install Yoshiaki as the new shogun and, grasping the opportunity to enter Kyoto, started his campaign. An obstacle in southern Ōmi Province was the Rokkaku clan, led by Rokkaku Yoshikata, who refused to recognize Yoshiaki as shogun and was ready to go to war to defend Yoshihide. In response, Nobunaga launched a rapid attack on Chōkō-ji Castle, driving the Rokkaku clan out of their castles. (Later in 1570, the Rokkaku tried to retake the castle, but they were driven back by Oda forces led by Shibata Katsuie.) Other forces led by Niwa Nagahide defeated the Rokkaku on the battlefield and entered Kannonji Castle, before resuming Nobunaga's march to Kyoto.

The approaching Oda army influenced the Matsunaga clan to submit to the future shogun. The daimyō Matsunaga Hisahide kept his title by making this decision to ally his clan with Oda and the new shogun.

On 9 November 1568, Nobunaga entered Kyoto, drove out the Miyoshi clan, who had supported the 14th shogun and who fled to Settsu, and installed Yoshiaki as the 15th shogun of the Ashikaga Shogunate. However, Nobunaga refused the title of shogun's deputy (Kanrei), or any appointment from Yoshiaki, even though Nobunaga had great respect for the Emperor Ōgimachi.

== Unification of Japan (1568–1582) ==
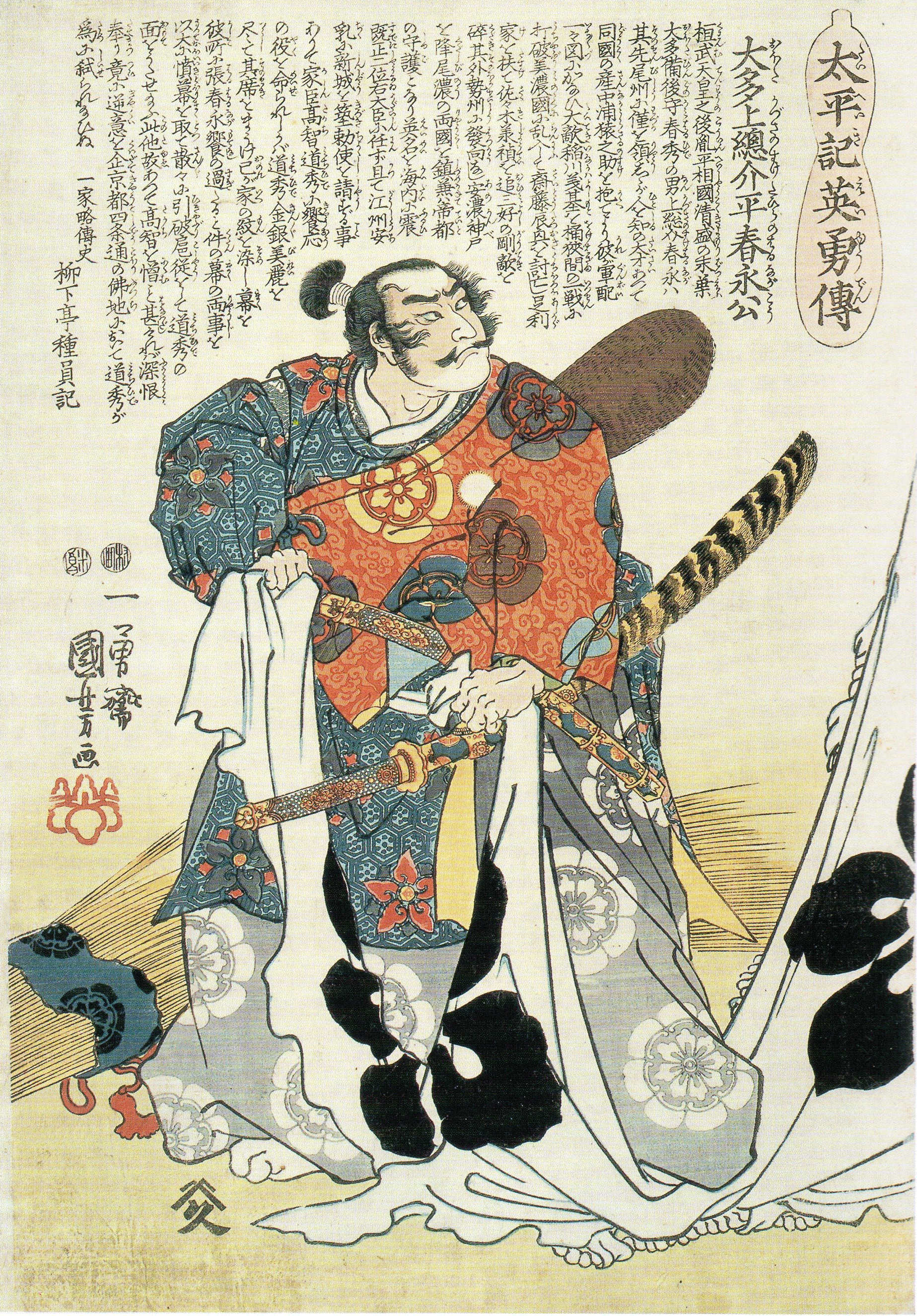
Ukiyo-e of Oda Nobunaga by Kuniyoshi Utagawa

=== Conflict with Asakura, Ashikaga, and Azai ===
After installing Yoshiaki as shogun, Nobunaga forced Yoshiaki to call all daimyō to come to Kyoto and attend the court banquet. Asakura Yoshikage, head of the Asakura clan and regent of Ashikaga Yoshiaki, refused, which prompted Nobunaga to declare Asakura Yoshikage as a rebel.

==== Siege of Kanegasaki ====
In early 1570, Nobunaga then raised an army and marched on the Asakura clan's domain in Echizen. Nobunaga besieged Kanagasaki Castle. This action created a conflict between Nobunaga and shogun Ashikaga Yoshiaki. Yoshiaki secretly started an "anti-Nobunaga alliance", conspiring with other daimyō to get rid of Nobunaga. Azai Nagamasa, to whom Nobunaga's sister Oichi was married, broke the alliance with the Oda clan to honor the Azai-Asakura alliance, which had lasted for three generations.

With the help of the Rokkaku clan, Miyoshi clan, and the Ikkō-ikki, the anti-Nobunaga alliance sprang into full force, taking a heavy toll on the Oda clan. After Nobunaga found himself facing both the Asakura and Azai forces and when defeat looked certain, Nobunaga decided to retreat from Kanagasaki, which he did successfully.

==== Battle of Anegawa ====
On 21 July 1570, Oda Nobunaga was able to cause castellans of castles in Azai territory to defect, causing retreat of Azai forces. On 23 July, he besieged to Odani Castle in Ōmi Province, but withdrew due to the difficulty of the assault on the 24th. Setting up a siege at Yokohama castle, where his forces were approached from the rear by 8000 soldiers under the command of Asakura Kagetake, who was then joined by Azai Nagamasa.

On the morning of 30 July, Nobunaga was joined by Tokugawa Ieyasu a battle occurred on the Anegawa river, near Nomura, in which the Oda were victorious, and the Azai and Asakura clans retreated back to Odani castle. Nobunaga and Ieyasu proceeded to complete the siege of Yokohama castle, then later besieged Sawayama Castle, erecting a long term siege fortifications.

==== End of Asakura and Azai clans ====
1573 represented the end of Azai and Asakura clans, as Nobunaga successfully destroyed the Azai and Asakura clans by driving them both to the point that their clan leaders committed suicide. After destroying Ichijōdani Castle, the castle home of Asakura Yoshikage, then pursuing Yoshikage to the Rokubō-kenshō monastery, where Yoshikage killed himself, Nobunaga then finished off the Azai clan at the Siege of Odani Castle.

=== Ikkō-ikki campaigns ===
Nobunaga faced a significant threat from the Ikkō-ikki, a resistance movement centered around the Jōdo Shinshū sect of Buddhism. The Ikkō-ikki began as a cult association for self-defense, but popular antipathy against the samurai due to the constant violence of the Sengoku period caused their numbers to swell. By the time of Nobunaga's rise to power, the Ikkō-ikki was a major organized armed force opposed to samurai rule in Japan.

In August 1570, Nobunaga launched the Ishiyama Hongan-ji War against the Ikkō-ikki, while simultaneously fighting against his samurai rivals. In May 1571, Nobunaga besieged Nagashima, a series of Ikkō-ikki fortifications in Owari Province, beginning the Sieges of Nagashima. However, Nobunaga's first siege of Nagashima ended in failure, as his trusted general Shibata Katsuie was severely wounded and many of his samurai were lost before retreating. Despite this defeat, Nobunaga was inspired to launch another siege, the Siege of Mount Hiei.

==== Siege of Mount Hiei ====
The Enryaku-ji temple on Mount Hiei was an issue for Nobunaga. The monastery's sōhei (warrior monks) of the Tendai school were aiding his opponents in the Azai-Asakura alliance and the temple was close to his base of power. In September 1571, Nobunaga preemptively attacked the Enryaku-ji temple, then besieged Mount Hiei and razed it.

In the process of making their way to the Enryaku-ji temple, Nobunaga's forces destroyed and burnt all buildings, killing monks, laymen, women, and children and eliminating anyone who had previously escaped their attack. It is said that "The whole mountainside was a great slaughterhouse and the sight was one of unbearable horror."

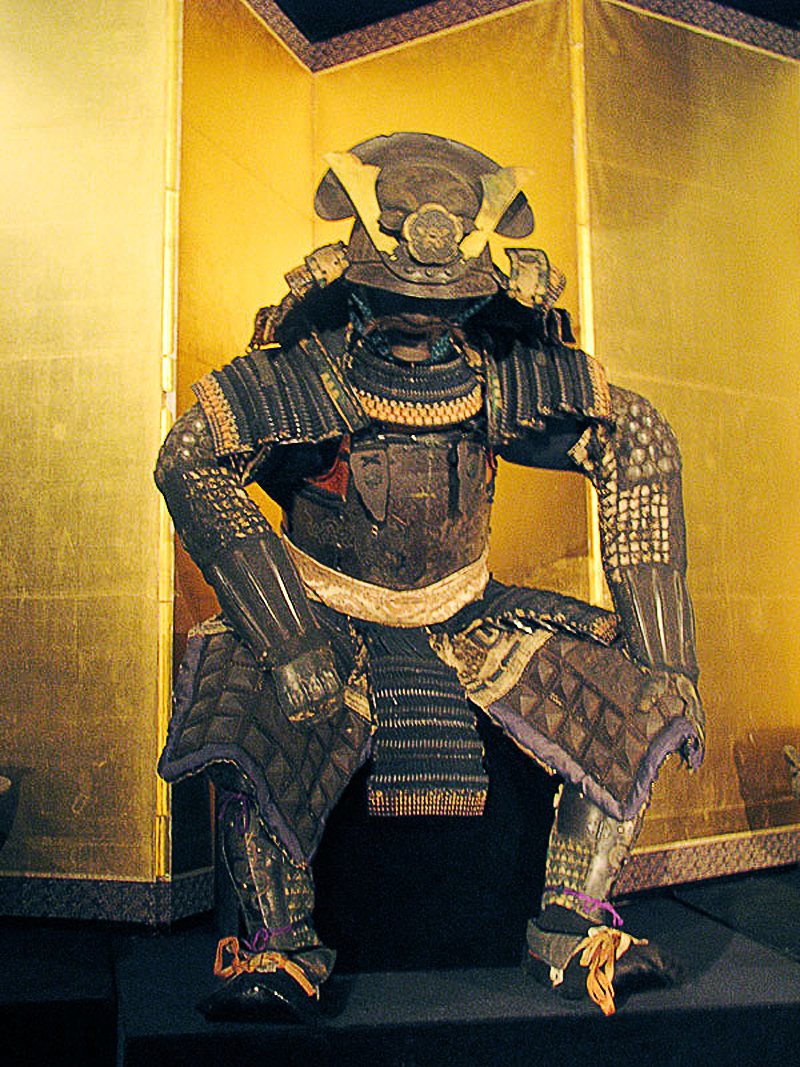
Oda Nobunaga's armour

==== Fall of Nagashima ====
In July 1573, after the successful siege of Mount Hiei, Nobunaga besieged Nagashima a second time, personally leading a sizable force with many arquebusiers. However, a rainstorm rendered his arquebuses inoperable while the Ikkō-ikki's own arquebusiers could fire from covered positions. Nobunaga himself was almost killed and forced to retreat, with the second siege being considered his greatest defeat.

In 1574, Nobunaga launched a third siege of Nagashima as his general Kuki Yoshitaka began a naval blockade and bombardment of Nagashima, allowing him to capture the outer forts of Nakae and Yanagashima as well as part of the Nagashima complex. The sieges of Nagashima finally ended when Nobunaga's men completely surrounded the complex and set fire to it, killing the remaining tens of thousands of defenders and inflicting tremendous losses to the Ikkō-ikki.

==== Fall of Ishiyama Hongan-ji ====
Simultaneously, Nobunaga had been besieging the Ikkō-ikki's main stronghold at Ishiyama Hongan-ji in present-day Osaka. Nobunaga's Siege of Ishiyama Hongan-ji began to slowly make some progress, but the Mōri clan of the Chūgoku region broke his naval blockade and started sending supplies into the strongly fortified complex by sea. As a result, in 1577, Nobunaga ordered Takigawa Kazumasu to suppress Ikko-ikki at Kii Province, Hashiba Hideyoshi to conquer the Chūgoku region from the Mori clan, before advancing upon the Mori clan in Nagato Province, Akechi Mitsuhide to pacify Tanba Province, Kuki Yoshitaka to support attack from the sea, and Nobunaga eventually blocked the Mōri's supply lines.

In 1580, ten years after the siege of Ishiyama Hongan-ji began, the son of Chief Abbot Kōsa surrendered the fortress to Nobunaga after their supplies were exhausted, and they received an official request from the Emperor to do so. Nobunaga spared the lives of Ishiyama Hongan-ji's defenders but expelled them from Osaka and burnt the fortress to the ground. Although the Ikkō-ikki continued to make a last stand in Kaga Province, Nobunaga's capture of Ishiyama Hongan-ji crippled them as a major military force.

=== Conflict with Takeda ===
One of the strongest rulers in the anti-Nobunaga alliance was Takeda Shingen, who had formerly been an ally of the Oda clan. At the apex of the anti-Nobunaga coalition, in 1572, Takeda Shingen ordered Akiyama Nobutomo, one of the "Twenty-Four Generals" of Shingen, to attack Iwamura castle. Nobunaga's aunt, Lady Otsuya, conspiring against the Oda clan, surrendered the castle to the Takeda, and married Nobutomo. Nobunaga was shocked by Shingen's betrayal, and his rage was immense. His letter to Uesugi Kenshin was filled with angry words, stating, "Shingen knows nothing of a samurai's honor," "This grudge will never cease," and "I will never reconcile with Shingen, now or in the future."

In the same year, Shingen decided to march on Kyoto at the urging of the shogun Ashikaga Yoshiaki, starting with invading Tokugawa territory. Nobunaga, tied down on the western front, sent lackluster aid to Tokugawa Ieyasu, who suffered defeat at the Battle of Mikatagahara in early 1573. However, after the battle, Tokugawa's forces launched night raids and convinced Takeda of an imminent counter-attack, thus saving the vulnerable Tokugawa with the bluff. This would play a pivotal role in Tokugawa's philosophy of strategic patience in his campaigns with Nobunaga. Shortly thereafter, the Takeda forces were neutralized after Shingen died in April 1573.

==== Battle of Nagashino ====
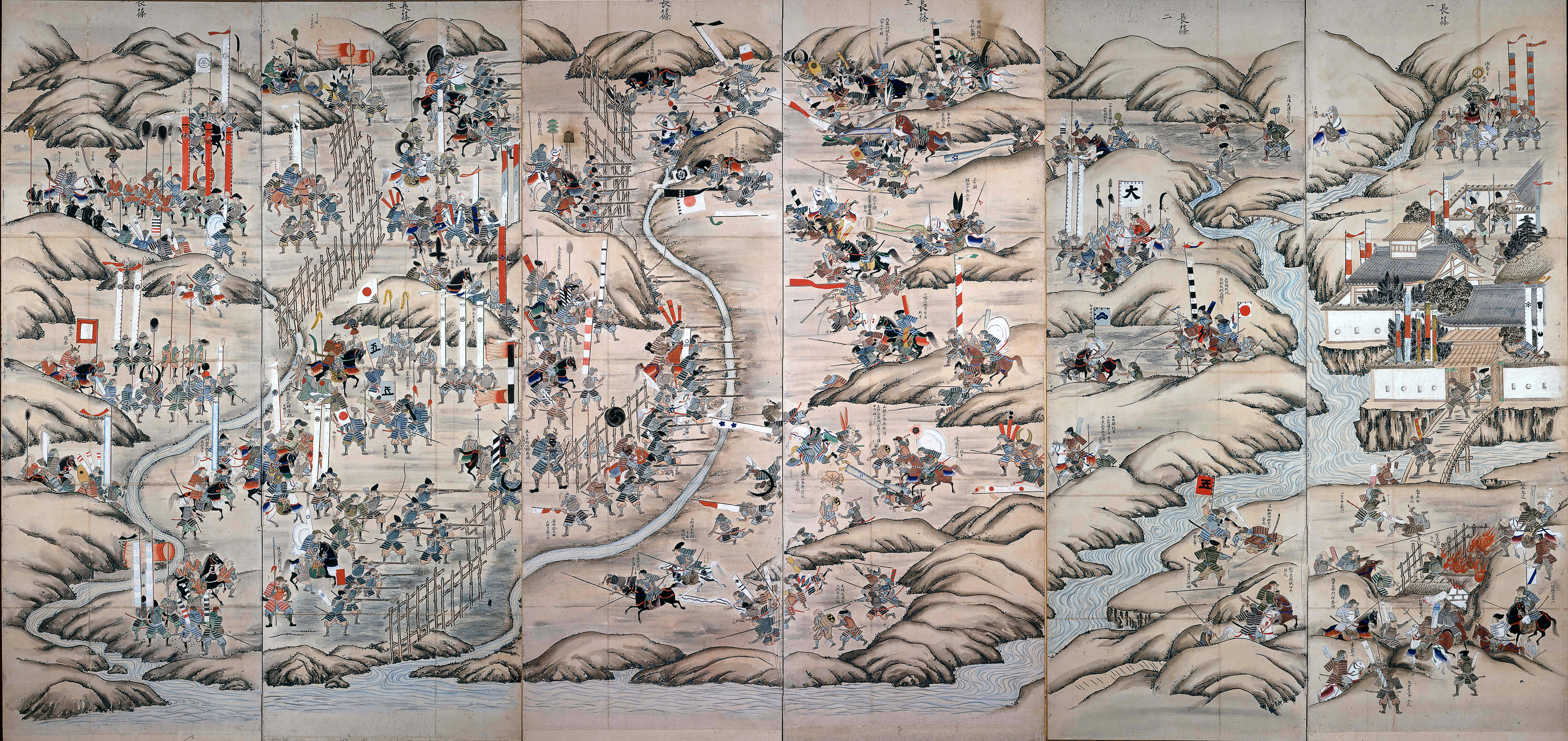
Battle of Nagashino in 1575

In 1575, Takeda Katsuyori, son of Takeda Shingen, moved to Tokugawa territory, attacked Yoshida castle and later besieged Nagashino Castle. Katsuyori, angered when Okudaira Sadamasa rejoined the Tokugawa, had originally conspired with Oga Yashiro to take the Tokugawa-controlled Okazaki Castle, the capital of Mikawa Province. This plot failed. Tokugawa Ieyasu appealed to Nobunaga for help and Nobunaga personally led an army of about 30,000 men to the relief of Nagashino Castle. The combined force of 38,000 men under Oda Nobunaga and Tokugawa Ieyasu devastated the Takeda clan at the Battle of Nagashino, the greatest defeat of the Takeda clan.

Conventionally, the "Battle of Nagashino" was regarded as a historic defeat in which Takeda Katsuyori ordered his cavalry to charge recklessly into a horse guard fence where arquebusiers were waiting for them, losing many Takeda officers and soldiers. Moreover, it has been said that Nobunaga developed a new battle strategy called "three-stage shooting", in which arquebusiers were arranged in several rows with the front row firing a volley, and then making way for the second row to fire. Once the second row had fired and made way for the third row, the first row had reloaded and were ready to fire again. This way the Oda could keep a relatively steady rate of musket fire.

However, this was a theory developed by the Imperial Japanese Army General Staff based on Oze Hoan's Shinchō Ki and Tōyama Nobuharu's Sōken Ki, which are war chronicles. Later, as research based on documents, letters, and Ota Gyūichi's Shinchō Kōki progressed, many errors were pointed out. It is now believed that it was mainly the logistics in Nobunaga's hands that determined the winner. (Note: Nobunaga brought Sakai and other areas under his control and obtained almost exclusive access to lead, the raw material for bullets, and nitre, the raw material for gunpowder, which were rarely produced domestically and could only be imported from overseas through the Nanban trade.)

==== End of Takeda clan ====
The end of the Takeda clan came in 1582 when Oda Nobutada and Tokugawa Ieyasu forces conquered Shinano and Kai Province. Takeda Katsuyori was defeated at the Battle of Tenmokuzan and then committed suicide.

=== End of the Ashikaga shogunate ===
In early 1573, Yoshiaki initiated a siege against Nobunaga under the directive of the monk Kennyo. Takeda Shingen and Asakura Yoshikage tried to subdue Yoshiaki. Azai Nagamasa, Matsunaga Hisahide, Sanninshu Miyoshi, Miyoshi Yoshitsugu, and others also participated in the siege against Nobunaga. Although the siege initially cornered Nobunaga's forces, it failed, as it was interrupted by the death of Takeda Shingen.

In mid 1573, when Yoshiaki began a revolt in Kyoto, he requested the help of the Matsunaga clan and allied with them. Yoshiaki and the Matsunaga clan gathered an army in Makishima castle in April and again in July which is when the revolt started. This angered Nobunaga, who invaded Kyoto. However, when Matsunaga Hisahide saw the hope for success was not achieved he returned to Nobunaga to fight the Miyoshi.

Nobunaga's entry into Kyoto presented him with a situation very different from that from which he had come. Nobunaga reportedly set fire to Kyoto, which forced Yoshiaki to retreat. He focused on Ashikaga Yoshiaki, who had openly declared hostility more than once, despite the Imperial Court's intervention. Nobunaga was able to defeat Yoshiaki's forces, and the power of the Ashikaga was effectively destroyed on 27 August 1573, when Nobunaga drove Yoshiaki out of Kyoto and sent him into exile. Yoshiaki became a Buddhist monk, shaving his head and taking the name Sho-san, which he later changed to Rei-o In, bringing the Ashikaga Shogunate to an end.

=== Imperial Court appointments ===
After the Ashikaga Shogunate came to end, the authority of the Imperial Court of Emperor Ōgimachi also began to weaken. This trend reversed after Oda Nobunaga entered Kyoto in a show of allegiance that indicated that the Emperor had the Oda clan's support.

In 1574, Nobunaga was appointed to a rank of Lower Third Rank (Ju Sanmi) of the Imperial Court and made a Court Advisor (Sangi). Court appointments would continue to be lavished on a nearly annual basis, possibly in hope of placating him. Nobunaga acquired many official titles, including Major Counselor (Gondainagon), General of the Right of the Imperial Army (Ukon'etaishō), and Minister of the Right (Udaijin) in 1576.

=== Construction of Azuchi Castle ===
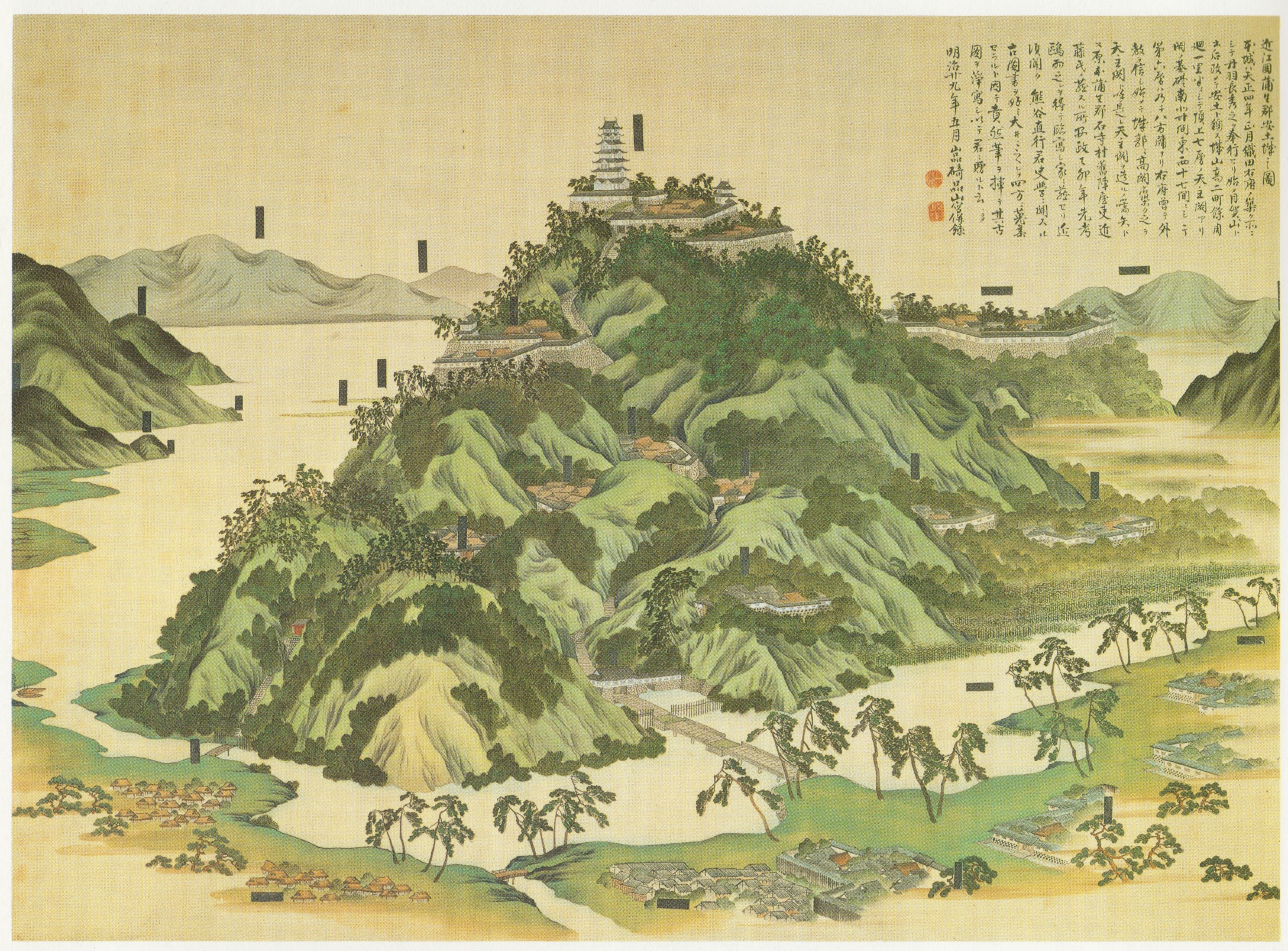
Azuchi-jō-zu, a drawing of the Azuchi castle

Azuchi Castle was built from 1576 to 1579 on Mount Azuchi on the eastern shore of Lake Biwa in Ōmi Province. Nobunaga intentionally built Azuchi Castle close enough to Kyoto that he could watch over and guard the approaches to the capital. Azuchi Castle's location was also strategically advantageous in managing the communications and transportation routes between Nobunaga's greatest foes - Uesugi to the north, the Takeda in the east, and the Mōri to the west. The castle and its nearby town were depicted on the so-called Azuchi Screens, which Oda Nobunaga gave to Pope Gregory XIII, who displayed them in the Vatican collections.

=== Conflict with the Mōri Clan ===
The fundamental policy of the Mōri clan was "to avoid conflict with Nobunaga" and in the early 1570s, even when issues arose, they continued a cautious diplomacy to prevent any decisive confrontations. However, when Terumoto placed Ashikaga Yoshiaki under his protection, war between the two families became inevitable. The Mōri were drawn into the Ishiyama Hongan-ji War, Nobunaga's siege of a religious stronghold in Settsu, which he had begun in 1570. beginning with the Battle of Kizugawaguchi in 1576.

==== Battles of Kizugawaguchi ====
Terumoto turned to the vaunted Mōri navy. In 1576, First Battle of Kizugawaguchi Nobunaga's 'admiral', Kuki Yoshitaka, had cut the Honganji's sea-lanes and sat in blockade off the coast. Terumoto ordered his fleet, commanded by Murakami Takeyoshi, to make for the waters off Settsu and, once there, the navy inflicted an embarrassing defeat on Kuki and opened the Honganji's supply lines.

Later in 1578, at Second Battle of Kizugawaguchi, Kûki Yoshitaka defeated Takeyoshi and drove the Mōri away. Nobunaga also sent Hashiba Hideyoshi to conquer the Chūgoku region from the Mori clan. A further attempt by the Mōri to break the blockade the following year was turned back, and in 1580 the Honganji surrendered.

Following the fall of Itami Castle in 1579, Nobunaga ordered the execution of members of the Araki family and the families of Araki Murashige's retainers. The Shinchō Kōki records a total of 670 victims.

=== Conflict with Uesugi ===
The conflict between Oda and Uesugi was precipitated by Uesugi intervention in the domain of the Hatakeyama clan in Noto Province, an Oda client state. This event provoked the Uesugi incursion, a coup d'état led by the pro-Oda general Chō Tsugutsura, who killed Hatakeyama Yoshinori, the lord of Noto and replaced him with Hatakeyama Yoshitaka as a puppet ruler. In response, Uesugi Kenshin, the head of the Uesugi clan, mobilized an army and led it into Noto against Tsugutsura. Consequently, Nobunaga sent an army led by Shibata Katsuie and some of his most experienced generals to attack Kenshin. They clashed at the Battle of Tedorigawa in Kaga Province in 1577.

==== Battle of Tedorigawa ====
In November 1577, the Battle of Tedorigawa took place near the Tedori River in Kaga Province. Kenshin tricked Nobunaga's forces into launching a frontal attack across the Tedorigawa and defeated him. Having suffered the loss of 1,000 men, the Oda forces withdrew south. The result was a decisive Uesugi victory, and Nobunaga considered ceding the northern provinces to Kenshin, but Kenshin's sudden death in early 1578 caused a succession crisis that ended the Uesugi's movement to the south.

Later in 1578, after the death of Uesugi Kenshin, Nobunaga sent Shibata Katsuie, Maeda Toshiie and Sasa Narimasa to conquer Hokuriku from Uesugi.

=== Tenshō Iga War ===
Map of locations

The Tenshō Iga War (天正伊賀の乱, Tenshō Iga no Ran) was two invasions of Iga province by the Oda clan during the Sengoku period. The province was conquered by Oda Nobunaga in 1581 after an unsuccessful attempt in 1579 by his son Oda Nobukatsu.

The name of the war is derived from the era name Tenshō (1573–92), the era during which it occurred. Other names for the campaign include "The Attack on Iga" (伊賀攻め, Iga-zeme) or "Pacification of Iga" (伊賀平定, Iga Heitei). Oda Nobunaga himself toured the conquered province in early November 1581, and then withdrew his troops, placing control in Nobukatsu's hands.

By the 1580s, Nobunaga was the most powerful lord in Japan, controlling 20 provinces in central Japan: Owari, Mino, Omi, Iga, Ise, Yamato, Yamashiro, Kawachi, Wakasa, Settsu, Echizen, Hida, Kaga, Noto, Tango, Tanba, Harima, Inaba, Tajima, and Hōki.

== Death ==
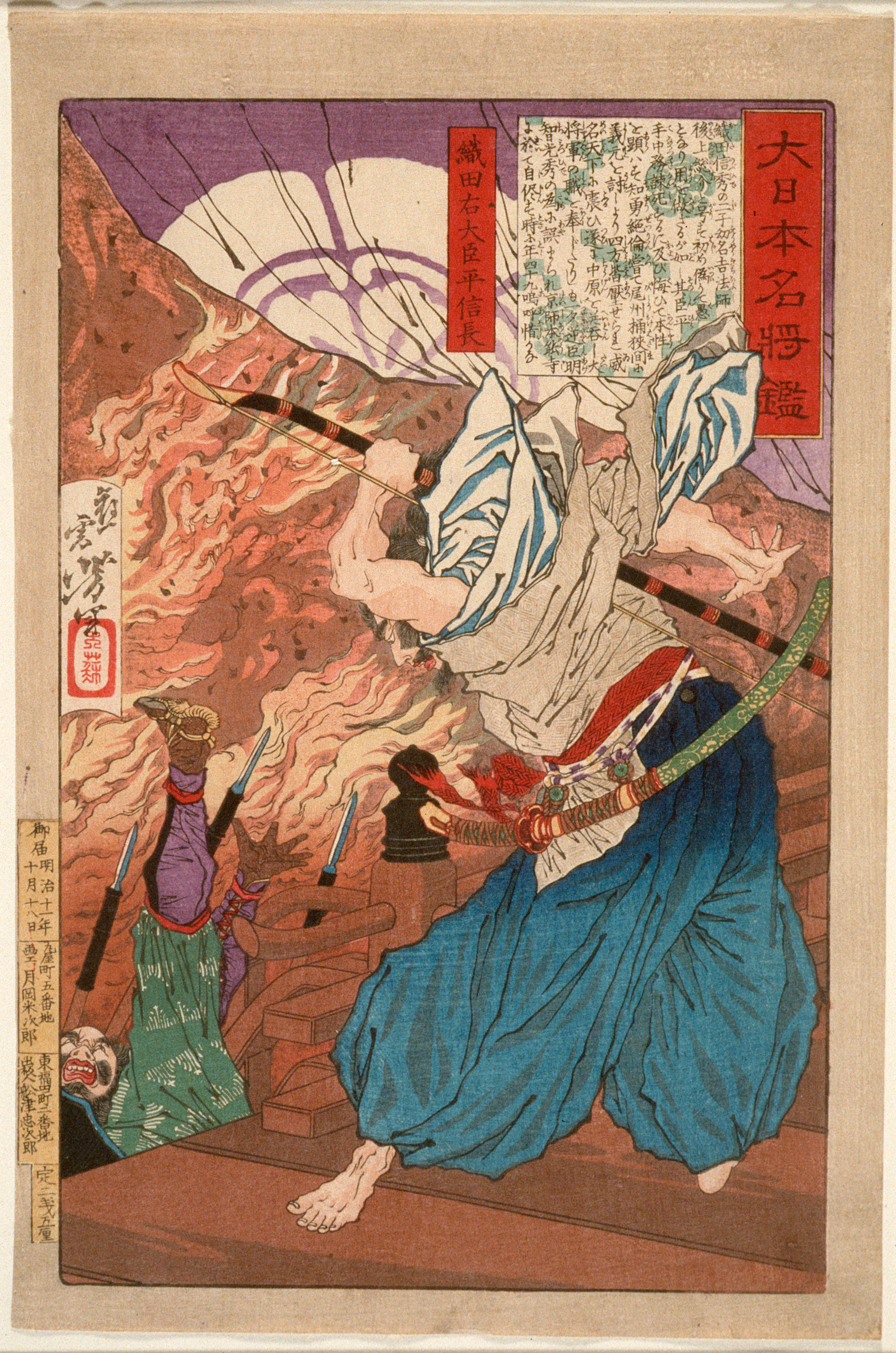
An ukiyo-e by Yoshitoshi depicting Nobunaga fighting in the Honnō-ji Incident

By 1582, Nobunaga was at the height of his power and, as the most powerful warlord, the de facto leader of Japan. Oda Nobunaga and Tokugawa Ieyasu finally occupied Shinano and Kai Provinces, defeated the Takeda at the Battle of Tenmokuzan, destroying the clan and resulting in Takeda Katsuyori fleeing from the battle before committing suicide with his wife while being pursued by Oda forces.

By this point, Nobunaga was preparing to launch invasions into Etchu Province, Shikoku and Mōri clan domain. Nobunaga's former sandal-bearer, Hashiba Hideyoshi, invaded Bitchū Province and laid siege to Takamatsu Castle. The castle was vital to the Mōri clan, and losing it would have left Mōri's home domain vulnerable. More reinforcements led by Mōri Terumoto arrived to relieve the siege, prompting Hideyoshi to ask in turn for reinforcements from Nobunaga.

Nobunaga immediately ordered his leading generals and also Akechi Mitsuhide to prepare their armies, with the overall expedition to be led by Nobunaga. Nobunaga left Azuchi Castle for Honnō-ji, a temple in Kyoto he frequented when visiting the city, where he was to hold a tea ceremony. Hence, Nobunaga only had 30 pages with him, while his son Oda Nobutada had brought 2,000 of his cavalrymen.

=== Honnō-ji incident ===
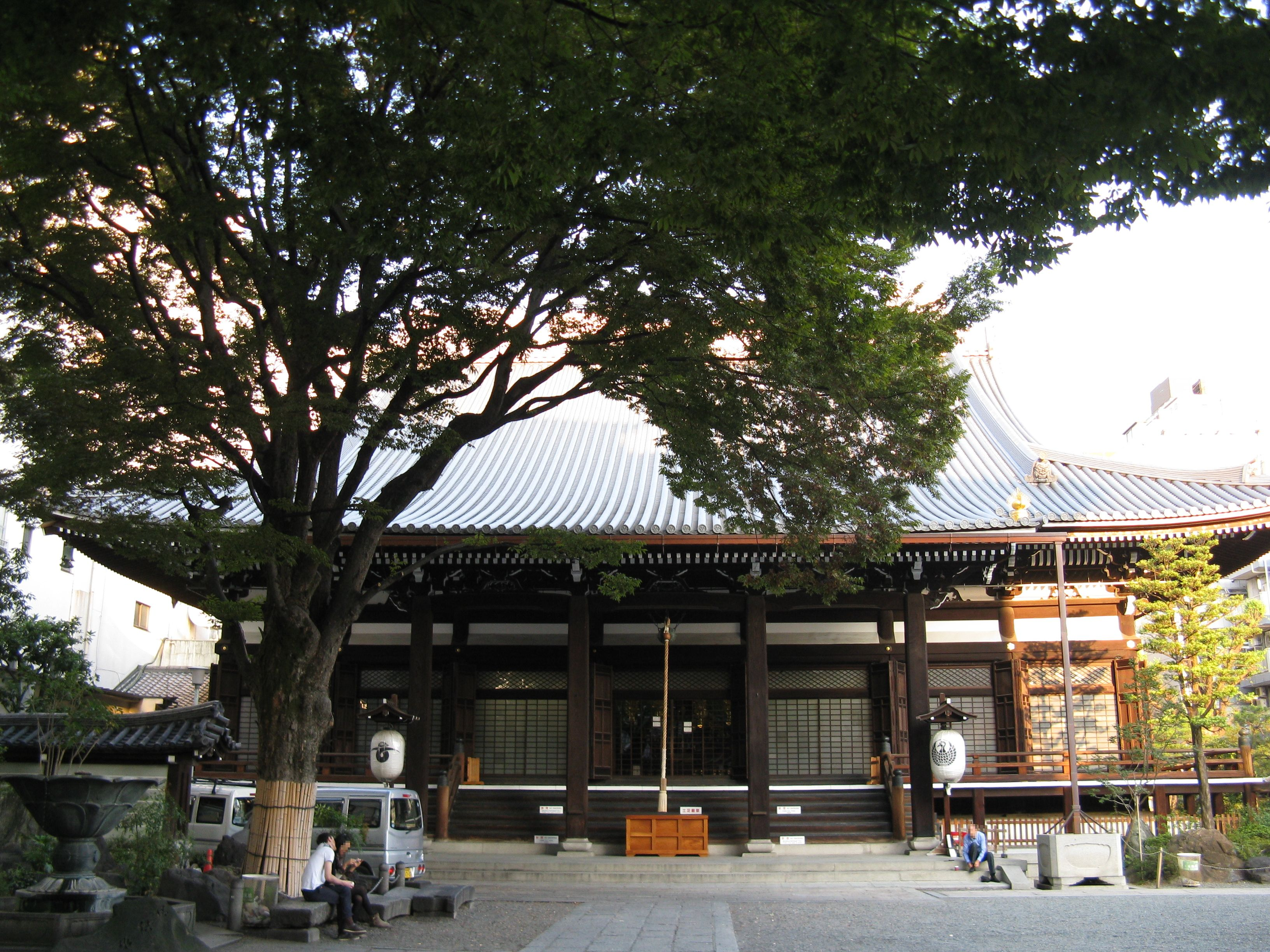
Honnō-ji temple main hall

Mitsuhide, aware that Nobunaga was nearby and unprotected for his tea ceremony, saw an opportunity to act. At that time, Mitsuhide is said to have announced to his troops that "The enemy awaits at Honnō-ji!" (敵は本能寺にあり, Teki wa Honnō-ji ni ari). But this is a later creation. In reality, Mitsuhide kept the target of the attack secret from his troops so that information would not leak out.

On 21 June 1582, before dawn, the Akechi army surrounded the Honnō-ji temple with Nobunaga present, while another unit of Akechi troops was sent to Myōkaku-ji. Although Nobunaga and his servants resisted the unexpected intrusion, they were soon overwhelmed. Nobunaga also fought back for a while before retreating, and after letting the court ladies escape, he committed seppuku in one of the inner rooms.

After capturing Honnō-ji, Mitsuhide attacked Nobutada, the eldest son and heir of Nobunaga, at Nijō. Nobutada also died by suicide.

Mitsuhide searched for Nobunaga's body but could not find it. As a result, he was unable to prove Nobunaga's death, thus neither providing justification for his rebellion nor gaining support from those who doubted Nobunaga's death.

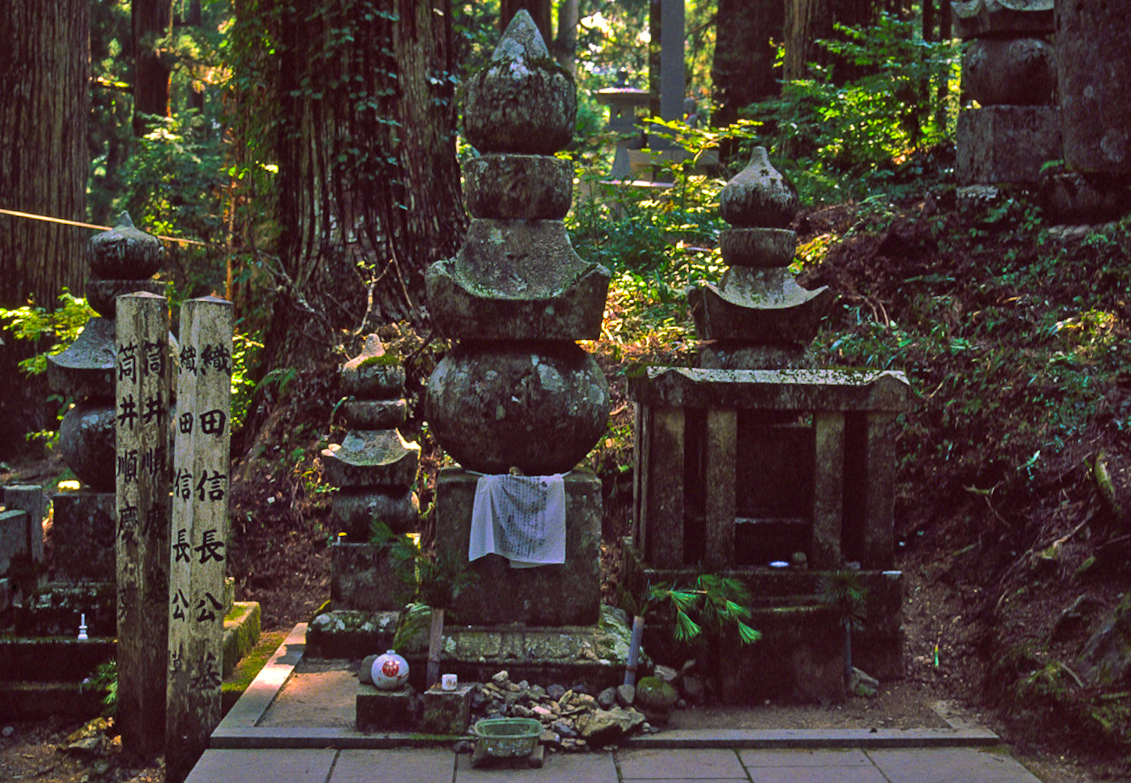
Grave of Oda Nobunaga at Mount Kōya, Wakayama Prefecture

== Post-death events ==
=== Death and succession ===
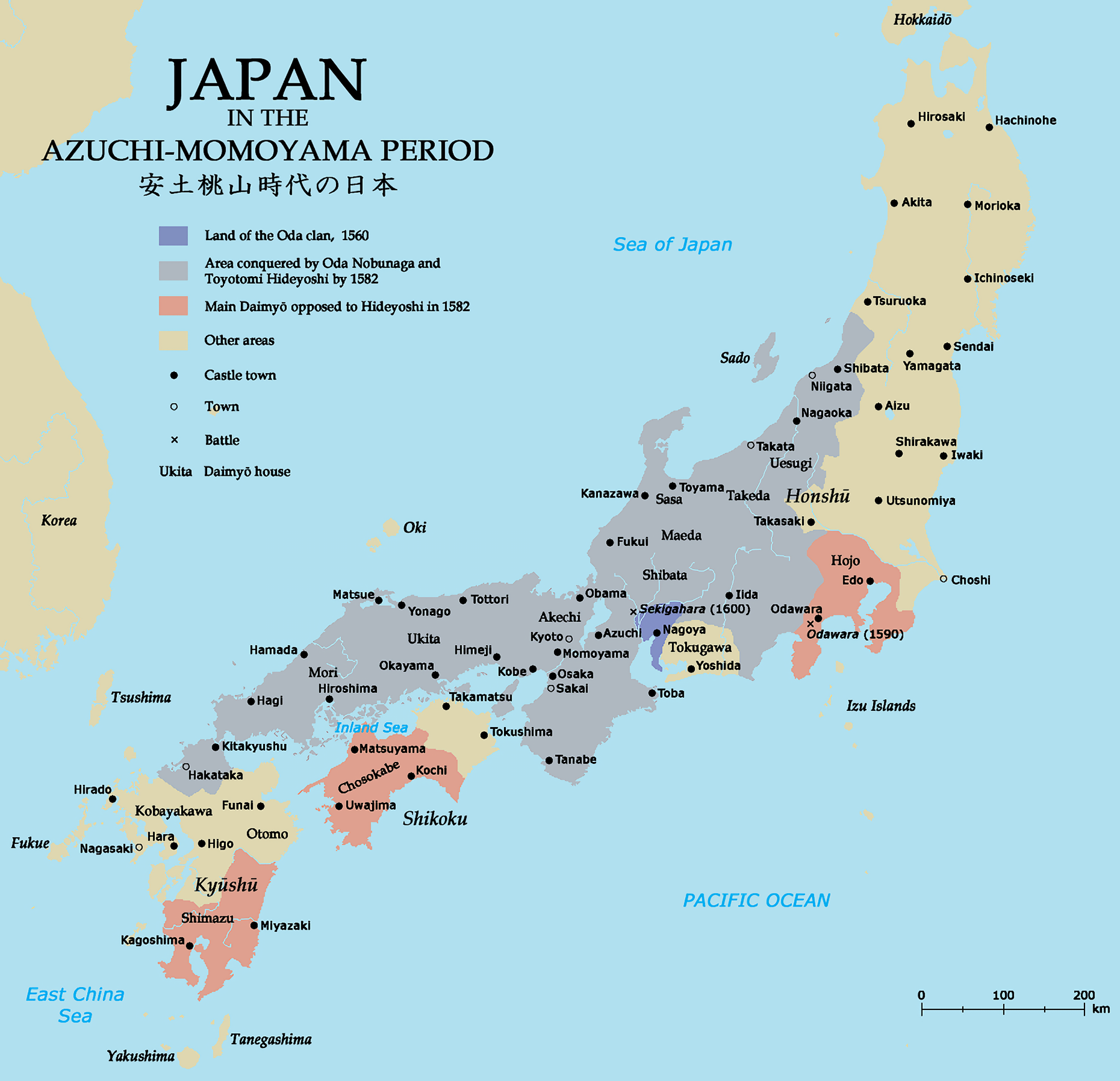
Political situation in Japan circa 1582. The purple area was territory controlled by the Oda in 1560, grey area was the territory Nobunaga controlled at the time of his death in 1582.

The goal of national unification and a return to the comparative political stability of the earlier Muromachi period was widely shared by the multitude of autonomous daimyō during the Sengoku period. Oda Nobunaga was the first for whom this goal seemed attainable. He controlled most of Honshu shortly before his death in the Honnō-ji Incident of 1582.

After the incident, Mitsuhide declared to the world that he would rule over Nobunaga's territory, but was soon defeated by Toyotomi Hideyoshi. The loss of his position and power so quickly gave rise to the idiom Mikka Tenka (三日天下, lit. 'a three-day reign').

Later, Hideyoshi succeeded in regaining Oda's territory and wrested control of it from the Oda clan, further expanding his dominion greatly. And when he was appointed to the highest rank of kuge, Kanpaku, despite being a common-born samurai, and in 1590, eight years after the incident, he achieved the unification of Japan.

The nature of the succession of power through the three daimyō is reflected in a well-known Japanese idiom:

Nobunaga pounds the national rice cake, Hideyoshi kneads it, and in the end, Ieyasu sits down and eats it.

The changing character of power through Nobunaga, Hideyoshi, and Ieyasu is reflected in another well-known idiom: (Note: They do not necessarily reflect their actual personalities.)

Nobunaga said: "Little bird, sing. If you don't sing, I will kill you".
Hideyoshi said: "Little bird, sing. If you don't sing, I will make you sing".
Ieyasu said: "Little bird, sing. If you don't sing, I will wait for you to sing".

All three were born within eight years of each other (1534 to 1542), started their careers as samurai, and finished them as statesmen. Nobunaga inherited his father's domain at the age of 17, and quickly gained control of Owari Province through gekokujo. Hideyoshi started his career in Nobunaga's army as an ashigaru but quickly rose up through the ranks as a samurai. Ieyasu initially fought against Nobunaga as the heir of a rival daimyō, but later expanded his own inheritance through a profitable alliance with Nobunaga.

=== Later plans ===
In 1579, Nobunaga's resignation from his posts as Udaijin (Minister of the Right) and Ukonoe no daisho (Right general of the Imperial Guard) baffled the Imperial Court. This was because Nobunaga, who was on the verge of unifying the country, did not hold an official position that could shake the authority of the Imperial Court.

Therefore, in May 1582, the Imperial Court sent a message to Nobunaga, offering him a government position of his choice among Sei-i Taishōgun, Kanpaku and Dajō-daijin. However, Nobunaga did not give a clear reply and the 'Honnoji Incident' took place, so it remains unclear what kind of government scheme Nobunaga had in mind.

In 1582, Nobunaga was posthumously promoted and given the title of Dajō-daijin and the court rank of Junior First Rank (従一位, ju ichi-i). More than 300 years later, in 1917, he was further promoted and given the rank of Senior First Rank (正一位, shō ichi-i).

In the addendum to Luís Fróis's 1582 Annals of Japan (on Nobunaga's death), it is stated that Nobunaga intended to conquer China. According to Fróis, Nobunaga intended to organise a large fleet after the unification of Japan and to have his sons divide and rule the territory. However, there is no such statement in Japanese sources, and many researchers doubt its authenticity.

According to Luís Fróis's History of Japan, Nobunaga attempted to deify himself in his later years by building Sōken-ji in part of Azuchi Castle and installing a stone called Bonsan as a deity to replace him. Frois, a Christian, attributes this to Nobunaga's arrogance which drove him to the madness of wanting to be worshipped on earth, and the Honnō-ji Incident was his punishment.

Many researchers doubt the authenticity of Frois's description, as there is no mention of this in the Japanese sources. However, the existence of Bonsan itself is mentioned in Shinchō Kōki. As for the reason for his self-deification, it is thought that it was to give legitimacy to those with Oda family blood to rule the country, with a view to establishing a hereditary shogunate after the unification of the country. Later, after their deaths, Hideyoshi and Ieyasu directed themselves to be worshipped as deities, with Hideyoshi being deified as Toyokuni daimyōjin and Ieyasu as Tōshō Daigongen.

In Japan, there have been no small number of persons who have become gods since ancient times. However, they were deified by others after they died as human beings, whereas these three are unique in that they willingly tried to become gods before they died.

== The Imperial Court and the Ashikaga shogunate ==
Nobunaga led a large army to Kyoto in honour of Ashikaga Shogun Yoshiaki and re-established the Muromachi shogunate, under which he extended his power into the Kinai region. The conventional theory is that Nobunaga aimed from the outset to overthrow the Muromachi shogunate and clan system and, with Yoshiaki at the top, to seize real power himself, that is to establish a puppet government. In recent years, however, a theory has emerged that Nobunaga and Yoshiaki were good partners and that the final breakdown was due to Yoshiaki's betrayal of Nobunaga, and that Nobunaga did not originally intend to overthrow the Muromachi shogunate.

As for the Imperial Court, it was conventionally believed that Nobunaga tried to put pressure on the Imperial Court and destroy the existing order. In recent years, however, it has begun to be thought that Nobunaga may have consistently valued the Emperor and the Imperial Court. For the emperors and court nobles, who had lost their territories to the samurais and were forced to live in poverty without access to financial resources, Nobunaga was a reliable daimyō who made huge donations, and for Nobunaga, his links with the imperial court helped to improve the Oda clan's image.

== Policies ==
After conquering Owari and Mino, Nobunaga used the seal of Tenka Fubu (天下布武) to promote his vision with a view to unifying the country. "Tenkafubu" means "spreading military power throughout the world", and it is the idea of ruling the country peacefully, in other words, ending the Warring States period and restoring peace and order.

Starting with the matchlock gun, Nobunaga paved the way for unifying the country through a chain of innovations, from the development of military technology and new weapons, to the international supply chain for importing raw materials for ammunition, to the development of domestic distribution networks, to the way the territory was governed. Those innovations were supported by the financial resources obtained through his economic plans.

Oda Nobunaga is known for his implementation of a series of innovative policies, such as the abolition of the barrier posts within his domain, thus allowing the freer passage of goods, and promotion of Rakuichi Rakuza (楽市楽座), an economic policy that aimed to revitalize commerce by allowing people to do business anywhere in the castle town, whereas previously they could only do business in designated areas. Rakuza attacked the privileges of the guilds and monopoly trade associations called Za, favoring free business.

At that time, samurai families controlled the farmlands and farmers, while temples, shrines, and court nobles controlled the commerce and distribution industry by controlling the Ichi (market) and Za (trade guilds). Nobunaga knew that his grandfather and father had gained wealth from the water transportation of Ise Bay by taking control of Tsushima and Atsuta ports. He himself also promoted the commercialization of his territory by increasing the circulation of goods and money through the above policies. Nobunaga's promotion of raku-ichi raku-za was intended to deprive temples, shrines and court nobles of their privileges and allow the warrior class to dominate the territory in all areas. In addition, the funds required to obtain the soldiers, guns, and other items that supported the unification of the country were obtained through this.

Nobunaga also ordered the construction and improvement of roads and bridges of the Kinai region. He built bridges across inlets and rivers, chiseled out rocks to make steep roads more gradual, widened roads to three and a half meters, and planted pine trees and willows on both sides of them. Nobunaga developed not only land transportation, but also maritime transportation, including the waterways of Lake Biwa and the sea routes of Ise Bay and the Seto Inland Sea. These measures enabled not only the free passage of people but also the free transportation of goods, thus facilitating distribution. The development of logistics brought benefits not only economically but also militarily, allowing soldiers and munitions to be delivered to the battlefield quickly and reliably.

In general, Nobunaga thought in terms of "unifying factors", in the words of George Sansom.

The Sengoku Daimyō of the time did not change their strongholds, and had to return to their home after each battle, making it difficult for the Takeda, Uesugi, and other clans far from Kyoto to go to Kyoto. However, Nobunaga continued to move his stronghold as his territory expanded in order to control Kyoto, which was essential for unifying the country. He moved from one base to another, from Shobata, Kiyosu, Komakiyama, Gifu, and Azuchi, and his castle in Osaka, the diplomatic and economic center of East Asia, was under construction shortly before his death. He always based his seats of power in the nodes of regional distribution and ensured the maintenance of public peace in the area, thereby promoting the development of the local economy and the concentration of capital in the cities.

Backed by his enormous economic power, Nobunaga overwhelmed his opponents by building stone-wall (Note: Until then, stone walls were used almost exclusively for temples.) castles such as Komakiyama Castle and Azuchi Castle, which consumed more labor and financial resources than conventional castles, and by constructing economic cities (castle towns) connected to them. Nobunaga thus politically extended his power throughout the country through civil engineering projects such as the construction of castles. Toyotomi Hideyoshi followed suit and built Ishigakiyama Castle and Osaka Castle.

Nobunaga implemented financial reforms that introduced a new monetary system. In 1569, the "Oda Nobunaga Eiroku 12 Law" was enacted, which is regarded by some as the beginning of early modern monetary policy in Japan. It was an epoch-making attempt to "increase the volume of money in circulation" and "prevent the inflow of bad money" at the same time. A fixed exchange rate system was introduced, and coins, which had been mixed in disorderly fashion, were clearly defined as standard coins and deteriorated coins. The Oda Clan's guarantee gave value to coins that were considered degraded coins in other regions, revived many coins that had been excluded from trade, and stabilised commercial transactions. At the same time, by differentiating the value of coins according to their exchange rate, the government prevented an excessive influx of deteriorated coins.

Nobunaga also used gold and silver as currency to trade in high-value commodities. Nobunaga himself played a role in expanding the circulation of gold and silver by using gold and silver for purchases in Meibutsu-gari (名物狩り, lit. 'specialty hunting').

One of the attainments of Nobunaga's government, which aimed to unify the country, was the Oda Kenchi (織田検地, lit. 'Oda land survey'), which began in earnest in 1580, starting with the Kinai region. It was an administrative measure that required the daimyō under his command to submit their harvest in the form of kokudaka figures. This was succeeded by Toyotomi Hideyoshi's Taikō Kenchi (太閤検地, lit. 'Taikō land survey').

When asked by the Emperor and the Muromachi Shogun to assume the post of Vice Shogun, and offered the post of kanrei, which was effectively the highest rank in samurai society, Nobunaga declined and instead requested permission to rule directly over three of Japan's largest distribution centres, Sakai (Izumi province), Kusatsu and Ōtsu (Ōmi Province).

What Nobunaga sought from the merchants of Sakai was their enormous wealth, as well as their expertise in the Nanban trade and their own trade routes to obtain raw materials for guns and gunpowder. Nobunaga took Imai Sōkyū, an upstart merchant from Sakai, under his control. Imai established Japan's first comprehensive military industry and supported Nobunaga's unification of Japan by mass-producing guns and securing an exclusive trading route for the import of potassium nitrate, a raw material for gunpowder that was not produced in Japan. Tsuda Sōgyū, a key figure in Sakai's self-governing organization, also severed ties with Hongan-ji and submitted to Nobunaga.

Nobunaga demanded a large amount of war funds from Sakai. Sakai merchants initially refused, but were persuaded by Sōkyū and Sōgyū to accept it. Thus, Nobunaga obtained Sakai without fighting. Imai Sōkyū, Tsuda Sōgyū, and Sen Sōeki (later Sen no Rikyu) were appointed as Nobunaga's tea masters and secured their positions as political merchants.

Nobunaga made personnel decisions based on ability and results, not titles. Until then, the family culture of warlords had been one of respecting family lineage and passing down positions from generation to generation, but Nobunaga made a major shift to a personnel system based on merit. It is known that Hashiba Hideyoshi came from a poor peasant background in Owari, while Akechi Mitsuhide came from a samurai background in Mino, but had spent a long time as a poor ronin. These two men caught up with and eventually overtook Nobunaga's old vassals, including Shibata Katsuie, Niwa Nagahide, Sakuma Nobumori, and others. Among the Oda vassals, Mitsuhide was the first to become the lord of one province and one castle, and the second was Hideyoshi. This was unthinkable for other Sengoku Daimyō.

== Military ==
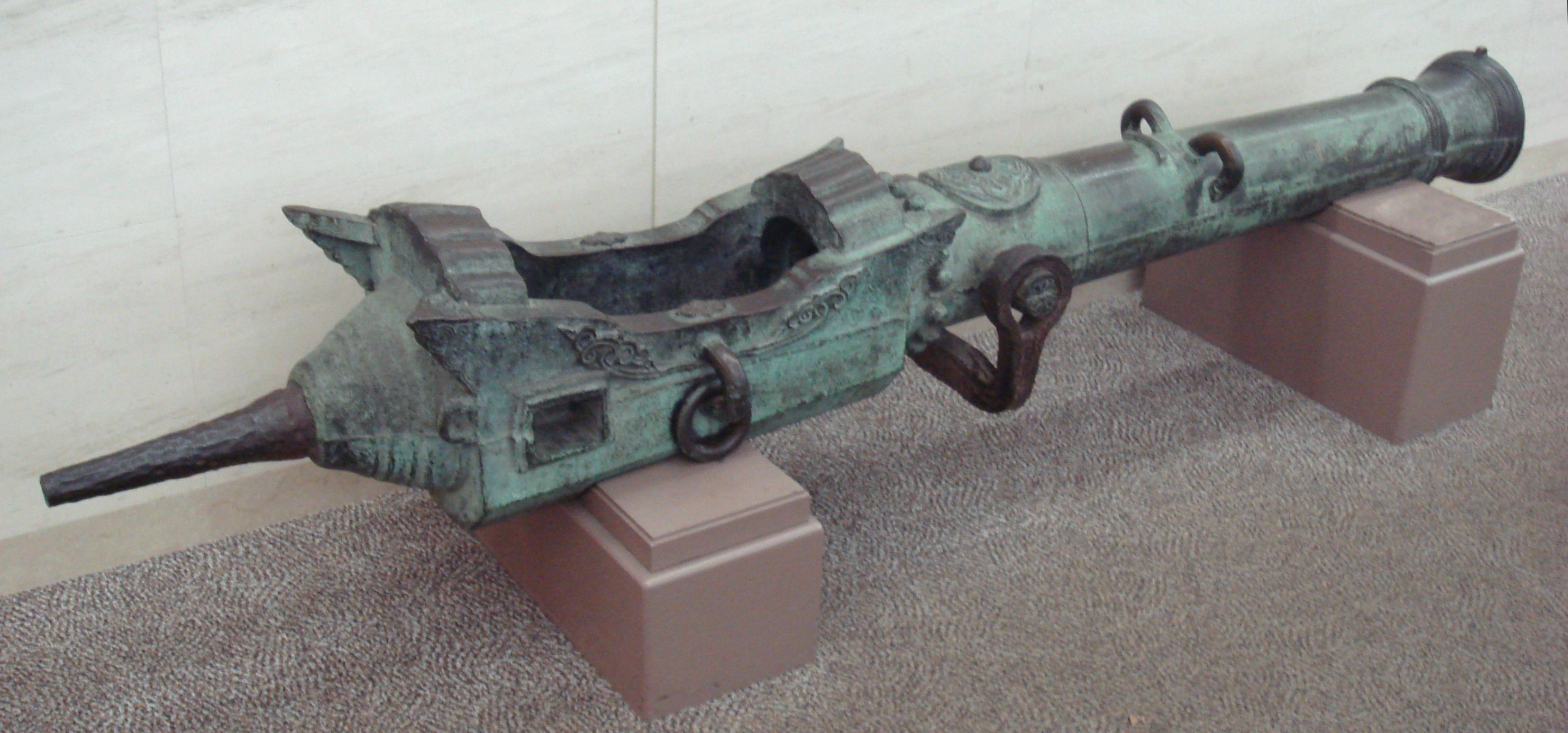
Oda Nobunaga's breech-loading swivel gun, 16th century. This gun is thought to have been cast in Portuguese Goa, India. Caliber: 95 mm, length: 2880 mm.

Militarily, Nobunaga changed the way war was fought in Japan. An unprecedented military revolution was taking place in Japan at the time. Through a military revolution using the new technology of matchlock guns, he ended the Sengoku period of decentralization and moved Japan into the early modern era of centralization. Nobunaga was the first of the other sengoku daimyo to own and use a large number of firearms from an early date.

He changed the perception that matchlock guns, commonly known as tanegashima, were unsuitable for actual combat due to their short range and inability to fire continuously, to the perception that they were invincible weapons by deploying in large numbers firing them all at once. Local historiography Kunitomo Teppoki states that Nobunaga had already recognised the potential of guns in 1549, six years after they were introduced to Japan, and put Hashimoto Ippa in charge of gun production, and that 500 guns were completed in 1550. Shinchō Kōki also mentions that he learnt marksmanship from Hashimoto Ippa around 1550.

Four years later, in 1554, he fielded guns for the first time at the Battle of Muraki Castle, where Nobunaga replaced his guns one after the other and fired them himself, taking the fort in a single day. The Battle of Nagashino in 1575 is famous for the continuous firing of guns, but Nobunaga had already carried it out 21 years earlier.

Documents left behind in Sakai, which was under the direct control of Nobunaga, describing the manufacture of guns reveal that Japan had already become the world's leading gun power, with mass production based on a division of labour for each part. Radiological analysis also revealed that Japanese-made guns using the Japanese sword forging technique were more stable in strength and more powerful because they contained fewer impurities.

Although a mass production system for guns had been established, there was still no daimyō capable of providing a stable supply of ammunition. Nobunaga was the first to make this possible by establishing an international supply chain to import raw materials for ammunition from China and Southeast Asia through Portuguese merchants, which he facilitated by putting international port cities such as Sakai under his direct control and protecting the Jesuits. Later, during the Tokugawa period, Japan exported large quantities of no longer needed firearms to the Netherlands, along with swords and other weapons.

Nobunaga had the previously disparate spear lengths aligned to 3 ken (about 5.5 metres or 18 ft) or 3 and a half ken (about 6.4 metres or 21 ft). The spear lengths used in the Sengoku period were generally 2 ken (3.6 metres or 12 ft). However, when Nobunaga was a teenager, he saw his comrades beating each other with spears in a mock battle and had his army replace their own spears with longer ones, as short spears were useless.

The way spears were used in those days was for miscellaneous soldiers under Ashigaru with long spears to form a line and advance, swinging their spears down from above as if they were striking rather than stabbing. This alone was powerful enough, and if the long spearmen formed a Yaribusuma (槍衾, lit. 'line of spears') with their spearheads facing forward, they could sufficiently counter cavalry units, so the effect was enormous.

Nobunaga introduced civil engineering not only in the political field but also in the military field by turning the battlefield into a large-scale civil engineering project. This was clearly beyond the scope of preparations for a favorable outcome of the war. He invaded enemy territory in force, mobilizing construction workers, carpenters, blacksmiths, founders, miners, and others to construct roads and build tsunagi-jiro (linking castles). (Note: Tsunagi-jiro refers to a branch castle that connects castles.) In attacking castles, he adopted the tsukejiro (attaching castle) strategy of building numerous fortifications around enemy castles and narrowing the siege while moving. Toyotomi Hideyoshi took charge of the works as a field supervisor under Nobunaga and later took over his methods.

Nobunaga is thought to have favored gambling tactics such as surprise attacks because of the Battle of Okehazama, but in reality, he preferred to use overwhelming military power to overpower his opponents.

Nobunaga tried to create a standing army by implementing the separation of soldiers and farmers. Samurais at that time were half-farmers and half-soldiers who spent most of their time as farmers, and only fought at the behest of their lords, who were also the owners of the farmland, in times of war. Therefore, they could not fight much during the busy farming season from summer to autumn.

Nobunaga, on the other hand, attempted to separate soldiers from farmers, although not as thoroughly as Toyotomi Hideyoshi later did. Each time Nobunaga moved his base of operations, he promoted the concentration of his vassals under his castles. As a result, the separation of troops and agriculture was promoted, allowing for planned group training and the formation of army units of different types Sonae (備, lit. 'preparation'), such as firearms units and cavalry units. (Note: In particular, matchlock artillery units by ashigaru, which became the new mainstay of the battle, were stationed in the castle town and military exercises were held regularly. Since guns at that time had no rifling, accuracy was easily affected by the skill of the shooter. Therefore, it was necessary to train the shooters to become proficient.)

Daimyo's bodyguards and messengers were called Umamawari-shū (馬廻衆, lit. 'horse related group'), and Nobunaga divided them into two groups. One group had a red Horo (cloak) on their backs, so they were called Akahoro-shū (赤母衣衆, lit. 'Red Mantle group'), and the other had a black Horo (cloak) on their backs, so they were called Kurohoro-shū (黒母衣衆, lit. 'Black Mantle group'). The leader of Akahoro-shū was Maeda Toshiie and the leader of Kurohoro-shū was Sassa Narimasa.

Nobunaga placed great importance on intelligence warfare. After the Battle of Okehazama, he most highly valued Yanada Masatsuna, who reported every movement of the Imagawa forces that day, rather than the samurais who actually defeated Yoshimoto.

Nobunaga adopted a system of area armies, which enabled him to react in multiple regions simultaneously, and operated it in a large scale.

- Oda Nobunaga's sphere of influence and the departments of each area armies.
  - Chugoku Front: Hashiba Hideyoshi
  - Kinai Front: Akechi Mitsuhide
  - Shikoku Front: Niwa Nagahide
  - Hokuriku Front: Shibata Katsuie
  - Kanto Front: Takigawa Kazumasu

Furthermore, he took a tough attitude towards roadside bandits who stood in the way of trade. As a result, after Nobunaga united Owari, security improved to the extent that merchants could take naps on the roadside. These actions enabled Nobunaga to gain the support of the people and move towards unifying the country. Strict military discipline was inherited by Toyotomi Hideyoshi and Tokugawa Ieyasu, who recognized it as an important factor in gaining public support.

Nobunaga is said to have used six armored ships in the Second Battle of Kizugawaguchi in 1578. Nobunaga, who suffered a heavy blow at the First Battle of the Kizugawaguchi from a hōraku-hiya (Note: hōraku-hiya is a hand grenade-like weapon made of pottery filled with gunpowder. It is thrown after igniting the fuse.) of the Murakami Suigun, the core of the Mori Suigun, ordered Kuki Yoshitaka to build iron-armoured ships to repel the Mori Suigun attempting to bring provisions and other supplies to the Osaka Hongan-ji.

They are thought to have been large wooden ships, Atakebune, covered with iron plates, with cannons on the front and arrows and guns on the sides, with two or three tiers of turrets on the upper deck. However, as no actual ships have survived and historical documents are inadequately described, there are many theories about the appearance and structure of iron-armoured ships. Some believe that they were not actually iron-armoured ships, but simply European-style black ships, or that they may not have been completely covered with iron plates, but only important parts were covered with iron. It is also said that iron-armoured ships were intended to intimidate rather than attack, and could not move much themselves, and were more fortress-like ships floating on the sea.

In Tamon'in Eishun's Tamon'in Diary, there are passages which state that the ship was "a ship of iron" and "prepared to prevent guns (bullets) from going through", and this is the only historical document that provides evidence that the ship was armoured with iron plates. Some argue that since Tamon'in Diary is a primary historical source, its account should be trusted, but it is only hearsay and was not witnessed by Eishun himself. On the other hand, the Jesuit missionary Organtino, who actually observed the ships, wrote in his report that it resembled a Portuguese ship and was surprised that such a ship had been built in Japan. If they were similar to the Portuguese ships of the time (galleons), it is assumed that they would have been very different from Atakebune, a keelless riverboat. The ships were also said to be equipped with three cannons and numerous elaborate and large long guns. Shinchō Kōki (manuscript) mentions that "big guns" were powerful in naval battles, but does not say whether they were actually iron-armoured.

== Culture ==
Nobunaga initiated a period in Japanese art history known as Fushimi, or the Azuchi-Momoyama period, in reference to the area south of Kyoto. He built extensive gardens and castles which were themselves great works of art. Azuchi Castle included a seven-story Tenshukaku, which included a treasury filled with gold and precious objects. Works of art included paintings on movable screens (byōbu), sliding doors (fusuma), and walls by Kanō Eitoku.

Nobunaga promoted the tea ceremony. Not only that, he is said to have built trust with his subordinates by successfully using the system for political use of the tea ceremony, which Toyotomi Hideyoshi later named Onchanoyu Goseido (御茶湯御政道, lit. 'Tea Ceremony Politics'). He actively promoted the value of the tea ceremony in samurai society, giving it a value equal to the fiefdom and rank he received from his lord. He transformed the values of the samurai through the following three actions.

1. Collecting: He collected and monopolised famous tea utensils. In other words, Meibutsu-gari (名物狩り, lit. 'specialty hunting'). (Note: Meibutsu-gari refers to the act by which Nobunaga, in the process of expanding his territory one after another, forced those whom he subjugated to offer tea utensils of high value as arts and crafts, or half-forcibly purchased them from them.)
2. Presentation: He presented his own specialty tea utensils that he had acquired at a tea ceremony.
3. Bestowal: He gave specialty tea utensils to vassals who had made meritorious achievements.

Nobunaga held tea ceremonies with limited participants and showed his authority by displaying his tea utensils, making it known that the tea ceremony was a samurai ritual. He forbade his vassals to hold tea ceremonies, but allowed those who made special achievements to hold tea ceremonies by giving them tea utensils. The vassals then began to take pleasure in Nobunaga's bestowal of specialties and to feel great honor in being allowed to hold tea ceremonies. Thus, among the warriors, the specialty tea utensils and the holding of tea ceremonies became of special value, and they began to covet tea utensils more than the territory given to them by their lord.

Nobunaga was famous for his great love of sumo, and frequently held sumo tournaments at Jōraku-ji in Azuchi between 1570 and 1581, the year before his death. In the beginning, the tournament attracted braggarts from all over Ōmi Province, but gradually it began to draw from Kyoto and other regions. The largest tournament was held in 1578 at Mount Azuchi, with 1,500 participants.

The main reason for organising the tournament was, of course, that Nobunaga was a great lover of sumo. But there was also the practical advantage of selecting young men of good physique and martial prowess, and the aim was to demonstrate Nobunaga's authority by putting on a big show, while at the same time relieving popular discontent by providing entertainment.

Regarding the relationship between Nobunaga and sumo, there is a theory that the Yumitorishiki (bow-twirling ceremony) and the format in which sumo wrestlers are divided into East and West and judged by a gyōji (sumo referee) were born out of the sumo tournament organised by Nobunaga.

Shaving the sakayaki became a fashionable hairstyle that townspeople began to imitate, and became established in the Edo period. It is said that this has made the use of razor blades commonplace for the general public.

== Religion ==
Nobunaga did not actively believe in any particular god or Buddha himself; according to Jesuit scholar Luís Fróis he told people there was no afterlife but he did not deny that he was an adherent of Hokke-shū, and it was common for him to pray for victory and to visit temples and shrines. He never denied or suppressed the beliefs of others for any reason, and was even willing to help and shelter them if they asked for help. Nobunaga rather respected them as long as they did not associate with the various daimyōs or meddle in politics like fixers, but rather devoted themselves to their main task as religious people. In fact, for temples and shrines that did not go beyond their main religious duties, he made donations, paid for repairs to facilities, and relieved them of their territories.

It is sometimes said that Nobunaga hated Buddhism because of his wars with Hongan-ji, his suppression of Ikkō-ikki, his fire attack against Mt. Hiei and his attacks on Mt. Kōya, but this appears to be a misconception. It is true that he showed no mercy, even to monks, but this was not because he hated Buddhism. There is a saying that if you kill a monk, you will be cursed for seven generations, but unlike most daimyōs of the time, Nobunaga simply did not have such a taboo. Nobunaga only fought Buddhist forces as thoroughly as he had fought other Sengoku Daimyōs, and while it is true that he killed thousands of monks and tens of thousands of believers, he never forbade their faith itself. Nobunaga would forgive them if they complied with his advice to surrender, but if they did not, he would send a large army to massacre them and try to suppress them through fear.

Nobunaga attempted to isolate the Osaka Hongan-ji by exterminating the Ikkō-ikki in various parts of the country. Nobunaga's massacre is generally criticized, but there is also the view that Nobunaga had no choice but to massacre them as a result of Hongan-ji Temple's request for thorough resistance from its followers. In the case of Mount Hiei and Mount Koya, they were attacked because they had joined the daimyōs who were hostile to Nobunaga or sheltered defeated soldiers.

Nobunaga gave some liberty to the Jesuits to preach Christianity and sheltered their activities in Japan. One reason for this decision was because the use of matchlocks, which were necessary for warfare, was impossible without the Nanban trade, and because the Nanban trade required Jesuit mediation and diplomacy with Portugal. Although domestic production of guns themselves had already begun, nitre for the gunpowder and lead for the bullets were rarely produced in Japan at the time, so the only way to secure large quantities was to obtain those brought in from overseas by Portuguese merchant ships. The Jesuits also actively backed Nobunaga because of his tolerance to their mission and they considered him to be the closest person to unifying the country, and so they could use his help to curb the Buddhist influence as a common rival.

== Personality and reputation ==
=== Personality ===
Luís Fróis described Nobunaga in his History of Japan as "of medium height and lean build, with a thin moustache and a very clear voice". Regarding his height, in Jesuit Japan Correspondence – Luís Fróis Letter of 1 June 1568, he also describes him as "tall and lean, with a very high voice". His height is estimated to be 5 shaku 5 or 6 sun (166–169 centimetres or 5 ft 5 in – 5 ft 7 in) tall based on a life-size seated wooden statue of him left at Daitoku-ji and the armour he is said to have used.

According to Fróis, he had great understanding and clear judgment, disdained gods, Buddha and other idols, and did not believe in any pagan divination. His sect was the Lotus sect, but he preached in high spirits that there is no creator of the universe, that the spirit is not immortal, and that nothing exists after death, and there are no awards or punishments in the afterlife.

He was extremely fond of warfare, devoted to the practice of martial arts, and was coarse. He was arrogant but honourable, strict in righteousness and enjoyed the deeds of justice and mercy. When others insulted him, he did not hesitate to punish them, but in certain matters he showed amiability and mercy.

He was also temperamental, though not greedy, and could be prone to temper tantrums. He was secretive in his decisions and extremely cunning in his strategies. He was magnanimous and patient, even when the fortunes of war seemed to be against him. He had a somewhat melancholy shadow, but when it came to difficult schemes, he was fearless, and people followed his orders in everything.

He was seldom disciplined, rarely swayed by the advice of his vassals, and was extremely feared and respected by all. He despised all the daimyō of Japan and spoke to them condescendingly, as if they were his subordinate retainers, and the people obeyed him as if he were an absolute monarch. On the other hand, he also spoke cordially with a very lowly and despised servant.

He did not drink, ate sparingly, did not sleep much and was an early riser. He liked his house to be clean and was meticulous in his instructions on various matters. When talking to people, he disliked long conversations and lengthy preliminaries. He particularly liked the famous vessels of the tea ceremony, good horses, swords and falconry. He also loved watching people perform sumo naked in front of him, regardless of status.

Nobunaga's many great achievements were also thanks to the education of his father, Nobuhide. Originally, Nobuhide was only one of the three magistrates of Kiyosu, rather than the whole of Owari, but he gained so much power that he overpowered the Shugodai who ruled Owari. Nobuhide was not only a brilliant military man, but was also a well-known cultural figure in Kyoto. However, he believed that doing the same thing as himself at the turn of the age would no longer work, did not give Nobunaga the same education as himself at all. Nobuhide let Nobunaga do only what he wanted to do and what he was good at. As a result, he had no complexes about anything or anyone.

A letter left by Luis Frois states that in response to a letter from Takeda Shingen signed Tendai no Zasu Shamon Shingen (天台座主沙門信玄, lit. 'The head priest of the Tendai sect Monk Shingen'), Nobunaga signed back Dairokuten no Maō Nobunaga (第六天魔王, lit. 'Nobunaga the Demon King of the 6th Heaven'). Takeda Shingen cited Nobunaga's Fire Attack against Mount Hiei, the head temple of the Tendai sect, as the reason for his hostility to Nobunaga, and to emphasise this and gain support from Buddhist forces, he took the name of Tendai Zasu, indicating that he was the head of Enryaku-ji. In reality, however, Shingen was not a Tendai Zasu or even a believer in the Tendai sect, and it is said that Nobunaga may have referred to himself as the Demon King to mock Shingen's own choice of title.

=== Reputation in youth ===
The young Nobunaga was famous for his bizarre outfit and eccentric behaviour, and people called him Ōutsuke (大うつけ, lit. 'great fool'). At that time, he was dressed in his yukatabira (Note: Prototype of yukata.) sleeves removed, half hakama with a flint pouch and others hanging from it, his hair tied into a chasen-mage (Note: A hairstyle in which the hair is bound into a stick shape and the tip looks like a brush tip.) with crimson or light green threads, a sword in a vermilion sheath, and all his attendants carried vermilion arms. He also devoured fruits and mochi standing up without caring about the public gaze in the streets, or walked in a dishevelled manner, leaning on others or hanging on their shoulders.

Nobunaga had no particular pastimes, but practised horsemanship in the morning and evening, and from spring to summer he would go into the river to practice water drills. He also learnt archery from Ichikawa Daisuke, marksmanship from Hashimoto Ippa and military tactics from Hirata Sanmi. Also at that time, he watched a mock battle using bamboo spears and said that spears could not be used if they were too short, so he had all his spears replaced with longer ones of 3 ken (5.4 metres or 18 ft) or 3 and a half ken (6.3 metres or 21 ft).

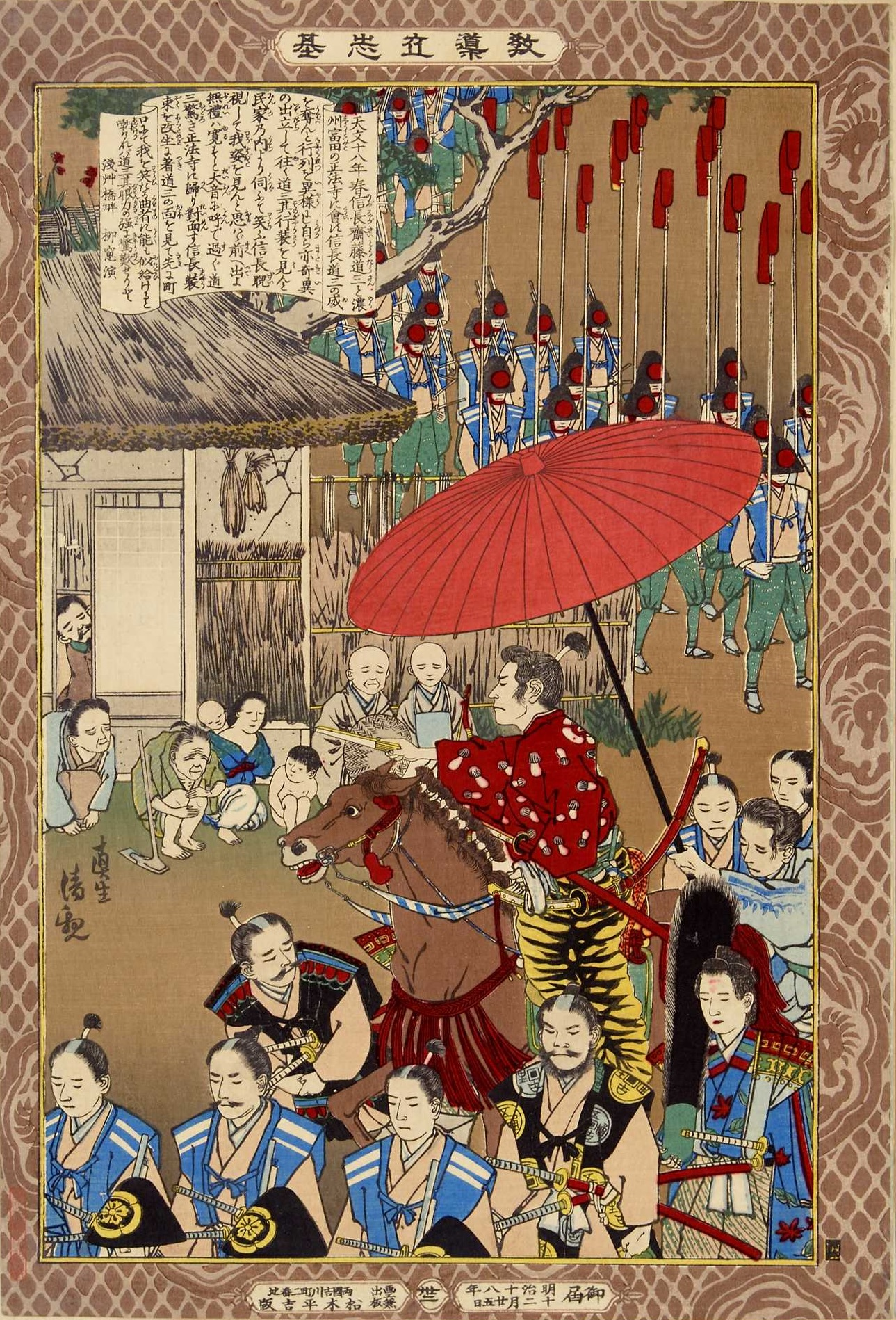
Ukiyo-e Meeting between Oda Nobunaga and Saitō Dōsan (by Kobayashi Kiyochika, 1885, Edo-Tokyo Museum collection)

At the funeral of his father Nobuhide, his younger brother Nobuyuki (Nobukatsu) wore a formal kataginu and long hakama and burnt incense according to etiquette, while Nobunaga came without long hakama, with his hair tied in a chasen-mage, a tachi sword and a wakizashi with a long handle wrapped in straw rope. He then grabbed some powdered incense, threw it at the tablets and walked away.

At a meeting between Nobunaga and his father-in-law, Saito Dōsan, Dōsan sneaked a peek to determine what kind of man his son-in-law was before they actually met. Then Nobunaga appeared with his hair tied up in a chasen-mage with a light green flat cord, wearing a yukatabira with one sleeve off, a tachi sword and wakizashi with gold and silver flakes pasted on the sheath and the long handle wrapped in straw rope, a thick taro stem rope as an arm band, seven or eight flint pouches and gourds hanging around his waist like monkey trainers, and a half hakama made of four pieces of tiger and leopard leather. According to Rojin Zatsuwa, a compilation of stories by local elders, he also had a large picture of a penis dyed on the back of his yukatabira. On the other hand, he was accompanied by a large contingent of a peculiarly organized force of 500 long spearmen and 500 archers and matchlock troops. Dōsan went to the meeting place in his regular clothes, thinking that he would not need formal attire if he were to meet such a fool, but Nobunaga changed back into his haori and long hakama, and for the first time in his life, he appeared in formal attire with his hair neatly folded in futatsu-ori. (Note: A hairstyle in which the hair is bound at the back and folded upwards to form a double-folded mage.) On the way home, Dōsan's retainers laughed at him, saying, "Nobunaga was a fool after all", but Dōsan replied, "That is why I am frustrated. My children will be under the command of that fool in the future", he said with a bitter look on his face.

=== Changes in public opinion ===
Nowadays Oda Nobunaga is one of Japan's most popular historical figures. Despite his brutal image, Nobunaga is widely recognised for his appeal as an innovator who more than compensated for his shortcomings. However, the image of Nobunaga has changed significantly during the Edo period, from the Meiji to the early Shōwa era, and since World War II.

Oda Nobunaga's reputation in the Edo period was rather negative overall. The biggest hero of the time was Tokugawa Ieyasu, the founder of the Edo Shogunate, but he had a surprisingly low public profile, as he was deified and could not be easily treated in popular culture. The most popular figure among the common people was Hideyoshi, who rose from peasant to ruler of the country.

In the late Edo period, he finally received high praise in Rai San'yō's Nihon Gaishi (1827). However, San'yō evaluated Nobunaga from the perspective of imperial ideology more than he evaluated his military strategies. San'yō interpreted Nobunaga's project to unify the whole country as being in the interests of the Emperor.

In the Meiji era, Nobunaga was still not highly regarded. This changed in the Taishō era when the journalist Tokutomi Sohō took up Nobunaga's innovations and gave him high praise for his continuous firing of guns and the abolition of customs checkpoints. However, what Sohō considered most important was still Nobunaga as a kinnoka (imperialist) who ended the shogunate government that lasted from Kamakura to Muromachi and emphasized the imperial court. With militarism on the rise, academism also encouraged the image of Nobunaga as an innovator and loyalist.

On the other hand, the General Staff of the former Imperial Japanese Army studied the battles of Okehazama and Nagashino, and highly evaluated Nobunaga as a tactician. (Note: However, the General Staff did not refer to the highly regarded Shinchō Kōki as a historical document, but to Hoan Shinchō ki, a later war tales based on it, and their theory has been shown to be erroneous by subsequent research findings.)

However, after the Second World War, as a result of the elimination of the imperialist view of history, it came to be thought that Nobunaga should be seen simply as a military commander and a politician. This is because the research style had changed from one based on war tales, such as Hoan Shinchō Ki, to one based on ancient documents. Gradually, Nobunaga's progressive nature began to be discussed and his image as the "favourite of the times" took root. As a result, the pre-war image of Nobunaga as an imperialist disappeared and a new image of Nobunaga as a revolutionary who destroyed the old order and challenged established authority emerged. However, the latest research, perhaps as a reaction to this, has shown a marked tendency to believe that Nobunaga did not uproot the existing system but came to terms with vested interests and promoted gradual reforms, and some assess that he was in fact a conservative daimyō.

=== In popular culture ===
In recent years, Nobunaga appears frequently in fiction and continues to be portrayed in many different anime, manga, video games, and cinematic films, very often wearing a Western-style mustache and a red European cape allegedly gifted to him. However, it was after World War II that Oda Nobunaga became popular.

Nobunaga had previously appeared as Toyotomi Hideyoshi's lord in various Taikōki in which Hideyoshi played a leading role, such as Ehon Taikōki published in the Edo period and Yoshikawa Eiji's historical novel Shinsho Taikōki, written during World War II, but in short he was a supporting character.

Nobunaga was often portrayed as a tyrant in variations of the Taikōki, where his lack of virtue and narrow-mindedness were often emphasised, although his abilities were appreciated.

The post-War image of Nobunaga began with writer Sakaguchi Ango's Oda Nobunaga. He described Nobunaga as a rationalist to the bone.

Nobunaga first gained popularity in Japan with the hit film Fū-unji: Oda Nobunaga (1959), an adaptation of the novel Oda Nobunaga (1955–60) by historical novelist Yamaoka Sōhachi.

The popularity of Nobunaga was determined by the success of Shiba Ryōtarō's novel Kunitori Monogatari (1963–1966). Shiba positioned Nobunaga as a revolutionary with a clear will, a rarity in Japanese history, and established an image of Nobunaga in which light and shadow coexisted, not only evaluating his innovativeness but also criticising his brutality.

However, he was not yet absolutely popular at the start of the serialisation and was a double starring with Akechi Mitsuhide. On the contrary, the original protagonist was his father-in-law, Saito Dōsan, and Nobunaga was not planned to appear. However, due to its popularity, Shiba was not allowed to finish the series and had no choice but to bring out Nobunaga and make it a two-part series.

In 1973, a Taiga drama based on this story was made.

Nobunaga is not the protagonist in Kurosawa Akira's film Kagemusha (1980), but he is the originator of the image of him in current fictional works, wearing a mustache, a cloak and western armour and drinking red wine. (Note: Nobunaga owned a cloak, but there is no confirmed record of him drinking wine, and Western armour was not brought to Japan until 1588, after Nobunaga's death, according to official records.)

Mayumura Taku's SF novel Toki no Tabibito: Time Stranger (1977–1978) is the originator of the plot in which a modern man travels back in time to the Sengoku period and meets Oda Nobunaga, and was made into an anime in 1986.

The anime Yōtōden (1987–1988) was the forerunner of the type of work in which the 'Demon King' Nobunaga stands in the way of the protagonists.

In video games, the branding of Nobunaga began in the 1980s with Koei's Nobunaga's Ambition series. And it was not until the 21st century that Nobunaga played the role of the Demon King in the video game world, starting with Capcom's Onimusha (2001) and Sengoku Basara (2005) and Koei's Samurai Warriors (2004). The Samurai Warriors design for Nobunaga is also seen in Pokémon Conquest (2012), known in Japan as Pokémon + Nobunaga's Ambition

By contrast, in the novel The Samurai's Tale by Erik Christian Haugaard, he is portrayed as an antagonist "known for his merciless cruelty".

Historical representations in video games (mostly Western-made strategy or action titles) include Shogun: Total War, Total War: Shogun 2, Throne of Darkness, the eponymous Nobunaga's Ambition series, as well as Civilization V, Age of Empires II: The Conquerors, Nioh, and Nioh 2. Kamenashi Kazuya of the Japanese pop group KAT-TUN wrote and performed a song titled "1582" which is written from the perspective of Mori Ranmaru during the coup at Honnō temple.

Nobunaga has also been portrayed in fiction, such as when the figure of Nobunaga influences a story or inspires a characterization. In James Clavell's novel Shōgun, the character Goroda is a pastiche of Nobunaga. In the film Sengoku Jieitai 1549, Nobunaga is killed by time-travelers. Nobunaga also appears as a major character in the eroge Sengoku Rance and is a playable character in Pokémon Conquest, with his partner Pokémon being Hydreigon, Rayquaza and Zekrom.

== Portraits and statues ==
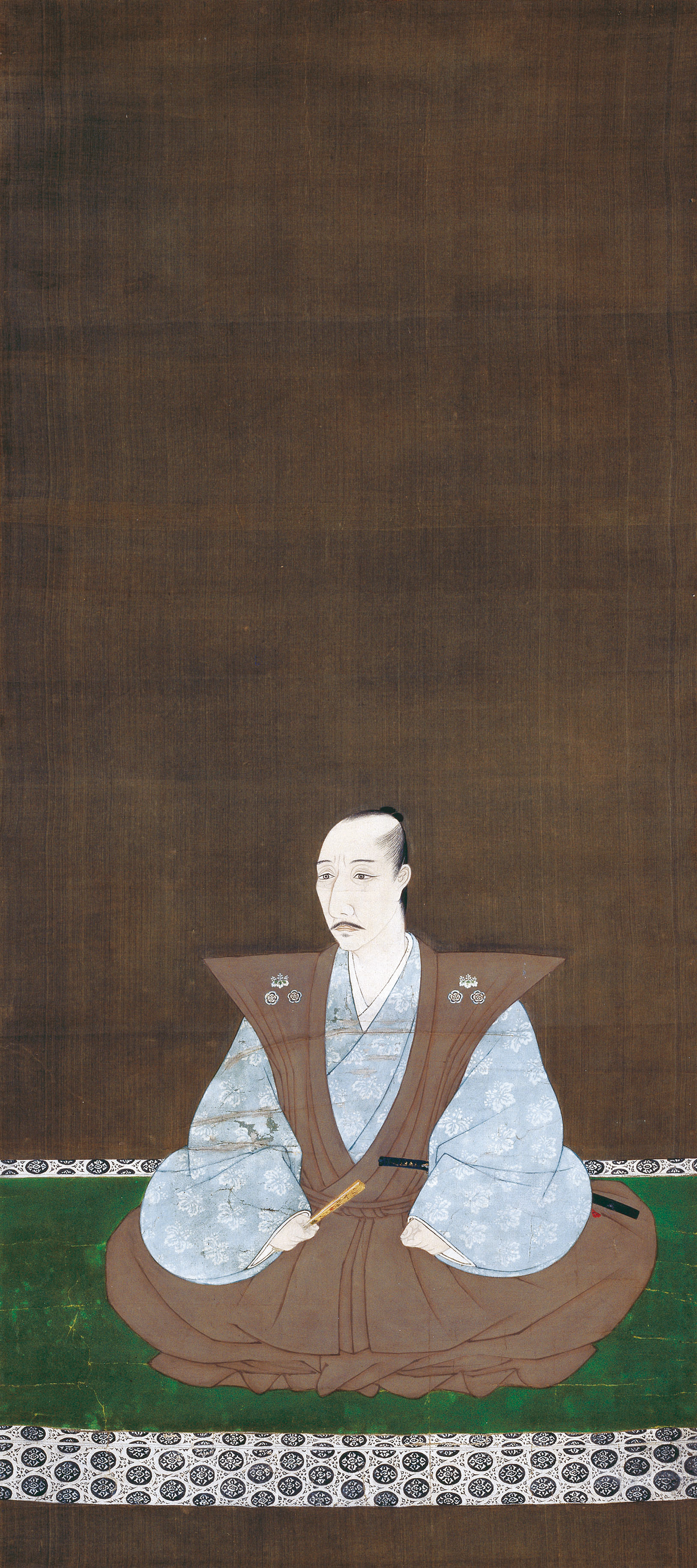
Oda Nobunaga by Kano Eitoku (Daitokuji)

The most famous portrait of Oda Nobunaga is Shihon-tyakusyoku Oda Nobunaga-zō (紙本著色織田信長像, lit. 'Portrait of Oda Nobunaga in color on paper') (Kamishimo style) by Kanō Motohide, a National Important Cultural Property, owned by Chōkō-ji in Toyota City, Aichi Prefecture. Another important cultural property is Kenpon-tyakusyoku Oda Nobunaga-zō (絹本著色織田信長像, lit. 'Portrait of Oda Nobunaga in color on silk') (Sokutai style) in the collection of the Kobe City Museum.

There are also two other portraits, one in kamishimo and the other in sokutai, painted by Kanō Eitoku, one of the leading painters of the Azuchi–Momoyama period. A 2011 survey revealed that the kamishimo used for the memorial service had been redrawn from the original painting. The picture on the front is sober, but the first picture on the back remained in coloring is a gorgeous design with different colors on the left and right of the kosode, and an extra sword. Both ends of the mustache, which were sloppily lowered in the front painting, were raised on the reverse side, giving the face a dignified appearance. It is speculated that Toyotomi Hideyoshi, who came to power after Nobunaga's death, ordered the redrawing to make Nobunaga look weak.

The wooden statue of Lord Oda Nobunaga, owned by Sōken-in of Daitoku-ji, is a seated statue of Nobunaga wearing ceremonial clothes and a sword, approximately 115 cm tall. It is said that this is one of the two wooden statues carved out of fragrant wood (agarwood) for the first anniversary of Nobunaga's death, and the other was placed in the coffin in place of Nobunaga's body, which could not be found. The ashes of the burned wooden statue were buried in place of Nobunaga's body in the Bodaiji built at Daitoku-ji.

Along with Tokugawa Ieyasu, Toyotomi Hideyoshi, and Tokugawa Mitsukuni, a gold-painted statue of Nobunaga was constructed at the entrance of the Endoji Shopping Arcade in Nagoya in 2013. In 2019, it was subjected to vandalism as the statue was found without his left arm.

== Family ==
Nobunaga first claimed that the Oda clan was descended from the Fujiwara clan, and later claimed descent from Taira no Sukemori of the Taira clan. According to the official genealogy of the Oda clan, after Taira no Sukemori was killed in the Battle of Dannoura in 1185, Taira no Chikazane, the son of Sukemori and a concubine, was entrusted to a Shinto priest at a Shinto Shrine in Otanosho in the Echizen province. This Chikazane became the founder of the Oda clan.

According to modern theories, there is no evidence that the Oda clan was descended from the Taira clan, and there is a theory that they were actually descended from the Inbe clan, who were Shinto priests in Otanosho. One theory as to why Nobunaga came to claim descent from the Taira clan is that he justified his own seizure of power by exploiting the belief at the time that the Minamoto and Taira clans were destined to alternate in power (源平交替思想, Genpei kōtai shisō). In other words, the idea was that the Minamoto clan, the shogun of the Kamakura shogunate, the Hōjō clan, descended from the Taira clan (Shikken of the Kamakura shogunate), the Ashikaga clan, descended from the Minamoto clan (shogun of the Ashikaga shogunate), and the Oda clan, descended from the Taira clan, were destined to seize power in that order.

However, there are theories that question whether the people of that time really believed in this idea, and whether the Hojo clan was really descended from the Taira clan.

=== Immediate family ===
Nobunaga was the eldest legitimate son of Oda Nobuhide, a minor warlord from Owari Province, and Tsuchida Gozen, who was also the mother to three of his brothers (Nobuyuki, Nobukane, and Hidetaka) and two of his sisters (Oinu and Oichi).

- Father: Oda Nobuhide (1510–1551)
- Mother: Tsuchida Gozen (died 1594)
- Brothers
  - Oda Nobuhiro (died 1574)
  - Oda Nobuyuki (1536–1557)
  - Oda Nobukane (1548–1614)
  - Oda Nagamasu (1548–1622)
  - Oda Nobuharu (1549–1570)
  - Oda Nobutoki (died 1556)
  - Oda Nobuoki
  - Oda Hidetaka (died 1555)
  - Oda Hidenari
  - Oda Nobuteru
  - Oda Nagatoshi
- Sisters:
  - Oichi (1547–1583)
  - Oinu, married Saji Nobukata later married Hosokawa Nobuyoshi

=== Descendants ===
Nobunaga married Nōhime, the daughter of Saitō Dōsan, in a political marriage, but records indicate that they had no children. It was his concubines, including Lady Ikoma (commonly known as Kitsuno), Lady Saka, Kyōun'in (Onabe no kata), Yōkan'in, Jitoku'in, Lady Hijikata, and Myōkō'in gave birth to his children. Kitsuno and Onabe's became Nobunaga's concubines after her husband was killed in battle, and Onabe had two sons with her former husband. Kitsuno bore Nobunaga's heir Nobutada and his second son Nobukatsu, and Saka bore his third son Nobutaka. After the death of Nobunaga and Nobutada, Nobukatsu and Nobutaka fought for Nobunaga's succession, and finally Nobutada's son Hidenobu (Sanpōshi) succeeded the head of the Oda clan.

- Lawful Wife: Sagiyama-dono (also known as Nōhime or Kichō), daughter of Saitō Dōsan
- Concubines:
  - Lady Ikoma (also known as Kitsuno), daughter of Ikoma Iemune, mother of Oda Nobutada, Nobukatsu and Toku-hime
  - Lady Saka, mother of Oda Nobutaka
  - Kyōun'in (Onabe no Kata), daughter of Takahata Genjūro, mother of Oda Nobuyoshi, Nobutaka and Ofuri, she acted practically as Nobunaga's lawful wife after he moved his base to Azuchi Castle.
  - Yokan'in, mother of Fuyu-hime, Hashiba Hidekatsu and Oda Nobuhide
  - Shunyomyōchō-daishi, mother of Ei-hime
  - Jitoku'in, relative of Takigawa Kazumasa, nanny of Oda Nobutada, birth mother of San-no-maru-dono
  - Lady Hijikata, daughter of Hijikata Katsuhisa, mother of Oda Nobusada
  - Akoko no kata, daughter of Sanjonishi Saneki
  - Myōkyō'in, sister of Ban Naomasa, mother of Nobumasa Oda
  - Otsumaki-dono, sister of Akechi Mitsuhide
- Sons
  - Oda Nobutada (1557–1582) by Kitsuno
  - Oda Nobukatsu (1558–1630) by Kitsuno
  - Oda Nobutaka (1558–1583) by Lady Saka
  - Hashiba Hidekatsu (1567–1585)
  - Oda Katsunaga (died 1582)
  - Oda Nobuhide (1571–1597)
  - Oda Nobutaka by Kyōun'in, later Toyotomi Takajuro (1576–1602) adopted by Toyotomi Hideyoshi
  - Oda Nobuyoshi by Kyōun'in, later Toyotomi Musashimori (1573–1615) adopted by Toyotomi Hideyoshi
  - Oda Nobusada (1574–1624) by Lady Hijikata
  - Oda Nobuyoshi (died 1609) was adopted by Toyotomi Hideyoshi
  - Oda Nagatsugu (died 1600)
  - Oda Nobumasa (1554–1647, illegitimate child) by Lady Harada, sister of Narada Naomasa
- Daughters
  - Tokuhime (1559–1636), by Kitsuno and married Matsudaira Nobuyasu
  - Fuyuhime (1561–1641), married Gamō Ujisato
  - Hideko (died 1632), married Tsutsui Sadatsugu
  - Eihime (1574–1623), married Maeda Toshinaga
  - Hōonin, married Niwa Nagashige
  - Sannomarudono (died 1603), by Lady Jitokuin, concubine to Toyotomi Hideyoshi, married Nijō Akizane
  - Tsuruhime, married Nakagawa Hidemasa
  - Oushin by Kyōun'in, concubine of Saji Kazunari
  - Ofuri, married Mizune Tadatane
  - Marikoji Mitsufusa's wife
  - Tokudaiji Sanehisa's wife
- Adopted children:
  - Toyama Fujin, married Takeda Katsuyori

=== Other relatives ===
One of Nobunaga's younger sisters, Oichi, gave birth to three daughters. These three nieces of Nobunaga became involved with important historical figures. Chacha (also known as Lady Yodo), the eldest, became the mistress of Toyotomi Hideyoshi. O-Hatsu married Kyōgoku Takatsugu. The youngest, O-go, married the son of Tokugawa Ieyasu, Tokugawa Hidetada (the second shogun of the Tokugawa shogunate). O-go's daughter Senhime married her cousin Toyotomi Hideyori, Lady Yodo's son.

Nobunaga's nephew was Tsuda Nobuzumi, the son of Nobuyuki. Nobuzumi married Akechi Mitsuhide's daughter and was killed after the Honnō-ji coup by Nobunaga's third son, Nobutaka, who suspected him of being involved in the plot.

=== Later descendants ===
Nobunaga's granddaughter Oyu no Kata, by his son Oda Nobuyoshi, married Tokugawa Tadanaga.

Nobunari Oda, a retired figure skater, claims to be a 17th-generation direct descendant of Nobunaga, and the ex-monk celebrity Mudō Oda also claims descent from the Sengoku period warlord, but their claims have not been verified.

== Honors ==
- Imperial Court, Senior First Rank (17 November 1917; posthumous)

== Property ==
=== Chaki (Tea utensils) ===
- Tsukumokami Nasu (九十九髪茄子)
- Matsushima (松島)
- Jō-ō Nasu (紹鴎茄子)
- Hatsuhana Katatsuki (初花肩衝)
- Fuji Nasu (富士茄子)
- Kaburanashi (蕪無)
- Komatsushima (小松島)
- Kōjiguchi (柑子口)
- Shirotenmoku (白天目)
- Mikazuki (三日月)
- Matsuhana (松花)
- Honnō-ji Bunrin (本能寺文琳)

=== Sword ===
Heshikiri Hasebe
Famous sword by sword smith 'Kunishige'. A Japanese national treasure. 'Heshikiri' means press and cut and is said to derive from an anecdote about Nobunaga pressing and cutting a chabozu who had been rude to him, including the entire cupboard in which he hid.
Yoshimoto Samonji
A trophy from the Battle of Okehazama, which belonged to Imagawa Yoshimoto when he was killed. This sword was owned by Nobunaga, then passed to Hideyoshi and Ieyasu, and was called 'the famous sword that ruled the whole country'.
Yagen Tōshirō
Matsunaga Hisahide donated it to Oda Nobunaga. It is said that it was burned down in the Honnō-ji Incident.
Dōjigiri Yasutsuna sword
Dōjigiri is one of the Five Swords under Heaven (天下五剣) made by Hōki Yasutsuna, this was the legendary sword with which Minamoto no Yorimitsu killed the boy-faced oni Shuten-dōji (酒呑童子) living near Mount Oe. It was presented to Oda Nobunaga by the Ashikaga family and was subsequently in the possession of Toyotomi Hideyoshi and Tokugawa Ieyasu.
Kotegiri Masamune sword
Kotegiri means "kote cutter". In this case kote is a contraction of yugote (弓籠手), the arm guard used by a samurai archer. This name comes from an episode in which Asakura Ujikage cut an opposing samurai's yugote in the Battle of Toji in Kyoto. Oda Nobunaga gained possession of this sword and had it shortened to its present length.

== See also ==
- Azuchi-Momoyama Period
- Sengoku Jidai
- Nobunari Oda

== Bibliography ==
- Hall, John Whitney, ed. The Cambridge History of Japan, Vol. 4: Early Modern Japan (1991) table of contents
- Jansen, Marius B. (2000). The Making of Modern Japan. Cambridge: Harvard University Press. ISBN 978-0-674-00334-7, OCLC 44090600
- Perkins, Dorothy Encyclopedia of Japan. New York, Roundtable Press, 1991
- Eisenstadt S. N. Japanese Civilization London, University of Chicago Press, 1996
- Morton W. Scott & Olenik J. Kenneth, Japan, Its History and Culture (4th ed.). United States, McGraw-Hill company, 1995
