= Siege of Inabayama Castle =

1567 siege concluding Oda Nobunaga's campaign against the Saitō clan

- Part of Sengoku period
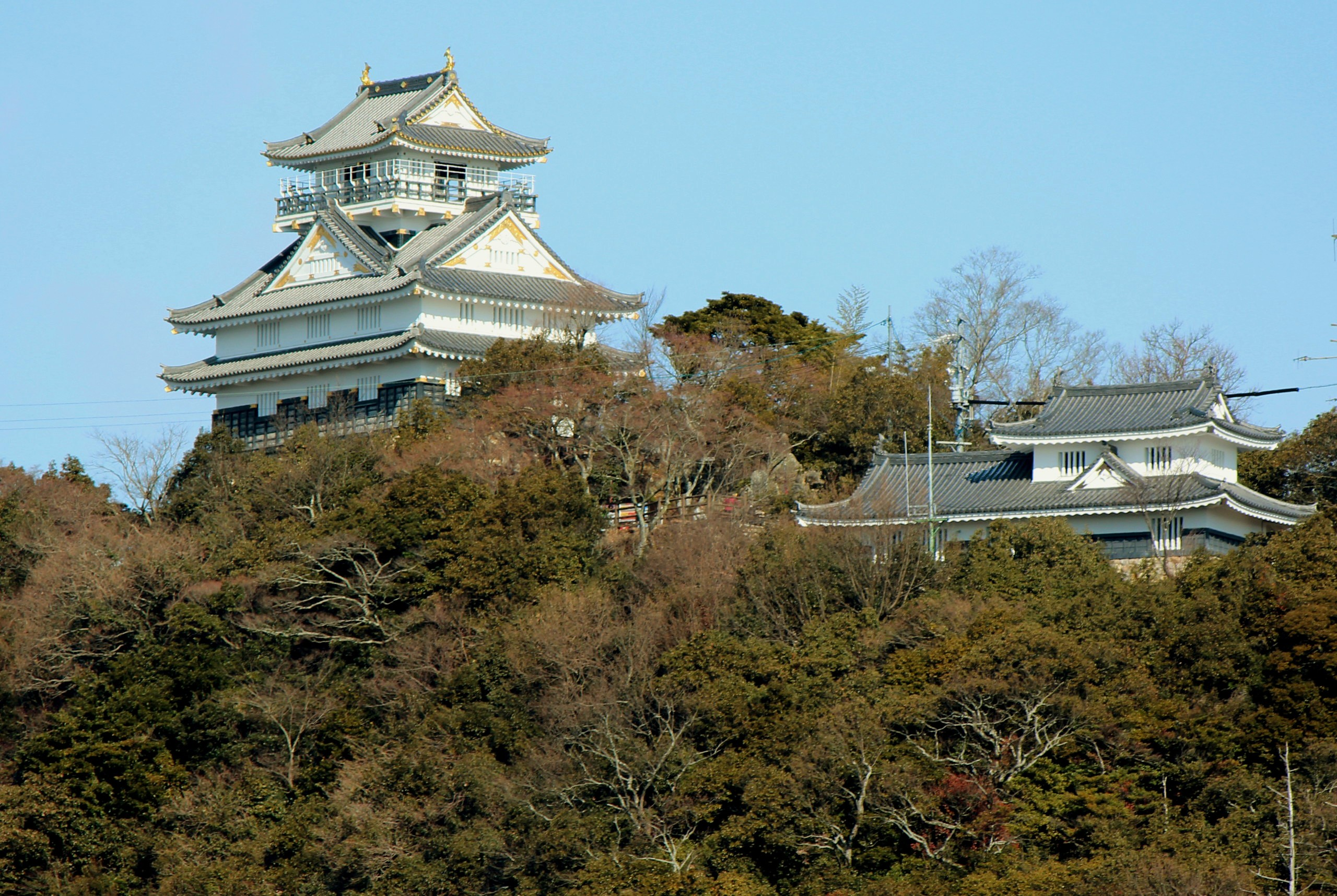
- Gifu Castle tenshu, 2012
Date	13–27 September 1567
Location	Mt. Inaba, Mino Province, Japan 35°26′02″N 136°46′56″E
Result	Oda victory

Belligerents
Oda clan	Saitō clan

Commanders and leaders
Oda Nobunaga; Kinoshita Tōkichirō	Saitō Tatsuoki; Takenaka Hanbei

Strength
13,000+	Castle garrison

The siege of Inabayama Castle (稲葉山城の戦い, Inabayama-jō no Tatakai) of 1567 was the final battle in Oda Nobunaga's campaign to defeat the Saitō clan in their mountaintop castle and conquer Mino Province, Japan.

It was a short, two-week siege, fought between 13 and 27 September 1567, or in the Japanese calendar: from the 1st to 15th day of the eighth month, in the 10th year of the Eiroku era, according to the Nobunaga Chronicle. The siege ended in a decisive battle and victory for Nobunaga's combined forces, resulting in the subjugation of the Saitō clan, their vassals, and their allies. This victory was the culmination of Nobunaga's Mino campaign, waged intermittently over the previous six years. It brought an end to the rivalry between the Oda clan of Owari Province and the Saitō clan of Mino, which began over twenty years earlier between Nobunaga's father, Oda Nobuhide and Saitō Dōsan.

Due to the weak leadership of the Saitō, many samurai leaders defected to Nobunaga before the battle, while others willingly submitted afterward. With this victory, Nobunaga took control of the expansive and fertile Mino Province and gained numerous supporters and resources. Nobunaga had Inabayama Castle repaired and renamed it Gifu Castle, a firm base from which to expand north into the Hokuriku region and to make his drive toward Kyoto. Gifu Castle functioned as his primary residence and military headquarters until he moved to the partially completed Azuchi Castle in 1575.

Nobunaga's young retainer Kinoshita Tōkichirō (later known as Toyotomi Hideyoshi) played an important role in attaining the victory at Inabayama. In the years leading to the battle, he negotiated for the support of local warlords, which ensured a ready-made army by the time of the attack, and he built a castle on the edge of the enemy's territory to serve as a staging point for the attack. In addition to these preparations, Tōkichirō devised and led a bold plan, something of a commando raid, to break into the castle and open the gates for the attacking army. As a result of his efforts and the victory, his standing with Nobunaga rose considerably. Thus, in addition to the battle's immediate importance to Nobunaga's plans, it was also an important step in Toyotomi Hideyoshi's rise to power.

== Background ==
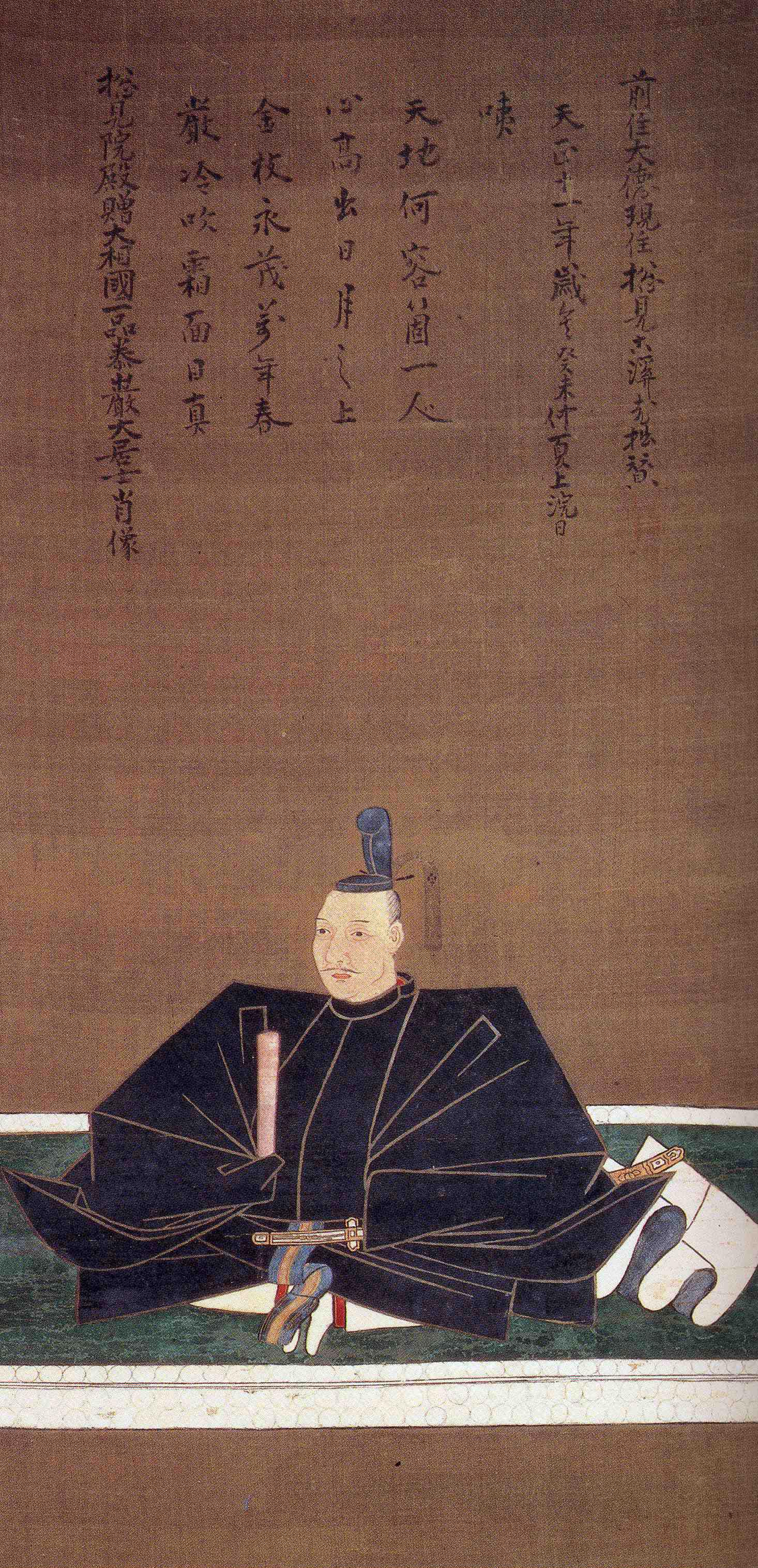
Portrait of Oda Nobunaga, circa 1583

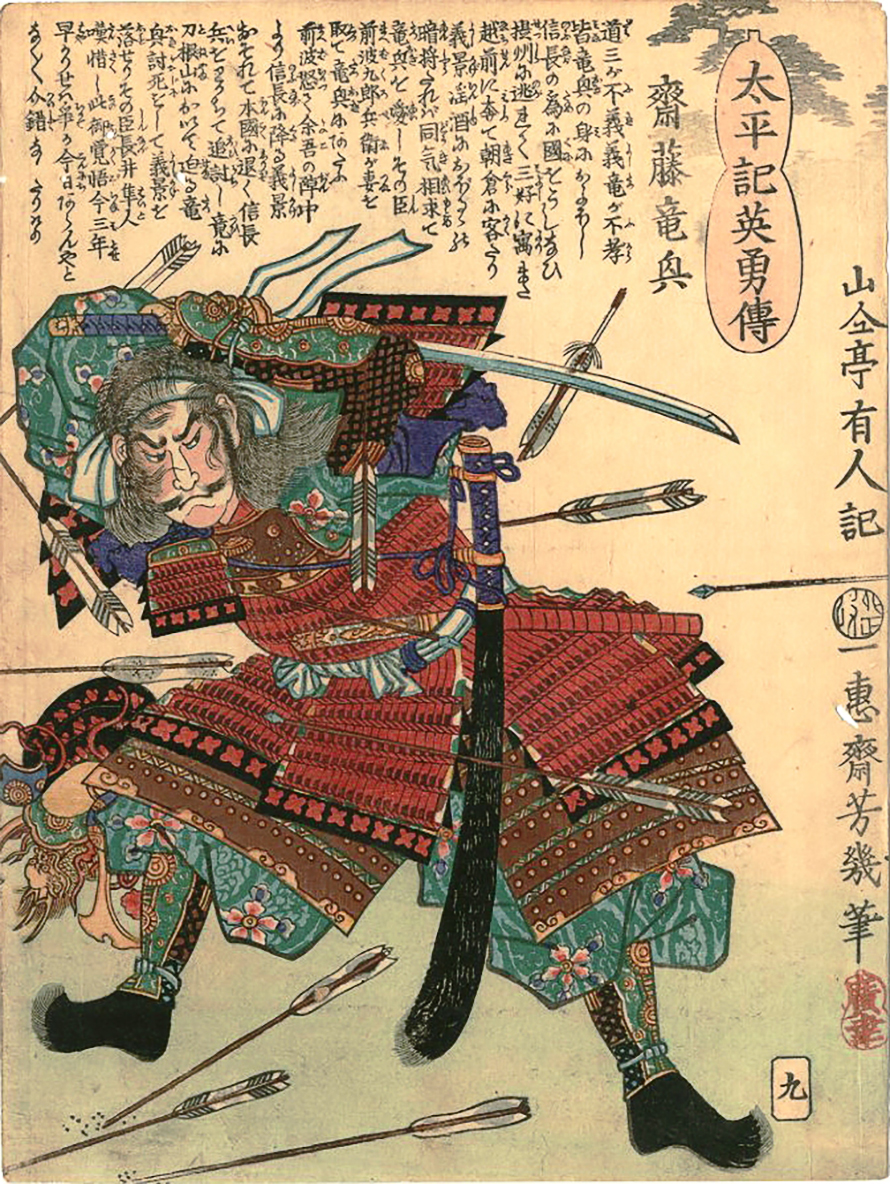
Saitō Tatsuoki, by Utagawa Yoshiiku, 19th century

In 1549, young Oda Nobunaga (1534–1582), who later became a major daimyō of Owari Province, Japan (Note: Owari Province is now the modern day city of Nagoya and western Aichi Prefecture, Japan.) and would initiate the unification of 16th century Japan, was married to Nōhime, the daughter of Saitō Dōsan, leader of the rival Saitō clan of neighboring Mino Province. Nobunaga was the second son of Oda Nobuhide, head of the Oda clan, who was at that time fending off opponents on the northern and eastern borders of Owari Province, matters that were complicated by internal dissent. Saitō Dōsan, lord of Mino, was a strong and ruthless leader, but internal strife had begun to split the Saitō into factions. Both clans needed some respite to deal with more pressing problems and thus the political marriage of Nobunaga and Nōhime brought an end to the clans' rivalry and their border skirmishes.

In 1555 Saitō Yoshitatsu, eldest son of Dōsan, came to believe his inheritance would be taken away and murdered his two younger brothers. The following year he rallied troops loyal to him and openly rebelled against his father. Dōsan indeed changed his will and named his son-in-law, Oda Nobunaga, his legal heir. Shortly thereafter Dōsan was killed by one of Yoshitatsu's retainers at the Battle of Nagaragawa. At the time Nobunaga was not in a position to help his father-in-law and the Saitō civil war soon ended before any active intervention could be mounted. In 1561 Yoshitatsu died of leprosy and his son, Saitō Tatsuoki, succeeded to the leadership of the clan. At the time Tatsuoki was young but, as he attained adulthood, he was eventually considered incapable of effective leadership by his peers and retainers, viewed with contempt by his subordinates, and even despised by the local peasantry. After the Oda defeated the Imagawa clan at the 1560 Battle of Okehazama, then allied with the Matsudaira clan soon after, Nobunaga was in a more secure position to focus on their northern neighbor, the Saitō clan. Nobunaga's plans for an invasion of Mino were ostensibly motivated by revenge for the death of his father-in-law, Saitō Dōsan, but Yoshitatsu died before Nobunaga could attack. As a result, Nobunaga reasoned that Yoshitatsu's heir, Tatsuoki, likewise benefited from Dōsan's demise, and thus continued with his plans for invasion, using revenge as a pretext.

== Mino campaign ==
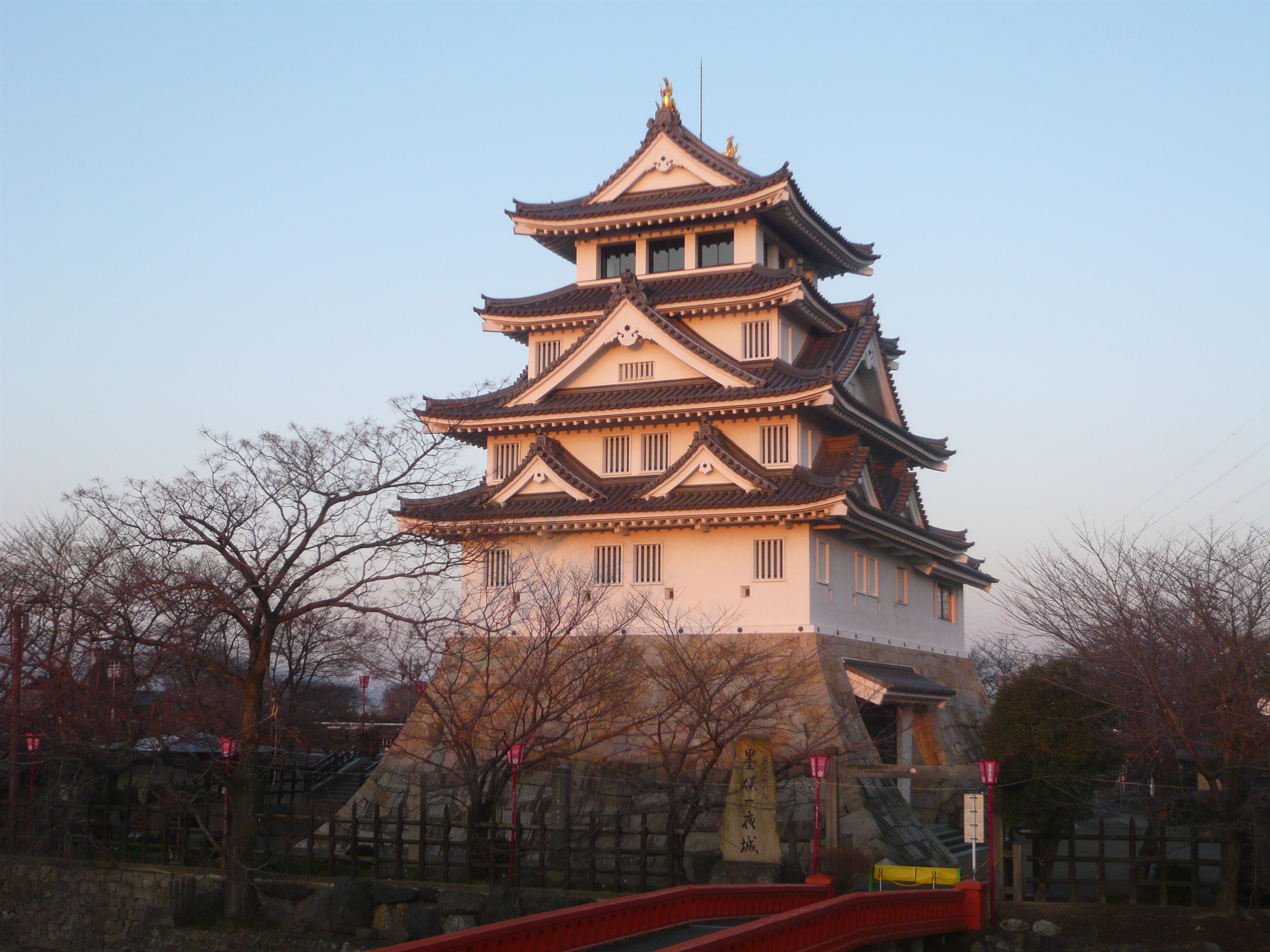
Sunomata Castle, 2008

In 1561, Nobunaga moved his base to Komaki Castle and started his campaign in Mino Province, defeating Tatsuoki in both the Battle of Moribeand the Battle of Jushijo in June of the same year.

Oda Nobunaga mounted forays into Mino territory in 1561 and 1563, which resulted in brief battles. In each expedition Nobunaga and his 700 troops were outnumbered by rapidly assembled forces under local daimyo, who would muster up to 3,000 men. Caught in the open and unable to organize a defense, he fell back each time to his home territory. The local history of Gifu city states that in 1564 Nobunaga went so far as to attack Inabayama Castle, the headquarters of the Saitō clan. The castle was situated atop Mount Inaba, which had a ruggedly steep northern face with the bank of the Sunomata River at its foot, and accessed by a winding avenue up the southern slopes. Although it was considered nearly impregnable, Tatsuoki fled the parapets and hid within the castle while his retainers Takenaka Shigeharu (called Hanbei) and Andō Morinari commanded the defense. Nobunaga then left or was driven out soon afterward. In later years Nobunaga had this setback expunged from records and omitted from the Nobunaga Chronicles.

Starting in 1564, Oda Nobunaga began dispatching his sandal-bearer and loyal retainer, Kinoshita Tōkichirō, to convince, with liberal bribes, many of the warlords in the Mino area to defect to the growing alliance under the Oda clan. Kinoshita even approached Takenaka Hanbei, who was considered a brilliant strategist but lived in pious seclusion, to persuade him to defect. Although the Saitō retainer was frustrated by the ignominious behavior of Tatsuoki, he did not want to appear capricious with his loyalty and declined Kinoshita's offers on behalf of his lord. Kinoshita was impressed by his integrity and invited him to an extended stay in his home as a guest. Hanbei admitted that the Saitō clan could not survive for much longer under Tatsuoki, and accepted Kinoshita's invitation in exchange for a promise of leniency if ever the Saitō leadership fell into Kinoshita's hands.

In 1566, in anticipation of the upcoming campaign, Kinoshita proposed that a castle should be built somewhere near Inabayama Castle to serve as a staging point for the Oda forces. Nobunaga agreed and assigned Kinoshita the task. To this end, with support from Hachisuka Koroku, Kinoshita built Sunomata Castle on the bank of the Sai River opposite Saitō territory. The advantage of the castle's proximity to the enemy was also a problem during construction. Until the castle was complete, Kinoshita's men and the construction site were vulnerable to an amphibious attack from across the river. According to legend, Kinoshita built the castle in one night; however it is more likely that it was the tower's skeleton with a facade that was seen from the opposite bank. The result of the hasty construction was meant to give his own men a vantage point and to surprise and impress the enemy. Taking advantage of the enemy's caution, Kinoshita's men were able to quickly transform the fragile framework into a functioning fortification, and then into a complete castle. Nobunaga then ordered Kinoshita to remain as steward of the castle, and bestowed upon him the name Hideyoshi.

== Siege ==
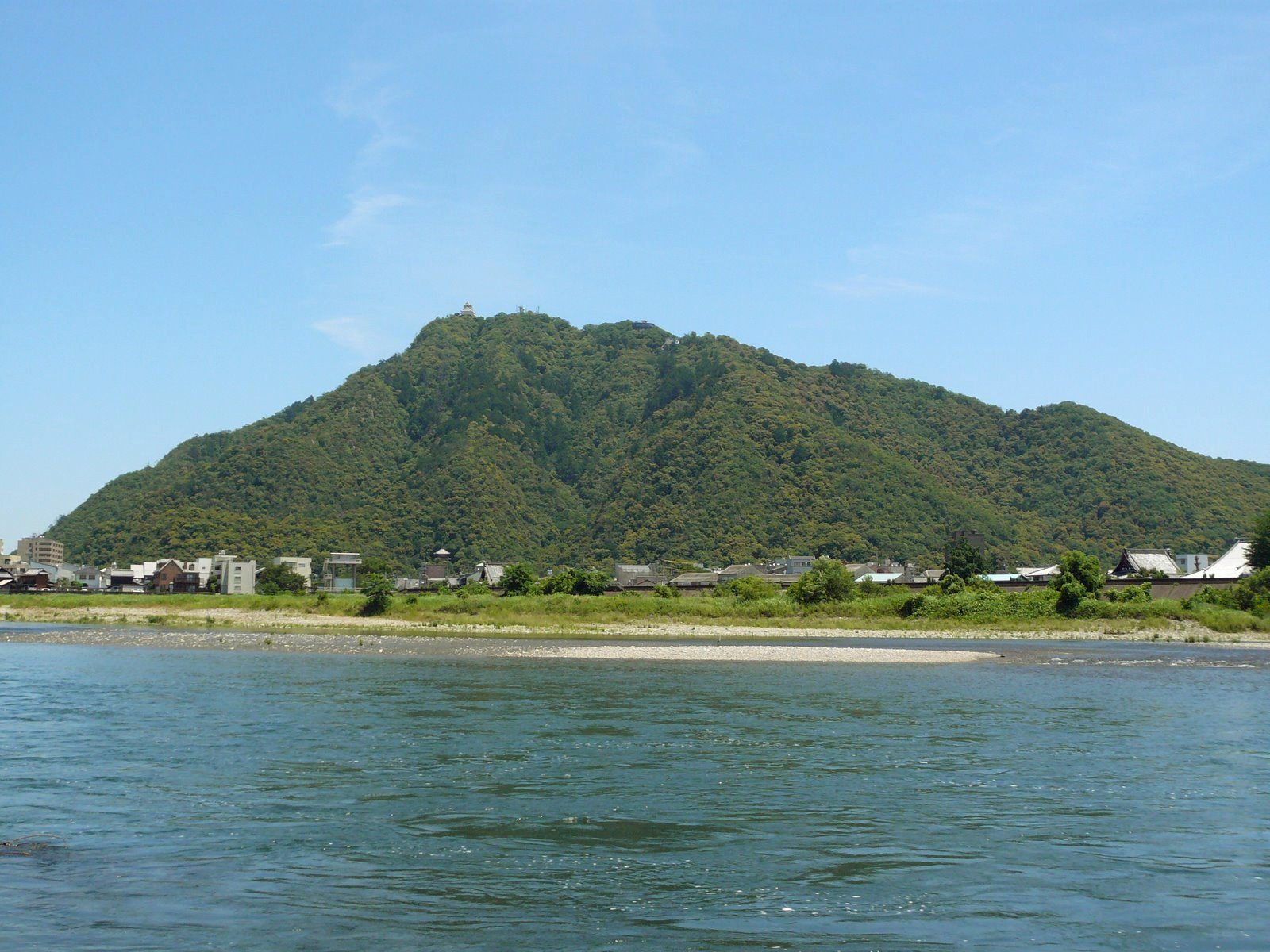
Mount Kinka, known as Inabayama at the time of the battle

In 1567, Oda Nobunaga led an attack against the Saitō clan of Mino Province. The clan headquarters and administrative center for Mino Province was Inabayama Castle, a mountain fortress atop Mount Inaba (in present-day Gifu city). As Saitō Tatsuoki, the daimyo of the clan, had shown himself to be a cowardly and ineffective ruler, Takenaka Hanbei had staged a coup and took command of the castle and its garrison. Although Tatsuoki was allowed to remain the titular head of the clan, he contributed nothing to the outcome of the battle. When the Oda army entered Mino, Hanbei prepared the garrison for the defense of the castle.

According to the Shinchō kōki (or The Nobunaga Chronicles), preparations for the battle began on 13 September 1567 (Eiroku-10 year, 8-month, 1-day). Nobunaga entered the region, made contact with allies, and the core of Nobunaga's army of about 5,000 troops crossed the Kiso River. As the troops assembled on the far shore, Nobunaga sent two messengers, Murai Sadakatsu and Shimada Hidemitsu, to three of the Saitō clan's top vassals, known as the Mino Triumvirate, asking for their cooperation in the upcoming battle. Mino warlords that Kinoshita Hideyoshi had persuaded to defect brought additional troops to Nobunaga's banner.

As the forces loyal to Nobunaga moved across the plain, several skirmishes were fought in a futile effort to repulse the invading forces. Nobunaga's forces then entered the town of Inoguchi, which lay below Inabayama Castle. To clear the field of view and provide space for the besieging army, Kinoshita Hideyoshi's vanguard set fire to the town. As some soldiers took positions on Mount Inoguchi and a nearby ridgeline, the main army positioned itself before Mount Inaba to begin the siege. The greatly augmented army, now bristling with the flags of the Saitō clan's former vassals and allies, bewildered the castle's defenders. In the days that followed, Kinoshita dispatched men to gather intelligence, especially from peasants willing to help. Kinoshita met with a local resident, Horio Yoshiharu, who showed him a little-known path that led up the north slope of the mountain. The north slopes below the castle were so steep that assault by a large force was considered impossible, and was thus effectively ignored by the defenders at the advent of battle.

=== Final assault ===
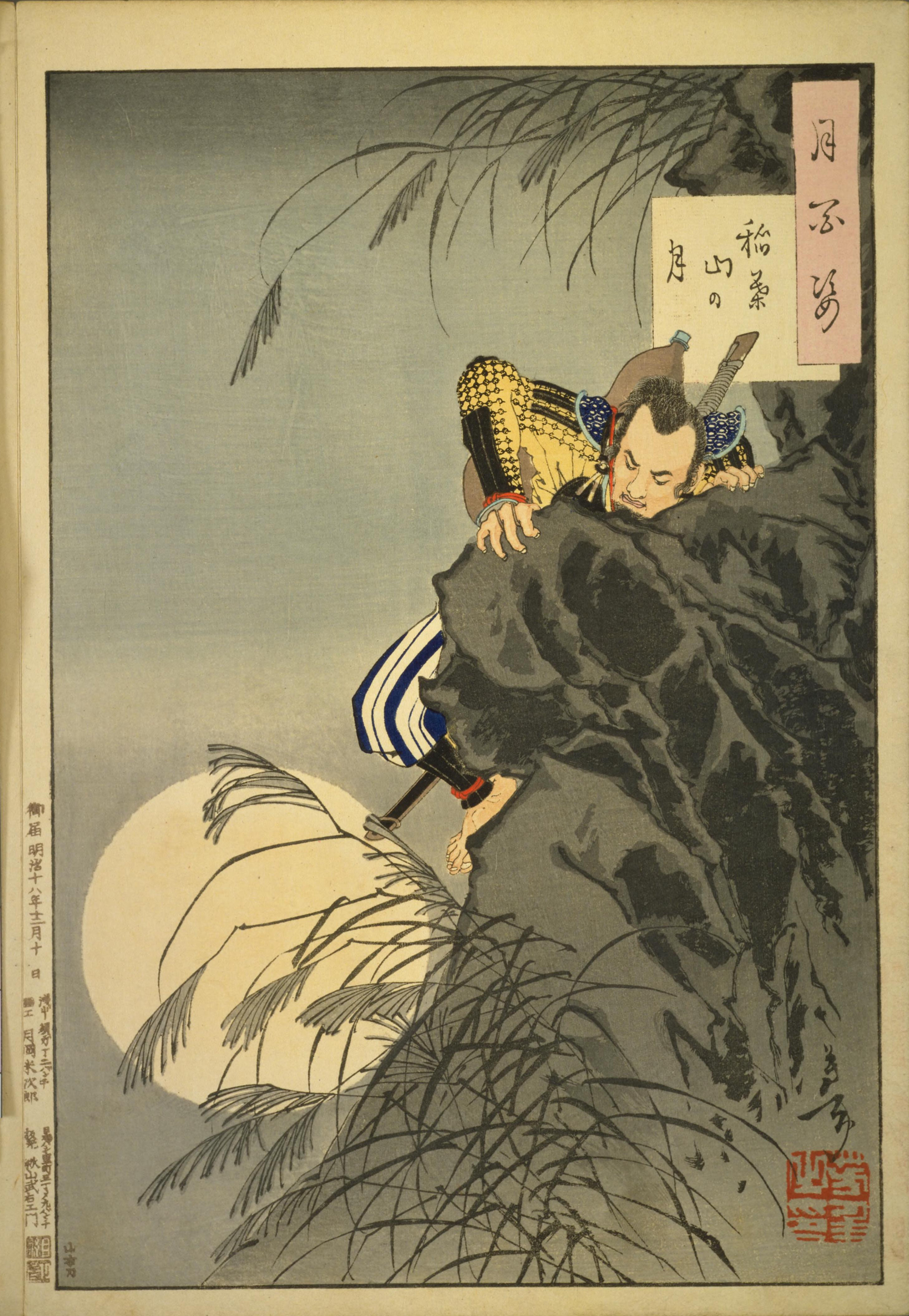
Mount Inaba Moon, by Tsukioka Yoshitoshi (1885): Kinoshita Hideyoshi climbing Mount Inaba

It is uncertain exactly what happened on the battlefield between 14 and 25 September. Given what is known of Nobunaga's aggressive fighting style, the prevailing siege tactics of the day, the layout of the Japanese castle, and the events that followed, it can be inferred that Nobunaga's forces pressed their attack and probably breached the outer defenses of Inabayama Castle. It is also certain that Kinoshita Hideyoshi devised a plan in which a small force would scale the north face of the mountain, enter the castle, and rush to open the gates for the besieging army. Nobunaga approved and charged Kinoshita with leading the raid. For his team Kinoshita selected Horio Yoshiharu, Hachisuka Koroku, and five or six other men. On 26 September Nobunaga was so confident of Kinoshita's plan and the outcome of the battle that he had an heraldic partition erected on the battlefield, where he held a meeting with his top officers and allotted tasks pertaining to the reconstruction of the castle following the battle. He also greeted the daimyo of the Mino Triumvirate, who were stunned by his audacity, and offered them sake.

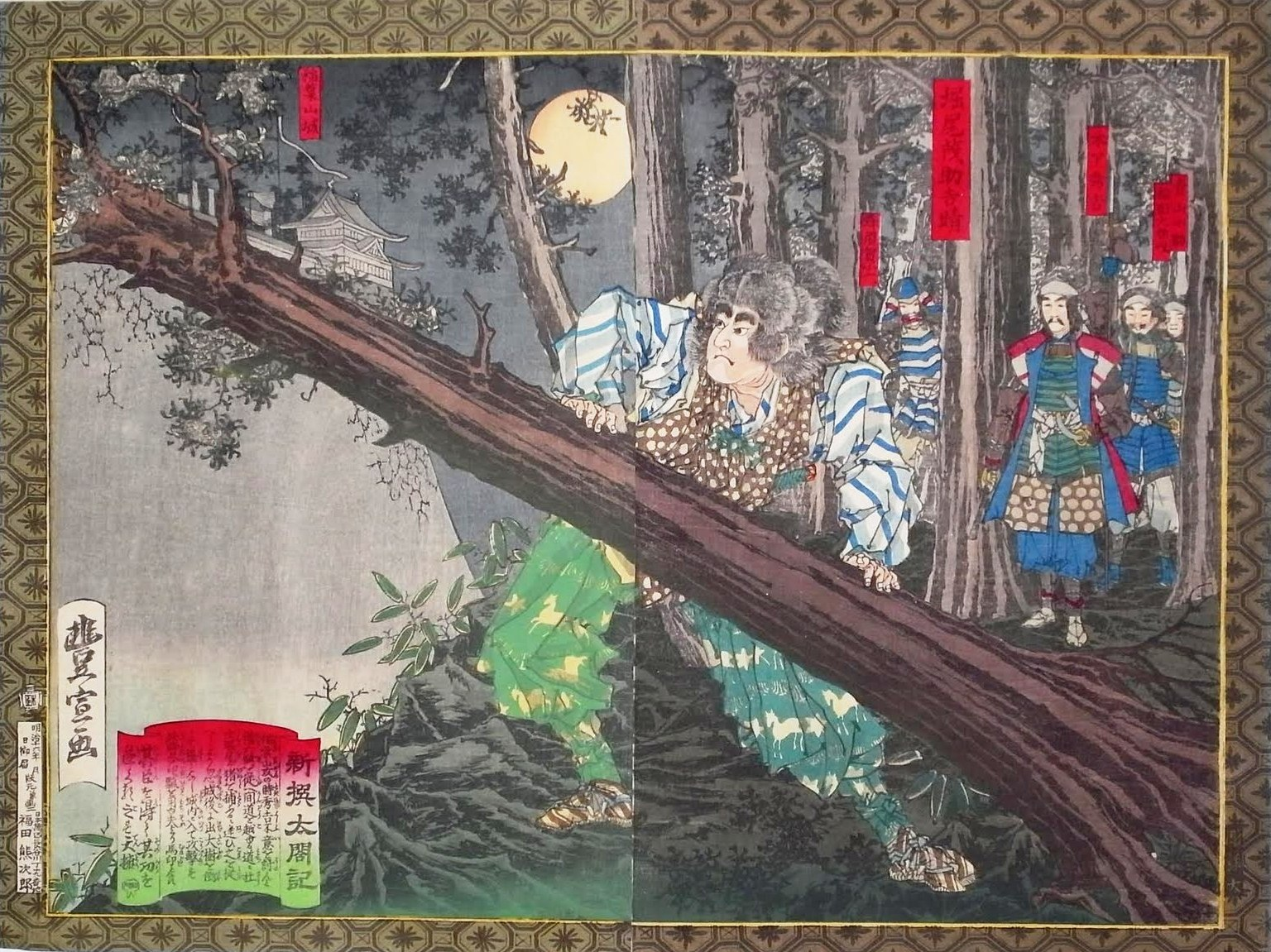
Horio Yoshiharu leading Kinoshita Hideyoshi and his team on their mission to Inabayama Castle

On the night of 26 September, Kinoshita gathered his team and, concerned over the late summer heat and the exertions in store, provided them with gourds of fresh water. Horio Yoshiharu then guided Kinoshita Hideyoshi and the small assault force around to the back of the mountain, where they climbed the steep slopes by the light of a full moon.

Sometime after dawn, Kinoshita's team infiltrated the castle, set fire to a storehouse and the powder magazine, and then rushed to open the front gates, cutting down whoever got in their way. With explosions erupting from the powder magazine and the other building burning fiercely, the castle defense quickly devolved into chaos, as the shocked and exhausted defenders thought they were under a full-scale attack from behind. Kinoshita's men, filthy from the night's exertions and brandishing bloody swords as they rushed across the main courtyard, added to the impression. The castle garrison was thrown into complete disarray as men were pulled from the parapets to face the nonexistent assault, while others threw down their weapons and surrendered. When Kinoshita's team had attained the gatehouse they tied their gourds to spears and waved them to their allies below to signal they were in position, whereupon the infantry charged the open gates and overran what was left of the castle's garrison. While the men mopped up the last of the resistance, Kinoshita's team found a place to rest, while Horio Yoshiharu passed around a large gourd of sake he had taken from the castle's supply. By the end of 27 September 1567, Inabayama Castle had fallen, and the remaining lords of Mino province formally surrendered to Nobunaga.

== Aftermath ==
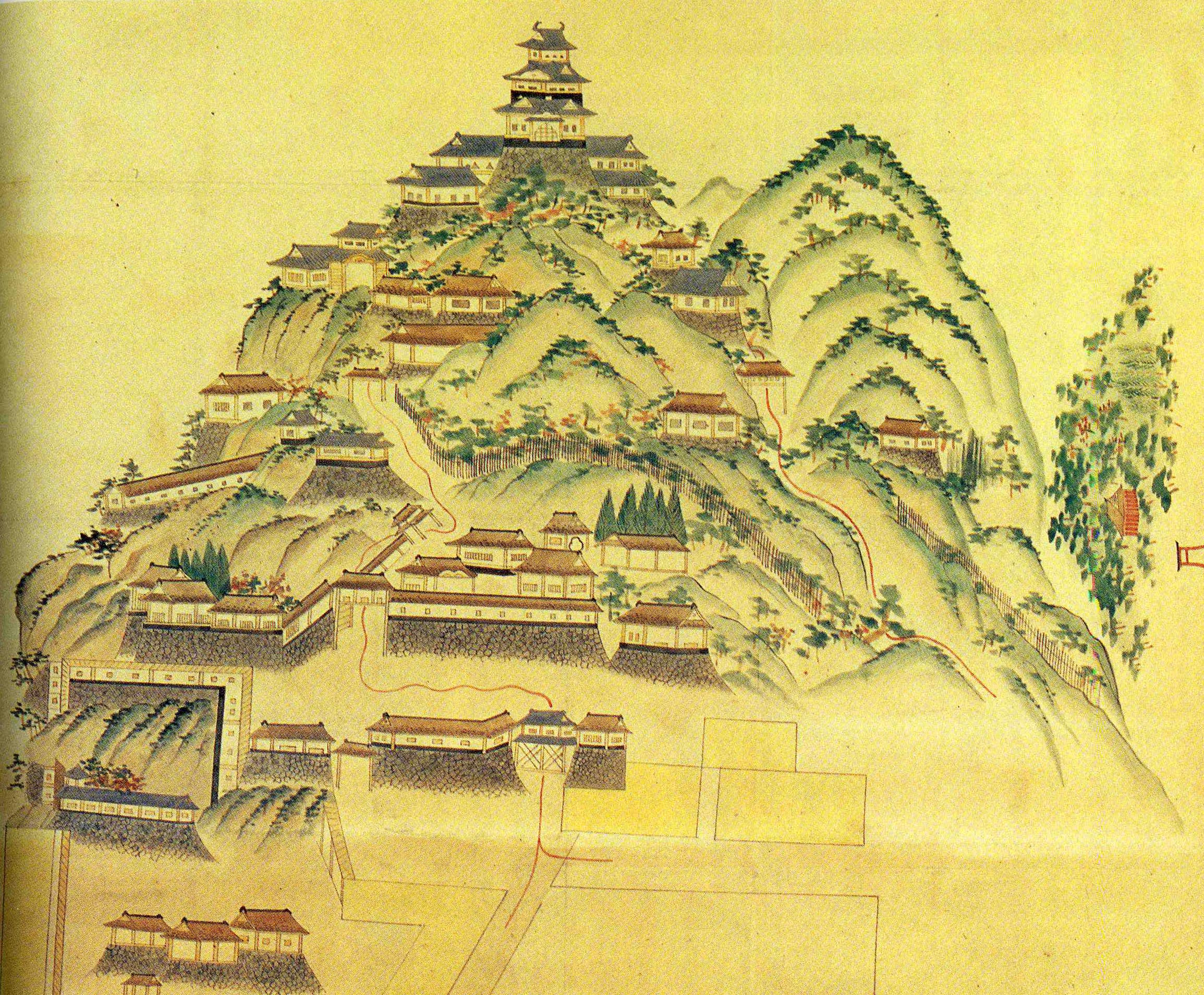
Edo period map of Gifu Castle

In about two weeks' time Nobunaga had entered the sprawling Mino Province, raised an army, and conquered the ruling clan in their mountaintop castle. Following the battle, the Mino Triumvirate, awed by the speed and skill of Nobunaga's conquest, permanently allied themselves to Nobunaga. Nobunaga had the castle repaired and renamed it Gifu Castle. The castle-town of Inoguchi was likewise renamed Gifu, after the mountain from which Wu Wang launched his campaign to unify China. Nobunaga had a lavish manor built at the base of the castle mountain. He then transferred his primary base and residence from Komaki Castle to Gifu, from which he would launch his historic march on Kyoto the following year. He continued to use Gifu Castle as his primary residence and headquarters until he moved into the partially completed Azuchi Castle in 1575.

Saitō Tatsuoki survived the battle, though there are at least two accounts of how he managed this. In one account, Tatsuoki abandoned the castle the night before the final attack, took a boat, and fled down the Sunomata River. In another account, following the breach of the main gate, Hideyoshi dispatched a messenger to the main tower, where Tatsuoki and his entourage were cornered, with assurances of leniency if the Saitō holdouts would surrender. Tatsuoki accepted the offer and, with Nobunaga's troops forming two lines, Tatsuoki marched out of the main tower with his family and retinue. In any event, Tatsuoki eventually found his way to Nagashima, Ise Province. He lived in exile for a while, but eventually sought refuge with Asakura Yoshikage. He was killed in the Battle of Tonezaka, at the age of 26, in 1573.

The efforts of Kinoshita Hideyoshi as the mastermind of the victory were recognized by Nobunaga and his status rose accordingly. After the battle, Kinoshita was promoted in rank and made lord of three districts in the northern part of the newly conquered Mino province, and not long afterward took the surname Hashiba. When Nobunaga later gave him a field command, Hideyoshi used an image of a golden gourd as his battle standard in commemoration of his success at Inabayama Castle. In time he would change his surname again, to Toyotomi.

== Order of battle ==
At the outset of the siege, Nobunaga organized the troops of his allies and retainers into several divisions, with a reserve and a vanguard:

- Main Division
  - 3,000 troops under Oda Nobunaga and Niwa Nagahide
- First Division
  - 2,000 troops under Shibata Katsuie
  - 2,000 troops under Ikeda Tsuneoki
- Second Division
  - 1,000 troops under Mori Yoshinari
  - 1,000 troops under Maeda Toshiie
  - 1,000 troops under Sassa Narimasa
- Reserve Division
  - 2,000 troops under Sakuma Nobumori
- Vanguard
  - 1,000 troops under Kinoshita Hideyoshi
- "Mino Triumvirate" forces, unspecified numbers under:
  - Ujiie Naotomo
  - Andō Morinari
  - Inaba Yoshimichi
- Others

== See also ==
- Battle of Gifu Castle (1600)

== Bibliography ==
- Berry, Mary Elizabeth (1982). Hideyoshi. Harvard University Press. ISBN 0-674-39026-1.
- Brinkley, Frank; Kikuchi, Dairoku (1915). A History of the Japanese People: From the Earliest Times to the End of the Meiji Era. New York: The Encyclopædia Britannica, Co.
- Dening, Walter (1904). A New Life of Toyotomi Hideyoshi. Tokyo: Kyobun-kwan.
- Dening, Walter; Dening, M. E. (1930). The Life of Toyotomi Hideyoshi (3rd ed.). Kobe, Japan: J.L. Thompson & Co.
- Gifu Prefecture Department of Education (1969). History of Gifu Prefecture: The Complete Overview of History [岐阜県史 通史編 中世]. Vol. Middle Ages. Gifu Prefecture Press.
- Hall, John Whitney, ed. (1991). The Cambridge History of Japan. Vol. 4: Early Modern Japan. Cambridge University Press.
- Harada, Minoru 原田実 (2007). "Toyotomi Hideyoshi Built Mino-Sunomata Castle in One Night!! 豊臣秀吉は美濃墨俣に一夜城を築いた!!". The Truth of Outrageous Japanese History and Lectures on Falsified History in Academia トンデモ日本史の真相 と学会的偽史学講義. Bungeisha. pp. 29–42. ISBN 978-4-286-02751-7.
- Harimaya (10 July 2010). "Takenaka Clan" [竹中氏 – 戦国大名探究]. Warring States Daimyo Search (in Japanese).
- Jansen, Marius (2000). The Making of Modern Japan. Harvard University Press. ISBN 978-0-674-00334-7.
- Nakayama, Yoshiaki 中山良昭 (2007). Japanese Castles [日本の城]. もう一度学びたい (in Japanese). Seitosha. ISBN 978-4-7916-1421-9.
- Ōta, Gyuichi 太田牛一 (2003). "Beginning Chapter". Shincho Kouki 信長公記 [The Nobunaga Chronicles] (PDF) (in Japanese). Archived from the original (PDF) on 24 September 2015.
- Saitō, Hideo 斎藤秀夫 (May 2007). Traveler's Journal of Japanese Castles [日本城紀行] (in Japanese). Tokyo: Choeisha. ISBN 978-4-86265-058-0.
- Sansom, George (1961). A History of Japan, 1334–1615. Stanford, CA: Stanford University Press.
- Soda, Kouichi 祖田浩一 (1991). "Nobunaga and Battle: Attack on Inabayama Castle 信長と合戦：稲葉山城攻め". 事典信長をめぐる５０人 [Encyclopedia of 50 People that Influenced Nobunaga]. Tokyo: Tokyo Doushuppan 東京堂出版.
- Turnbull, Stephen (2010). Toyotomi Hideyoshi: Leadership, Strategy, Conflict. Osprey Publishing.
- Weston, Mark (1999). Giants of Japan: The Lives of Japan's Greatest Men and Women. New York: Kodansha International. ISBN 1-56836-286-2.
