= Fuwa Mitsuharu =

- 不破 光治
- Born: Mino Province
- Died: December 14, 1583; Echizen Province
- Children: Fuwa Naomitsu
- Military career
- Allegiance: Saitō clan Oda clan
- Commands: Ryūmonji Castle
- Conflicts: Siege of Ōkawachi; Shiga Campaign; Ise-Nagashima Campaign; Siege of Katano; Siege of Makishima; Siege of Ichijōdani Castle; Echizen Campaign; Kaga Campaign; Siege of Arioka; Tensho Iga War; Etchu Campaign

Fuwa Mitsuharu (不破 光治; died December 14, 1583) was a Japanese samurai of the Sengoku and Azuchi-Momoyama periods. Originally a retainer of Saitō Dōsan, Mitsuharu went on to serve Oda Nobunaga, he received a land in Echizen Province and became a member of the so-called Echizen Sanninshu (Echizen Triumvir) along with Maeda Toshiie and Sassa Narimasa.

== Early life ==
Mitsuharu served as the lord of Nishinoho Castle in Mino Province and, from early on as a retainer of the Saitō clan, the sengoku daimyō of Mino. Along with Inaba Yoshimichi, Andō Morinari, and Ujiie Naotomo, Mitsuharu was known as one of the "Western Mino Group of Four". Unlike the other three, Mitsuharu was said to have remained loyal to the Saitō until the end, but after the Saitō were eliminated, he served Oda Nobunaga.

According to one secondary source from the Genroku era in the Edo period, Mitsuharu went to Odani Castle in Ōmi Province, and, following consultations with a retainer of the Azai clan named Anyōji Keisei, arranged for the engagement of Nobunaga’s younger sister, Oichi, to Azai Nagamasa. Mitsuharu, along with Naitō Shōsuke, attended her bridal procession.

== Military life ==
In 1568, after Nobunaga responded to pleas from Ashikaga Yoshiaki (who was under the protection of Asakura Yoshikage of Echizen) to march upon Kyōto, Mitsuharu, together with Wada Koremasa, Matsui Sadakatsu, and Shimada Hidemitsu, headed toward Echizen to meet Yoshiaki. After capturing Kōhoku in the battle for the capital, Mitsuharu was sent to meet Yoshiaki who was waiting at the Ryūshō Temple.

Thereafter, Mitsuharu participated in the Siege of Ōkawachi Castle in 1569, an attack on Odani Castle and the Shiga Campaign in 1570, an offensive in Ise-Nagashima in 1571, an encirclement of enemy forces at Katano Castle in 1572, the Siege of Makishima Castle, and the Siege of Ichijōdani Castle in 1573.

In 1574, after the killing of Maeba Yoshitsugu of Echizen, Mitsuharu deployed with Hashiba Hideyoshi and Niwa Nagahide to Tsuruga and participated in a subsequent offensive in Ise-Nagashima.

In 1575, Mitsuharu participated in the attack of Echizen Ikkō-ikki. After this campaign, Oda Nobunaga awarded Shibata Katsuie control of eight districts in Echizen. Together with Sassa Narimasa and Maeda Toshiie, Mitsuharu governed two districts in Fuchū in Echizen while also serving as metsuke, or overseers, for Katsuie. These three individuals were referred to as the "Fuchū Group of Three". Mitsuharu resided in Ryūmonji Castle in Echizen.

In 1577, Owing to ongoing battles against the Kaga Ikkō-ikki and Uesugi Kenshin, their service as yoriki, or security forces, for Katsuie, became increasingly notable. Each one of the "Fuchū Group of Three" joined in a battle to pacify ikki forces in Kaga under Katsuie as their commander-in-chief.

In 1581, Mitsuharu joined Toshiie and others in the Kyōto Mounted Horse Parade as one of the bushō in the Echizen group led by Katsuie, but reports arrived that Uesugi Kagekatsu had invaded Etchū Province and surrounded Koide Castle, so those from the Echizen group under the command of Katsuie were ordered to deploy.

Nevertheless, Mitsuharu was not entirely wed to the command of Shibata Katsuie, mobilizing for the Saika Offensive in 1577, the Siege of Arioka Castle in 1579, a deployment to Etchū, Kaga and the Iga Offensive in 1581.

== Death ==
Mitsuharu died in Echizen Province, but there are various theories concerning the date, around 1580-1583. Mitsuharu was succeeded by his son, Fuwa Naomitsu.
