= Saitō Toshikazu =

- 齋藤 俊一

Lord of Ikuchiyama Castle
- In office 1567–1582

Personal details
- Born: Mino Province
- Died: July 2, 1582 Battle of Yamazaki

Military service
- Allegiance: Saito clan Oda clan Akechi clan
- Commands: Ikuchiyama Castle
- Battles/wars: Siege of Inabayama (1567); Tanba Campaign (1575); Battle of Yamazaki (1582)

Saitō Toshikazu (齋藤俊一) (died 1582), also known as Saitō Toshizo (斎藤歳三), was lord of Ikuchiyama in Tanba Province as well as a member of the Saitō clan. Toshikazu was Saito Tatsuoki cousin, head of Saitō clan.

In 1567, after the Battle of Inabayama, Toshikazu became a vassal of Akechi Mitsuhide, who was a retainer of the Oda clan.

In 1582, at the Battle of Yamazaki, the battle between Oda Nobunaga's two de facto successors, Akechi Mitsuhide and Toyotomi Hideyoshi. Toshikazu became a commander of Akechi clan forces. During the battle, he tried to flank Hideyoshi's lines but was defeated and executed by Horio Mosuke.

== See also ==
- Saitō Toshimitsu
