= Sakuma Nobumori =

Retainer for the Oda clan (1528–1582)

- 佐久間 信盛
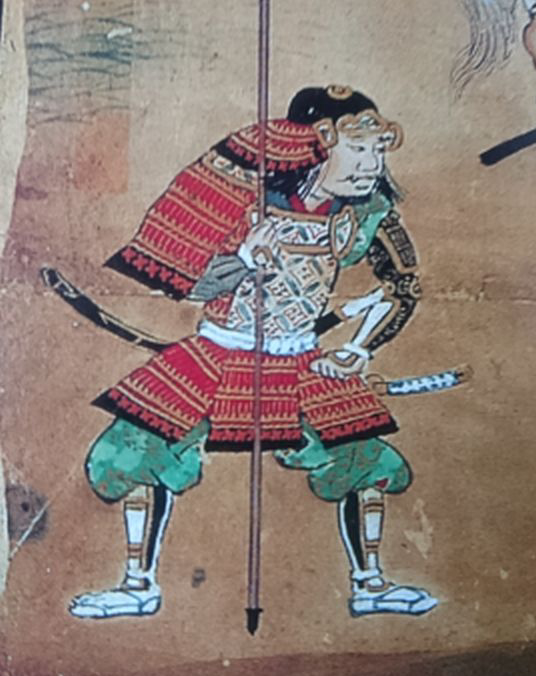

Lord of Kurita
- In office 1571–1580

Personal details
- Born: 1528 Minami-ku, Nagoya, Owari Province
- Died: 18 February 1582 (aged 53–54) Totsugawa, Yamato Province
- Nickname(s): "Shirizoki Sakuma" "Retreating Sakuma" (Noki Sakuma)

Military service
- Allegiance: Oda clan
- Commands: Kurita District, Shiga
- Battles/wars: Battle of Kanōguchi; 2nd Battle of Azukizaka; Battle of Ino; Battle of Okehazama; Siege of Inabayama; Siege of Choko-ji; Siege of Mitsukuri Castle; Siege of Nagashima; Siege of Mount Hiei; Battle of Mikatagahara; Siege of Ichijodani Castle; Battle of Nagashino; Siege of Ishiyama-Honganji

Sakuma Nobumori (佐久間 信盛, also Dewa no Suke (出羽介) and Uemon no Jo (右衛門尉); 1528 – February 18, 1582) was a Samurai retainer of Oda Nobuhide. He was treated as Oda Nobunaga's most important retainer and would come to fight in every important battle under Nobunaga's command such as the 1567 siege of Inabayama Castle, the 1571 and 1573 sieges of Nagashima.

== Early life ==
Nobumori was head of the Sakuma clan. He was born in what is now Minami-ku, Nagoya (situated in contemporary Aichi District, Owari Province) and served under Oda Nobuhide. Sakuma was entrusted with the care of the young Oda Nobunaga, although he briefly supported Oda Nobuyuki in Battle of Ino and Nobuyuki failed attempt at rebellion in 1557.

Sakuma was called Noki Sakuma (退き佐久間) or "Shirizoki Sakuma", which literally means "retreating Sakuma", for his excellence in directing the rear guard.

== Military life ==
In 1547, Nobumori fought at the Battle of Kanōguchi against Saitō Dōsan.

In 1548, Nobumori took part in the second Battle of Azukizaka against Imagawa clan.

In 1555, Nobumori took part in the Battle of Ino, against Oda Nobunaga, older brother of Nobuyuki. However, in 1557, he changed side to Nobunaga, after Nobuyuki fail, Nobunaga forgave him.

In 1560, he led one of Nobunaga main forces at the Battle of Okehazama against Imagawa Yoshimoto.

In 1567, he fought in the siege of Inabayama Castle against Saito Tatsuoki from the Saitō clan where he was in the reserve division.

In 1570, he was successful in attacking Mitsukuri castle in the campaign against the Rokkaku clan and helped to suppress rebellions caused by Buddhist sects in Echizen Province.

In 1571, Nobumori fought against the Ikkō-ikki rebellion in the sieges of Nagashima. He also set fire and burnt down Enryakuji at the siege of Mount Hiei. Nobumori was given Kurita County, Omi Province as chigyo-chi (household territory) in November 1571.

In 1572, he and Takigawa Kazumasu led a 3,000-man unit as part of the reinforcements dispatched by Nobunaga to aid Tokugawa Ieyasu's approximately 8,000 soldiers against the 30,000 led by Takeda Shingen in the Battle of Mikatagahara. Sakuma retreated after a preliminary engagement. However, his fellow commander Hirate Hirohide, who fought alongside the Tokugawa troops, lost his life, and the conflict ended with a crushing defeat of the Tokugawa-Oda alliance.

In 1573, he participated in the siege of Ichijōdani Castle against the Asakura clan and the second siege of Nagashima.

In 1574, he participated in the third siege of Nagashima, resulting in the complete destruction of the entire fortress complex; no one escaped or survived.

In 1575, he participated in the Battle of Nagashino against the Takeda clan.

In 1576, after Harada Naomasa's death during the campaign against the heavily fortified and well-supplied Honganji temple in Osaka, Sakuma was chosen as Harada's replacement as commander of the Siege of Ishiyama Hongan-ji and given troops from seven provinces placing him in command of the largest Oda-clan army among the Oda retainers. However, unlike his colleagues Akechi Mitsuhide, Shibata Katsuie or Hashiba Hideyoshi who all won battles on the fronts to which they were assigned, Nobumori made no progress against the Buddhist zealots.

In 1580, after ten years of warring in the Ishiyama Hongan-ji War, Nobunaga had the emperor mediate a truce to end the war. That same year, Nobunaga drafted a document containing a nineteen-point accusation against Sakuma, including past failures against the Honganji. Nobunaga banished Sakuma and his son Sakuma Nobuhide to the temple on Mount Koyasan, where they were forced to spend their days in the monk lifestyle. The man who came to lead the largest force in the Kinki area (Kansai) after Nobumori's banishment was Akechi Mitsuhide, and along with the severe human affairs which brought unrest to the vassals, this banishment was often said to be linked to Nobunaga's death at the Honnoji Incident.

== Death ==
Nobumori died in 1582 at Totsugawa in Yamato Province. He was posthumously named Doumu Keigan (洞無桂巌) and Souyu (宗佑).

Nobumori's banishment has widely been regarded as representative of Nobunaga's cold-blooded treatment against even his longest-serving retainers underscoring the clan leader's shortcomings as a military commander.

Nobumori, however, had reportedly held frequent tea parties and seemed more interested in these rather than focusing on military affairs. He never devised any overarching military measures against the Honganji, even though their war had remained in a stalemate. It has also been recorded that since childhood, Nobumori had been openly critical of Nobunaga.

== Family ==
- Sakuma Nobuhide (Ja:佐久間信栄): Son
