= Mino Triumvirate =

The Mino Triumvirate (西美濃三人衆, Nishi-Mino Sanninshū, lit. Western Mino's Order of the Three) was commanded by three Japanese samurai generals serving Saitō clan during the Sengoku Period.

- Ujiie Naotomo also known as Ujiie Bokuzen
- Andō Morinari also known as Andō Michitari
- Inaba Yoshimichi also known as Inaba Ittetsu

They had served under Saitō Dōsan, Saitō Yoshitatsu, Saitō Tatsuoki and later served under the command of Oda Nobunaga.
