= Hirate =

Hirate (written: 平手) is a Japanese surname. Notable people with the surname include:

- Hirate Hirohide (平手 汎秀, 1553–1572), Japanese samurai
- Kohei Hirate (平手 晃平, born 1986), Japanese racing driver
- Hirate Masahide (平手 政秀, 1492–1553), Japanese samurai
- Norio Hirate (平手 則男, born 1948), Japanese speed skater
- Yurina Hirate (平手 友梨奈, born 2001), Japanese singer and idol
