= Akaza Shichirōemon =

- Died: 1582
- Era: Sengoku period

Akaza Shichirōemon (赤座 七郎右衛門; died 1582) was a retainer beneath the Oda clan throughout the late Sengoku period of Feudal Japan. Shichiroemon was a vassal of the Saitō clan, recorded serving Saitō Tatsuoki, and then passed his loyalties onto Oda Nobunaga after Tatsuoki died.

In the year 1569 he served with distinction in the battles waged against the Miyoshi clan, and was awarded lands in the Echizen province. However, in 1582, at the time of the tragic loss at the Honnō-ji—the Incident at Honnō-ji—Shichiroemon was killed at Nijo Gosho.
