= Battle of Kanōguchi =

Battle of Kanōguchi 加納口の戦い
- Part of Saitō-Oda feud
Date	November 4, 1547
Location	Mino Province
Result	Saitō clan victory

Belligerents
Saitō clan	Oda clan

Commanders and leaders
Saitō Dōsan; Mori Yoshinari	Oda Nobuhide; Toki Yorinari; Shibata Katsuie; Sakuma Nobumori

Casualties and losses
	5,000 men (including Oda Nobuyasu)

The Battle of Kanōguchi (加納口の戦い, Kanōguchi no Tatakai) was a battle during the Sengoku period (16th century) of Japan. As part of the very long rivalry between Oda Nobuhide and Saitō Dōsan, along with Dōsan's defense of his position in Mino Province.

Nobuhide and Dōsan fought each other on the battlefield in Kanōguchi. Nobuhide, who was the father of the famous Oda Nobunaga, ended in defeat, with the loss of two of his very close relatives. Following Nobuhide's defeat, Dōsan's name greatly spread throughout Japan.

Peace was reached between the two clans when they made a deal for Nobunaga to marry Nōhime, Dōsan's daughter.
