= Ujiie Yukihiro =

- Born: 1546
- Died: 4 June 1615 (aged 69)
- Occupation(s): Samurai, Feudal lord
- Spouse: Kyōgoku Takayoshi's daughter
- Parent: Ujiie Naotomo (father)
- Relatives: Ujiie Naomasa (eldest brother); Ujiie Yukitsugu (younger brother)

Ujiie Yukihiro (氏家 行広; 1546 – 4 June 1615) was a samurai and feudal lord who lived in the Sengoku period up to the beginning of the Edo period, also known as Ogino Douki (荻野道喜). He was the son of Ujiie Naotomo.

== Biography ==
Yukihiro was the second son of Ujiie Naotomo, one of the Mino Triumvirate. His eldest brother was Ujiie Naomasa, and his youngest brother was Ujiie Yukitsugu.

After his father's death at the first siege of Nagashima in 1571, his elder brother, Ujiie Naomasa, succeeded him as the head of the Ujiie family and kept serving under Oda Nobunaga. After the Incident at Honnō-ji, the Ujiie family served Nobunaga's third son Nobutaka, but when Nobutaka opposed Hashiba Hideyoshi, they turned to serve Hideyoshi. Due to Naomasa's death by illness in 1583, Yukihiro became the head of the Ujiie family.

He served Toyotomi Hideyoshi and was given a fief in Ise province. He fought for Ishida Mitsunari in the Battle of Sekigahara and was afterwards dispossessed.

== Death ==
In 1614, he went to join the defenders of Osaka Castle and was killed at the conclusion of the Osaka Summer Campaign.
