= Hachisuka Masakatsu =

Japanese daimyō (1526–1586)

- 蜂須賀 正勝
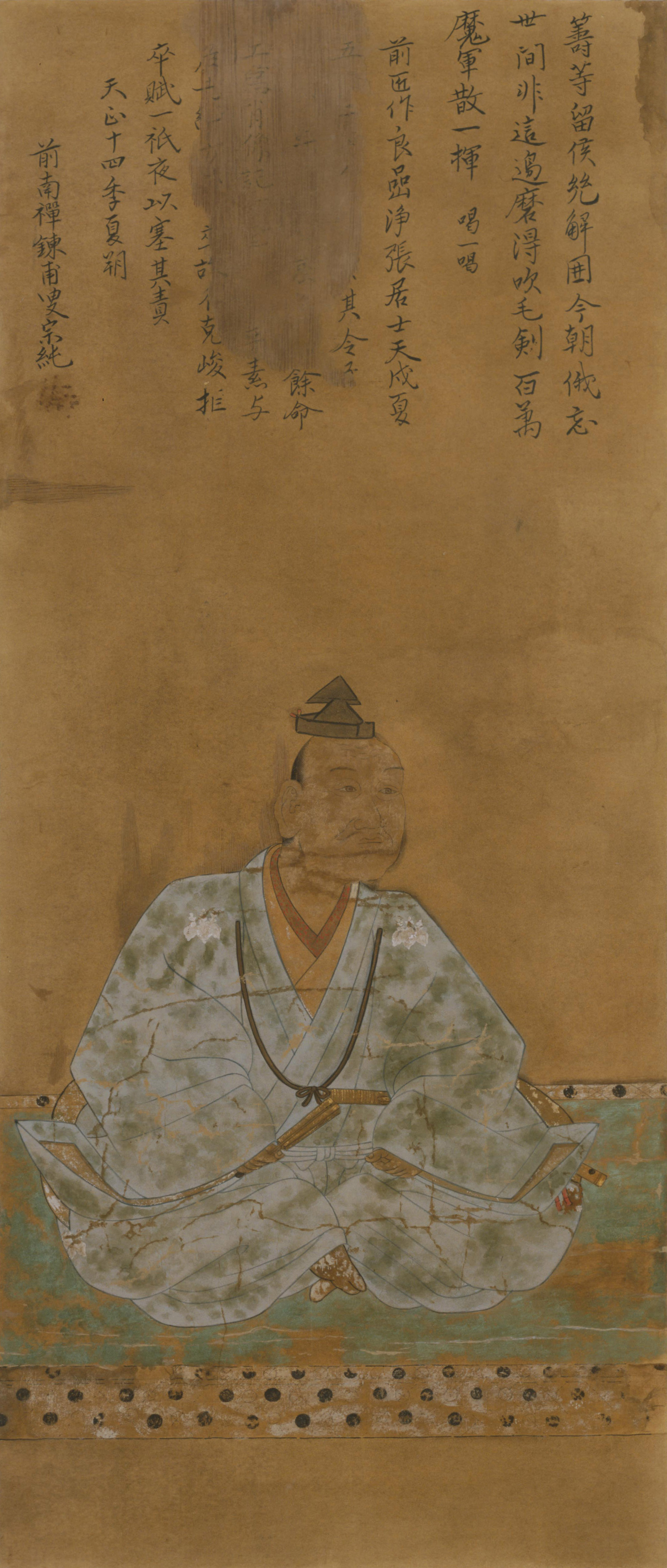

Head of Hachisuka clan
- In office 1553–1586
- Preceded by: Hachisuka Masatoshi
- Succeeded by: Hachisuka Iemasa

Personal details
- Born: 1526 Ama, Aichi Prefecture
- Died: July 8, 1586 (aged 59–60)
- Relatives: Hachisuka Masatoshi (father); Hachisuka Iemasa (son); Kuroda Nagamasa (son in law)
- Nickname: "Koroku"

Military service
- Allegiance: Saitō clan Oda clan Toyotomi clan
- Battles/wars: Battle of Nagaragawa; Siege of Inabayama; Battle of Anegawa; Siege of Miki; Siege of Tottori; Siege of Takamatsu; Invasion of Shikoku

Hachisuka Masakatsu (蜂須賀 正勝; 1526 – July 8, 1586), also known Hachisuka Koroku (蜂須賀小六), was a daimyō, retainer and adviser of Toyotomi Hideyoshi during the Azuchi–Momoyama period of Japanese history. He was the son of Hachisuka Masatoshi.

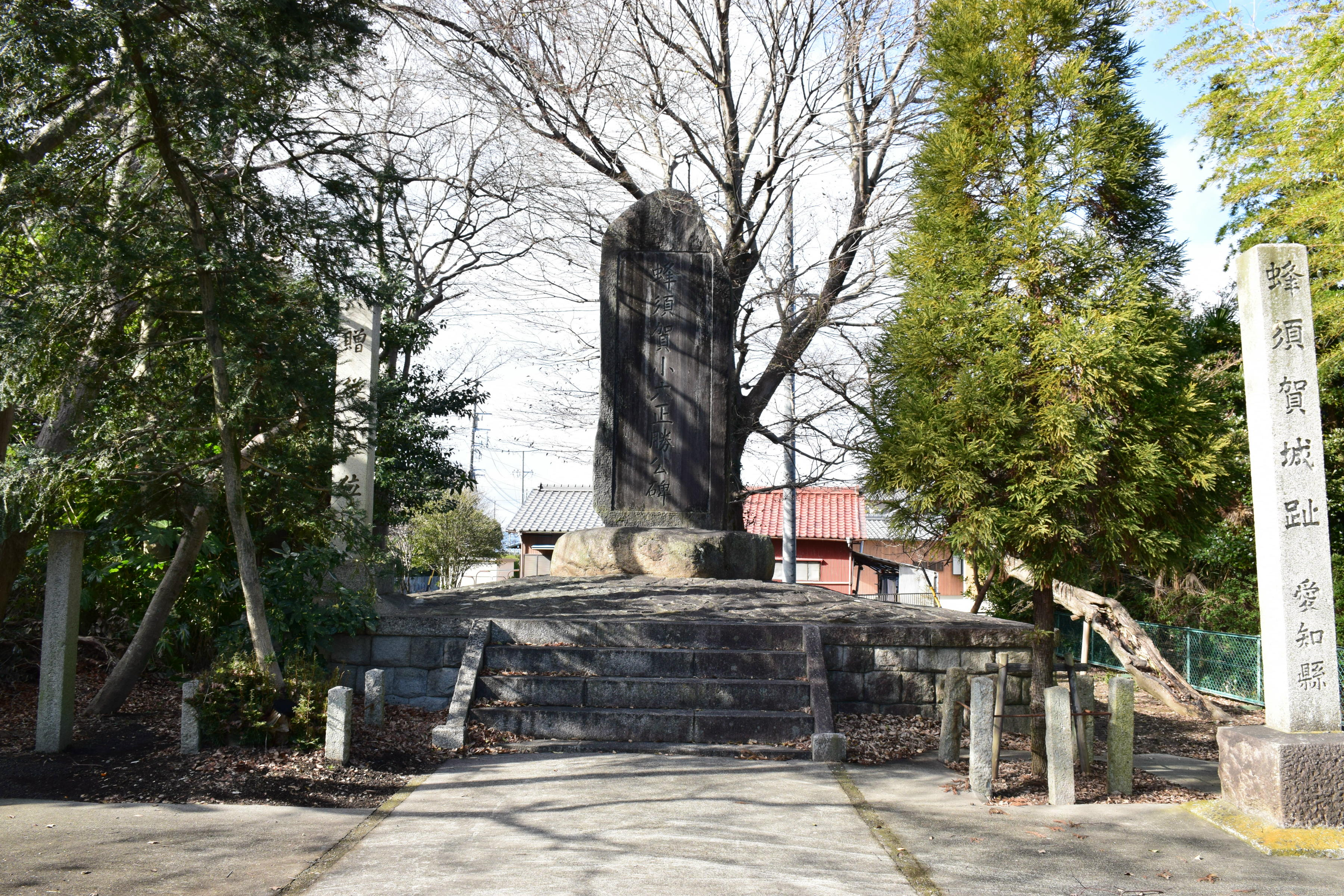
Hachisuka Masakatsu's birthplace monument（Ama, Aichi Prefecture）

The Hachisuka clan were the kokujin of the Kaitō District of Owari Province (in present-day Ama District, Aichi Prefecture). They controlled water transport on the Kiso River. Their knowledge of local terrain made them useful to the Oda and Saitō clans, although they remained independent of control of the powerful clans.

After the death of his father in 1553, Masakatsu left his hometown to serve as an attendant to lord Saitō Dōsan. Dōsan frequently relied upon Masakatsu for conflicts between those in Mino and Owari provinces. Masakatsu’s earlier name of Toshimasa matches an earlier name of Dōsan and is surmised to have been received from Dōsan. In 1556, at the Battle of Nagaragawa between Dōsan and Saitō Yoshitatsu, Masakatsu joined Dōsan’s forces.

After death of Dōsan, Masakatsu served Oda Nobunaga, under command of Toyotomi Hideyoshi, and may have participated in the building of Sunomata Castle (1567) and fought at the Siege of Inabayama (1568), also fought at the Battle of Anegawa (1570) against Azai and Asakura forces, as well as the Chugoku campaigns against the Mōri.

In 1585, after Invasion of Shikoku, Hideyoshi awarded him Awa Province as a fief, but he declined in favor of his son, Iemasa, and serving instead as a close adviser of Hideyoshi.

== Family ==
Hachisuka Masakatsu family crest, known as the Hachisuka swastika

- Father: Hachisuka Masatoshi (d. 1553)
- Mother: daughter of Yasui Shigeyuki
- Wife: Matsu later Daishou'in (d. 1611)
- Concubine: Hakun'in
- Children:
  - Hachisuka Iemasa (1558-1639) by Matsu
  - Narahime (d. 1606) married Kashima Nagamasa by Matsu
  - Itohime (1571–1645) married Kuroda Nagamasa by Hakun'in

== Legacy ==
To mark the 500th anniversary of his birth, Ama City held a number of commemorative events in 2026, including a special exhibition and commemorative lecture.

Preceded by none	Hachisuka family head ????–1585	Succeeded by Hachisuka Iemasa
