= Fuwa (surname) =

Fuwa (written: 不破 or 芙羽) is a Japanese surname. Notable people with the surname include:

- Hiroki Fuwa (不破 弘樹; born 1966), Japanese sprinter
- Fuwa Mitsuharu (不破 光治; died 1580), Japanese samurai
- Tetsuzo Fuwa (不破 哲三; 1930–2025), Japanese communist politician

== Fictional characters ==
- Isamu Fuwa (不破 諫), a character in the tokusatsu series Kamen Rider Zero-One
- Kokone Fuwa (芙羽ここね; also known as Cure Spicy), a main character in the 2022 anime series Delicious Party Pretty Cure
  - Hatsuko Fuwa (芙羽はつこ), Kokone's mother
  - Shousei Fuwa (芙羽しょうせい), Kokone's father
- Yusuki Fuwa (不破 優月), a character in the manga series Assassination Classroom
- Renge Fuwa, a character from Blue Archive
