= Sunomata Castle =

Japanese castle in Ōgaki, Gifu Prefecture

Sunomata Castle 墨俣城
- Ōgaki, Gifu Prefecture, Japan
- Sunomata Castle on the banks of the Sai River

Site information
- Type: Japanese castle
- Condition: reconstructed

Location
- Location within Gifu Prefecture Location within Japan
- Coordinates: 35°22′1.54″N 136°41′15.76″E

Site history
- Built: 1567
- Built by: Toyotomi Hideyoshi

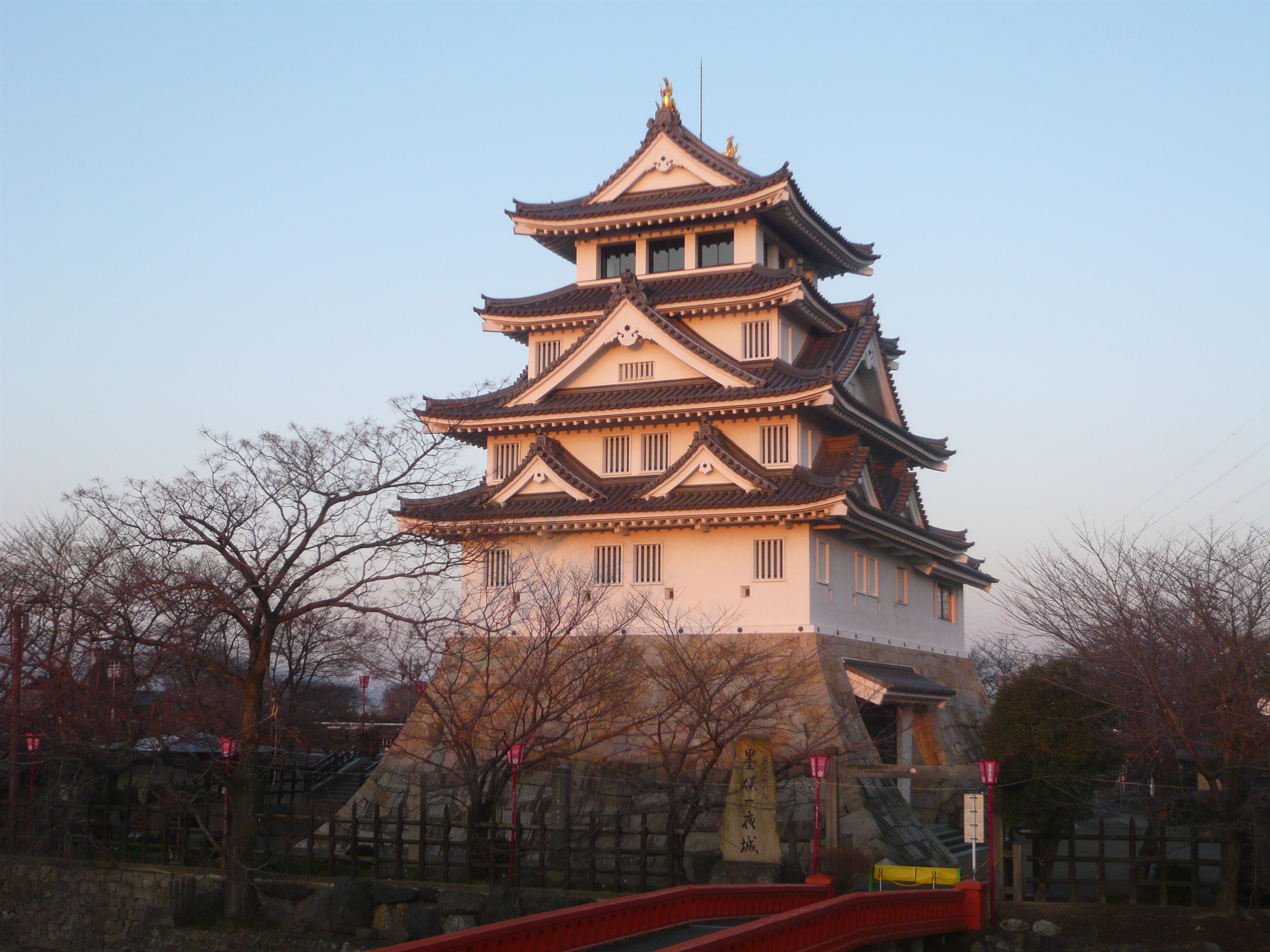
Tenshu

Sunomata Castle (墨俣城, Sunomata-jō) is a Japanese castle in Ōgaki in Gifu Prefecture at the confluence of the Sai and Nagara rivers. It is also called the Sunomata Ichiya Castle (墨俣一夜城), due to the legend that it was built in one night.

The castle was constructed by Toyotomi Hideyoshi, at the time a minor retainer of Oda Nobunaga, while they were pressing the Siege of Inabayama Castle in the mid-16th century. "The work of building at Sunomata was done by a band of adventurers under the direction of a local robber baron named Hachisuka Koroku." Hideyoshi used pre-constructed sections to put up the fortress and it was finished so quickly that it gave the impression that it was done overnight, although the work took several days to complete. Hideyoshi's success with the construction of this castle greatly raised his prestige and standing with Nobunaga, and marked the start of his rise to fame. The "castle" was more of a wooden walled fortress, with simple watchtowers, wooden palisades, and dry moats. In reality, it was more of a border fort than a full sized castle, and was intended to intimidate, surprise and demoralize the enemy.

A faux castle tower was reconstructed in 1991 to serve as a local history museum. The reconstruction is not historically accurate, as it was modeled after the nearby Ōgaki Castle, although it contains a model of what the castle actually looked like in the museum, along with samurai armor and weapons of that time. The castle is also noted as a site to view cherry blossoms during spring.

== See also ==
- Ishigakiyama Ichiya Castle
- Taikōki, biography of lord Toyotomi Hideyoshi
