= Andō Morinari =

- 安藤 守就
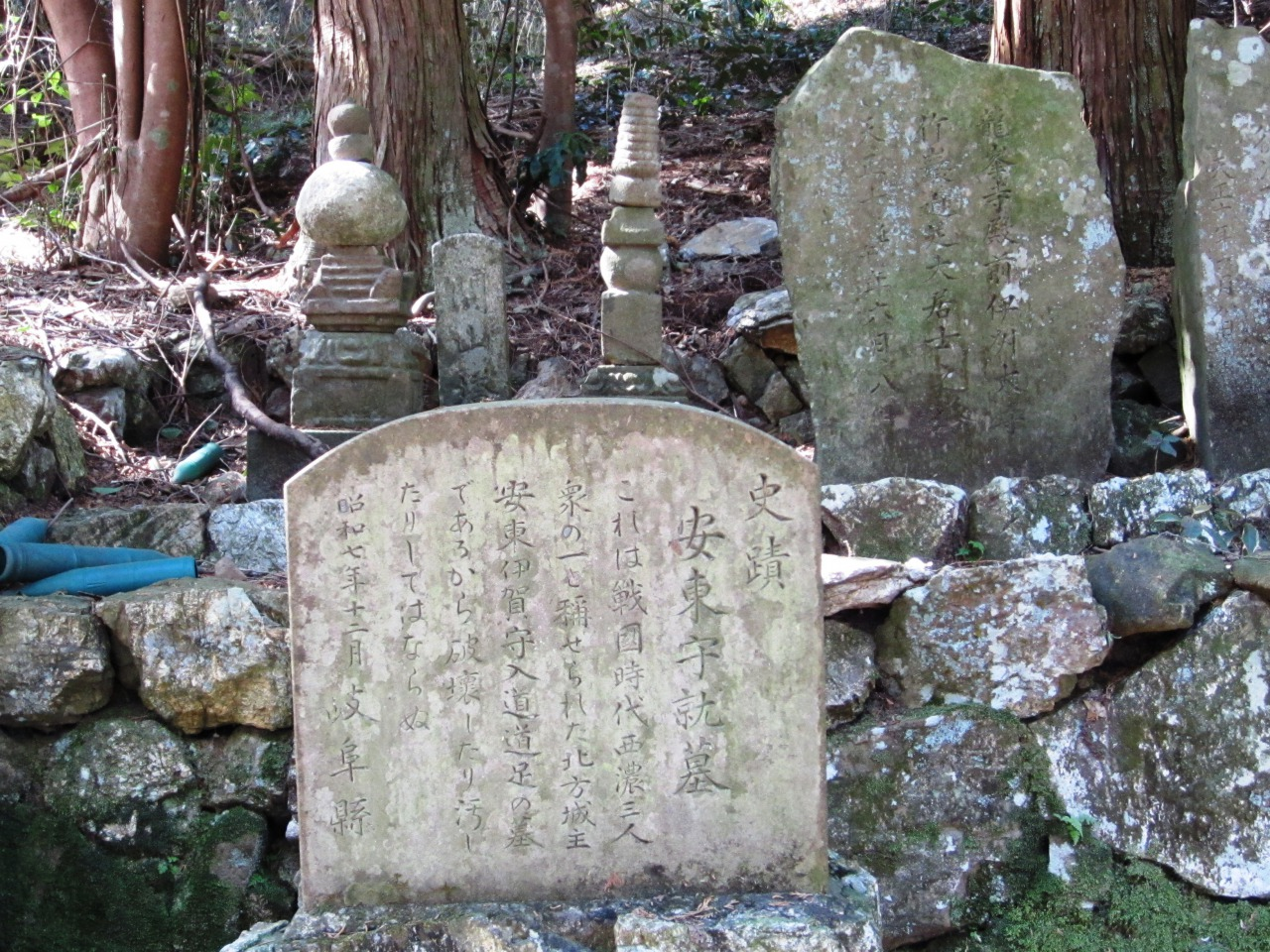
- Andō Morinari's grave
- Born: 1513; Mino Province
- Died: June 27, 1582 (aged 68–69)
- Relatives: Takenaka Hanbei (son in law)
- Military career
- Allegiance: Toki clan Saito clan Oda clan
- Nickname: Andō Michitari (安藤 道足)
- Conflicts: Battle of Nagaragawa; Siege of Inabayama; Battle of Anegawa; Siege of Nagashima; Siege of Ichijōdani Castle; Kaga campaign Siege of Ishiyama Honganji; Siege of Itami

Andō Morinari (安藤 守就; 1513 – June 27, 1582), also known as Andō Michitari (安藤 道足) was a Japanese samurai who lived during the Sengoku period. He served the Saitō clan of Mino Province. Later, he become a retainer of Oda Nobunaga.

He served as a head retainer under Saitō Dōsan after Dōsan overthrew Toki Yorinari (the original ruler of Mino) and became daimyō of Mino Province. Later, he took part in the Battle of Nagaragawa against Saitō Dōsan.

Morinari was considered one of the "Mino Triumvirate" (西美濃三人衆, Nishi Mino Sanninshū), along with Inaba Yoshimichi and Ujiie Naotomo. In 1567, they agreed together to join the forces of Oda Nobunaga.

He fought at the Siege of Inabayama (1567), Battle of Anegawa (1570), Siege of Nagashima (1571,1574), Siege of Ichijodani Castle (1573), battles for the Ishiyama Honganji and Siege of Itami (1579).

In 1580, He was dismissed from Nobunaga's service following the fall of the Honganji. Nobunaga suspected Morinari together with Hayashi Hidesada and Niwa Ujikatsu of having ambitions against Oda clan.
