= Hachisuka Iemasa =

Japanese daimyō

- 蜂須賀 家政
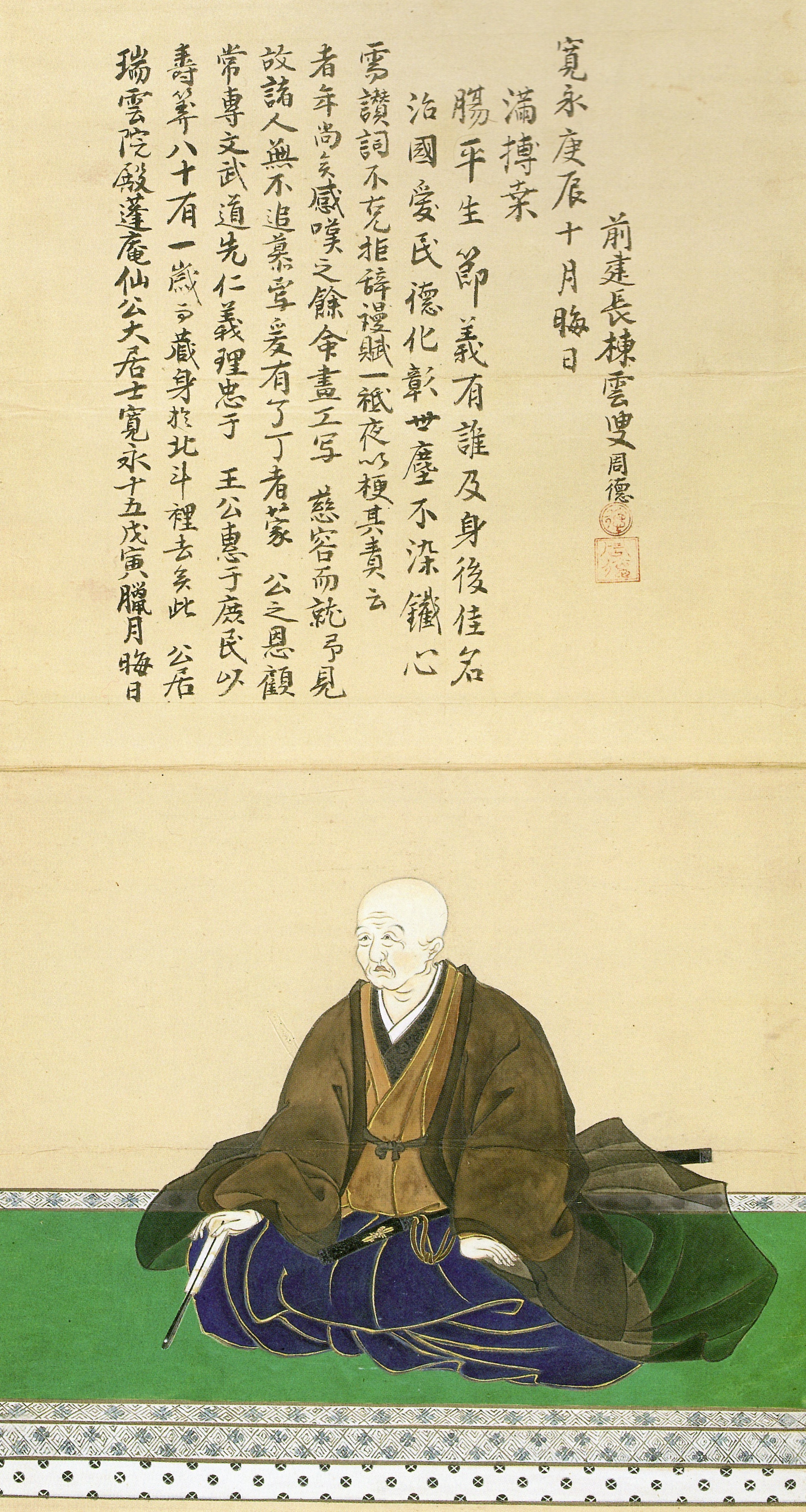

Head of Hachisuka clan
- In office 1586–1639
- Preceded by: Hachisuka Masakatsu
- Succeeded by: Hachisuka Tadateru

Lord of Tokushima
- In office 1600–1614
- Succeeded by: Hachisuka Yoshishige

Personal details
- Born: 1558 Owari Province, Japan
- Died: February 2, 1639 (aged 80–81)
- Children: Hachisuka Yoshishige
- Relatives: Hachisuka Masakatsu (father); Hachisuka Tadateru (grandson); Kuroda Nagamasa (brother in law)

Military service
- Allegiance: Oda clan Toyotomi clan Eastern Army; Tokugawa Shogunate
- Rank: Daimyo
- Battles/wars: Battle of Yamazaki (1582); Invasion of Shikoku (1585); Korean campaign (1592-1598); Battle of Sekigahara (1600)

Hachisuka Iemasa (蜂須賀 家政; 1558 – February 2, 1639) was a Japanese daimyō of the early Edo period. Iemasa, the son of Hachisuka Masakatsu or Koroku, was the founder of the Tokushima Domain. He was one of some daimyo who have bad terms with Ishida Mitsunari.

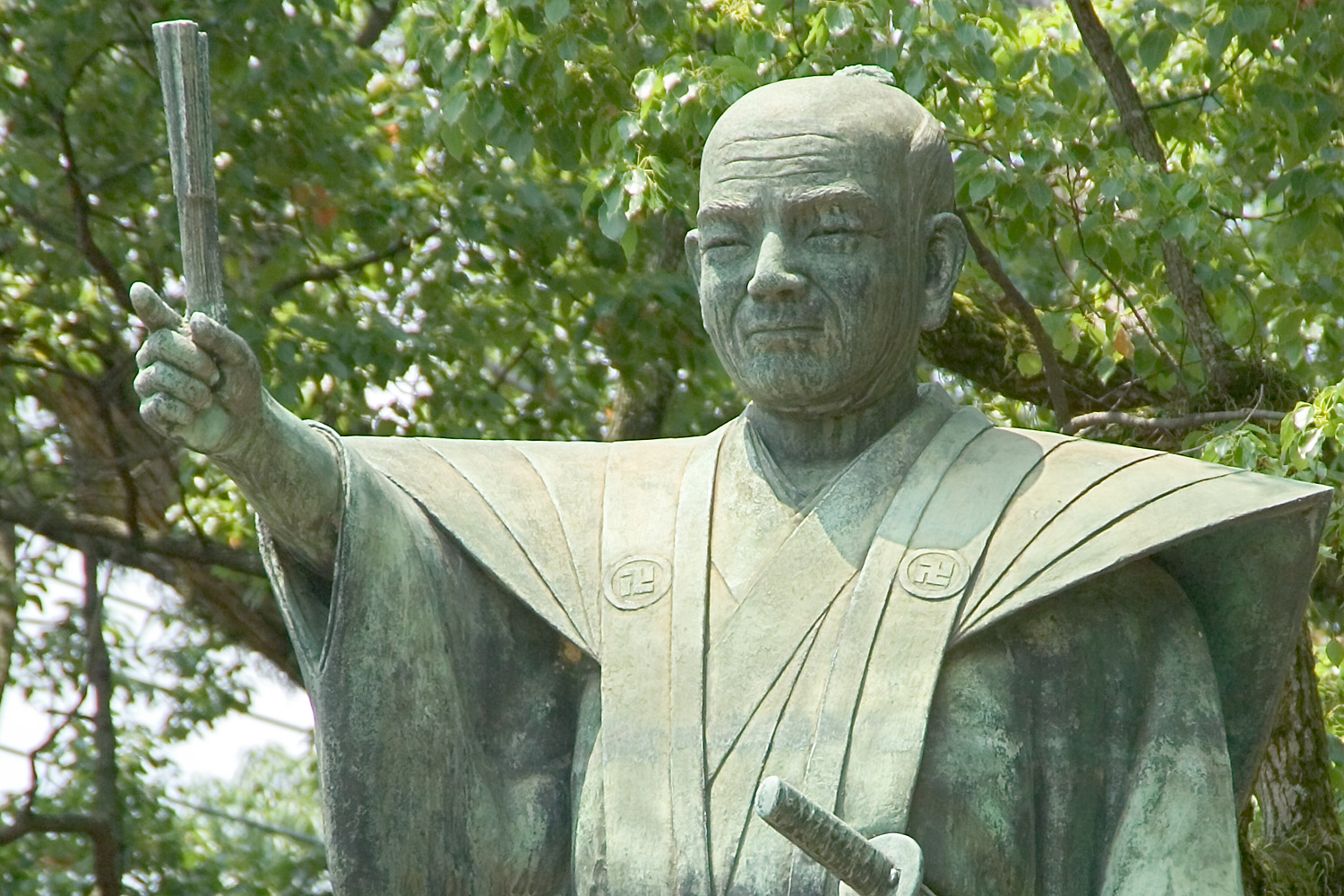
Statue of Hachisuka Iemasa

His father was a retainer of Toyotomi Hideyoshi. But later Iemasa served both Oda Nobunaga and Hideyoshi, taking part in the Battle of Yamazaki in 1582, invasion of Shikoku in 1585, and Hideyoshi's Korean campaign from 1592 to 1598. After Hideyoshi gained control of Shikoku, Awa Province was given to Hachisuka Iemasa along with Awaji Island. He and his family were appointed as lords of the fief with an income of 257,000 koku; the family ruled until the end of the Edo period.

In 1600, Iemasa fought on the side of Tokugawa Ieyasu at the Battle of Sekigahara, and was allowed to retain his fief for his service there.

== Family ==
- Father: Hachisuka Masakatsu
- Mother: Daishō-in (d. 1611)
- Wife: Jiko-in (1563–1606), daughter of Ikoma Ienaga, lord of Koori castle, and descendant of Fujiwara no Yoshifusa
- Concubine: commoner
- Children:
  - Hachisuka Yoshishige by Jiko-in
  - Manhime (1593–1612) married Ikeda Yoshiyuki by commoner
  - Akihime married Ii Naotaka by commoner
  - Tatsuhime (d. 1629) married Matsudaira Tadamitsu by commoner
