= Sai River (Gifu) =

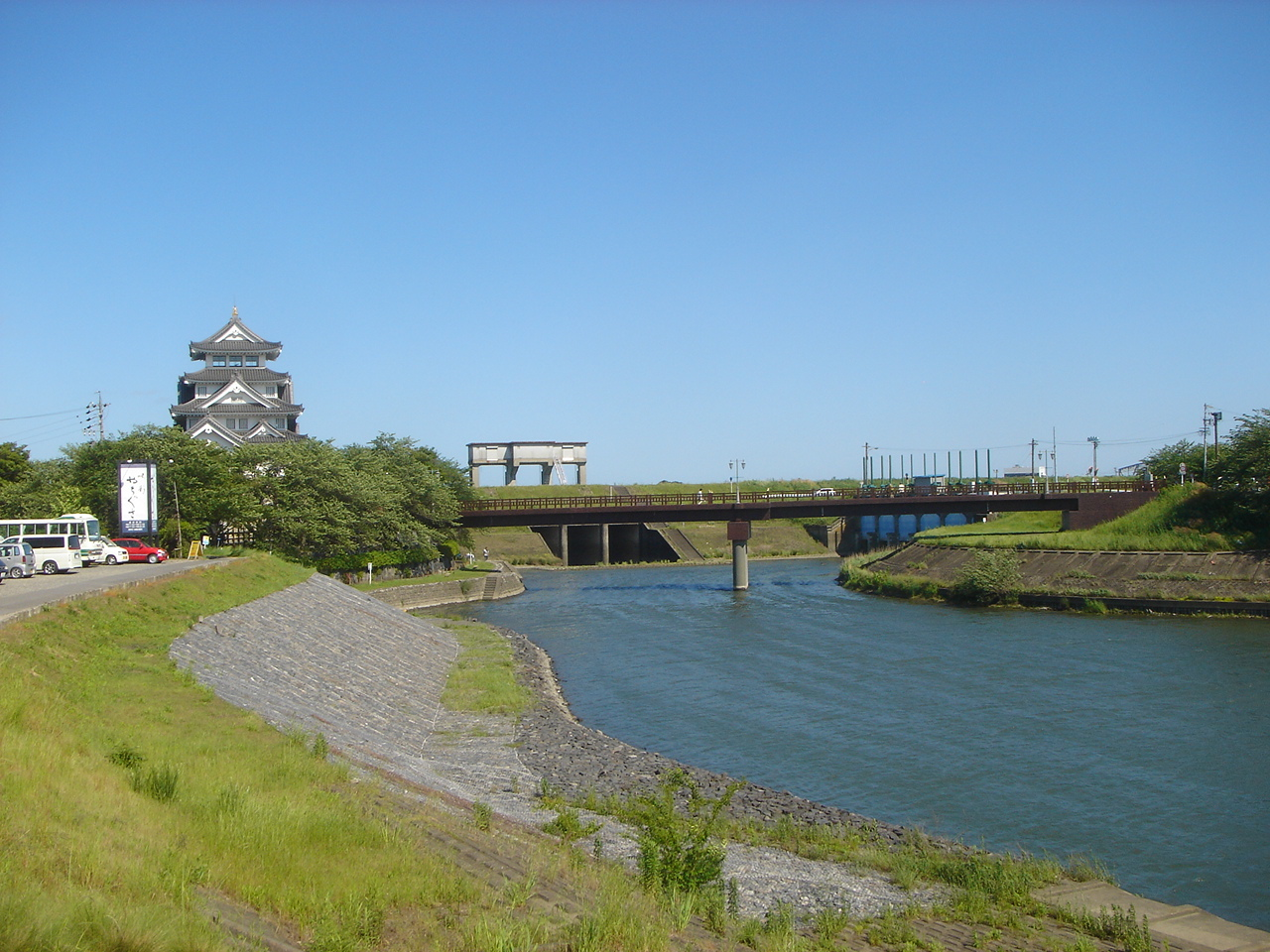
- The Sai River flowing alongside Sunomata Castle

- Native name: 犀川 (Japanese)

Location
- Country: Japan

Physical characteristics
- Source
  - location: Motosu, Gifu
- Mouth
  - location: Nagara River
- Length: 12 km (7.5 mi)
- Basin size: 17.18 km^{2} (6.63 sq mi)

Basin features
- River system: Kiso River

The Sai River (犀川, Sai-gawa), literally River of Rhino, is a river in Japan which flows through Gifu Prefecture, and empties into the Nagara River.

== Geography ==
The river flows from the city of Motosu, where it takes water from the Neo River and flows south. After running through Hozumi and Ōgaki, it runs parallel to the Nagara River, which it joins in Anpachi.

The cherry blossoms on the banks of the river near Sunomata Castle are well known and are included on a list of the top 33 cherry blossom sites in Gifu Prefecture.

== History ==
- 1530: A large flood shifted the main branch of the original Neo River to its current route. This same flood created the Sai River.
- 1641: A fight broke out between the owners of the Mushiroda Canal (席田用水 Mushiroda Yōsui) and the Makuwa Canal (真桑用水 Makuwa Yōsui) over water usage from the Sai River. The dispute was settled with the Mushiroda Canal taking 60% of the flow and the Makuwa Canal taking the remaining 40%.
- 1929: The Sai River Incident occurred when residents demonstrated against the prefectural governor for plans to alter the flow of the river.
