= Inaba Yoshimichi =

Samurai warrior

- 稲葉 良通
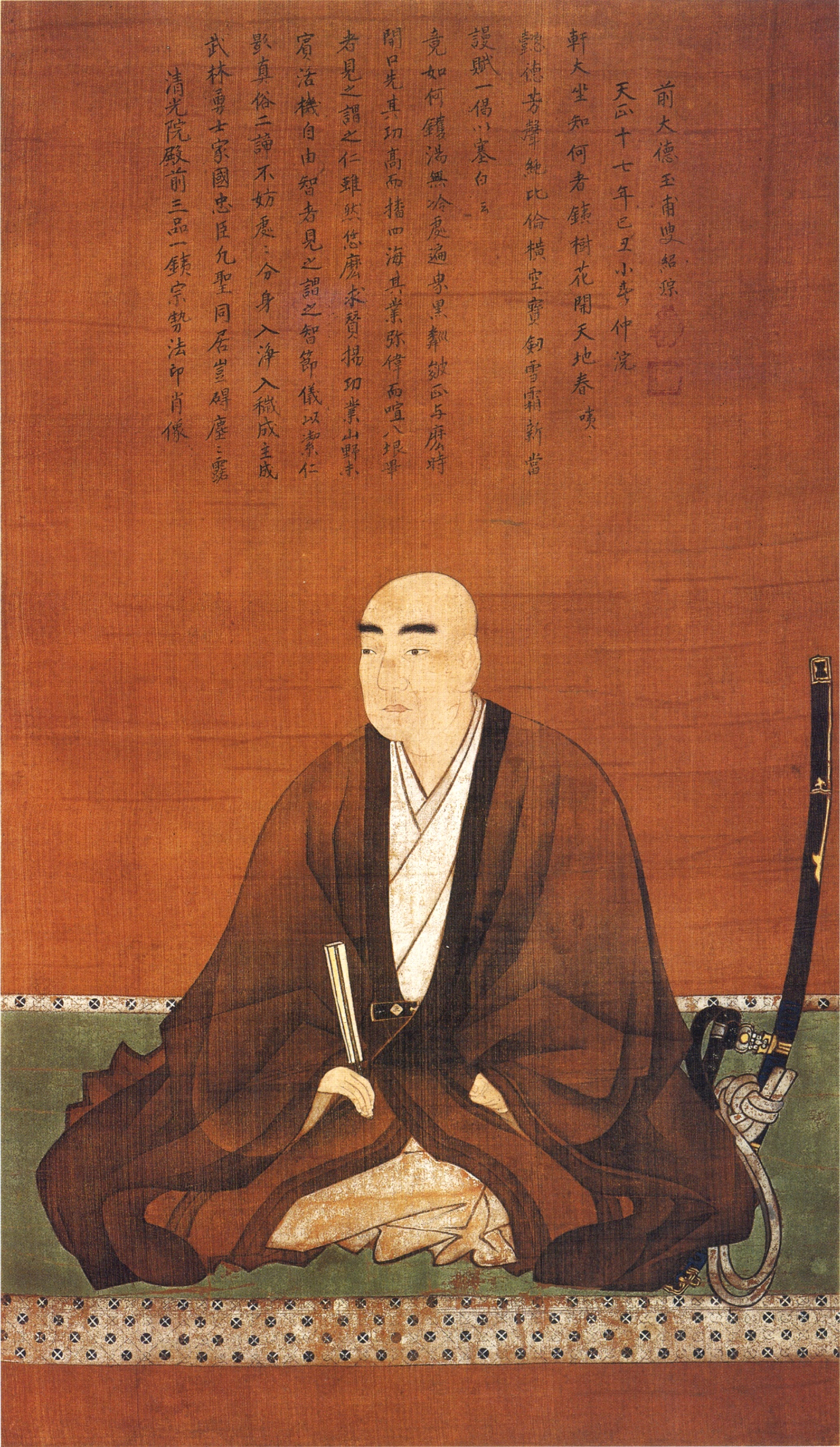
- Born: 1515; Honjō Castle; Mino province (now Gifu Prefecture), Japan
- Died: January 5, 1589 (aged 73–74); Shimizu Castle; Mino province (now Gifu Prefecture), Japan
- Other name: Hikoshiro (彦四郎) later Hikoroku (彦六郎)
- Spouse(s): Daughter of Sanjōnishi Saneki (wife); Daughter of Kanou Family (concubine)
- Children: Inaba Masanari
- Relatives: Daughter of Kunieda Shōsuke (mother); Inaba Michinori (father); Lady Kasuga (daughter in law)
- Military career
- Allegiance: Saito clan Oda clan Toyotomi clan
- Era: Sengoku and Azuchi-Momoyama
- Titles: Bushō; Governor of Iyo; High Priest of the Third Rank
- Nickname: Inaba Ittetsu (稲葉 一鉄)
- Conflicts: Battle of Nagara-gawa; Siege of Inabayama; Battle of Anegawa; Siege of Ishiyama-Honganji; Siege of Ichijodani Castle; Siege of Nagashima; Battle of Nagashino; Kaga campaign Battle of Shizugatake; Battle of Komaki-Nagakute

Inaba Yoshimichi (稲葉 良通; 1515 – January 5, 1589), also known as Inaba Ittetsu (稲葉 一鉄), was a Japanese samurai warrior during the Sengoku period. He served the Saitō clan of Mino province. Later, he became a retainer of Oda Nobunaga.

His childhood name was Hikoshiro (彦四郎) later Hikoroku (彦六郎). Yoshimichi was considered one of the "Mino Triumvirate" (西美濃三人衆, Nishi Mino Sanninshū), along with Andō Michitari and Ujiie Bokuzen. In 1567, they agreed together to join the forces of Oda Nobunaga.

He took part in the Siege of Inabayama Castle (1567) and participated in the Battle of Anegawa (1570), leading the reserve troops of Oda Nobunaga's forces. Later, he fought in the Siege of Ishiyama-Honganji, Siege of Ichijodani Castle, Siege of Nagashima, Battle of Nagashino, and Kaga campaign under Shibata Katsuie.

His son, Inaba Masanari, was the husband of Saitō Fuku. Ittetsu himself lived and went into the service of Hideyoshi Toyotomi, serving at the Battle of Shizugatake and the Battle of Komaki-Nagakute before dying in 1589.

== Family ==
- Father: Inaba Michinori
- Mother: Isshiki Yoshito's daughter
- Wife: Sanjonishi Saneki's daughter
- Concubine: daughter of Kanou Family
- Children:
  - daughter married Horiichi Hannosuke
  - daughter married Kunie Shigemoto
  - Inaba Shigemichi (died 1598) by daughter of Kanou Family
  - Inaba Sadamichi (1546–1603) by Sanjonishi Saneki's daughter
  - Inaba Naomasa
  - Inaba Masamichi (1566–1640)
  - Yasuhime married Saito Toshimitsu
  - daughter married Marumo Kanetoshi
  - daughter married Yamamura Yoshikatsu
