= Saitō Dōsan =

Sengoku period Japanese samurai

- 斎藤 道三
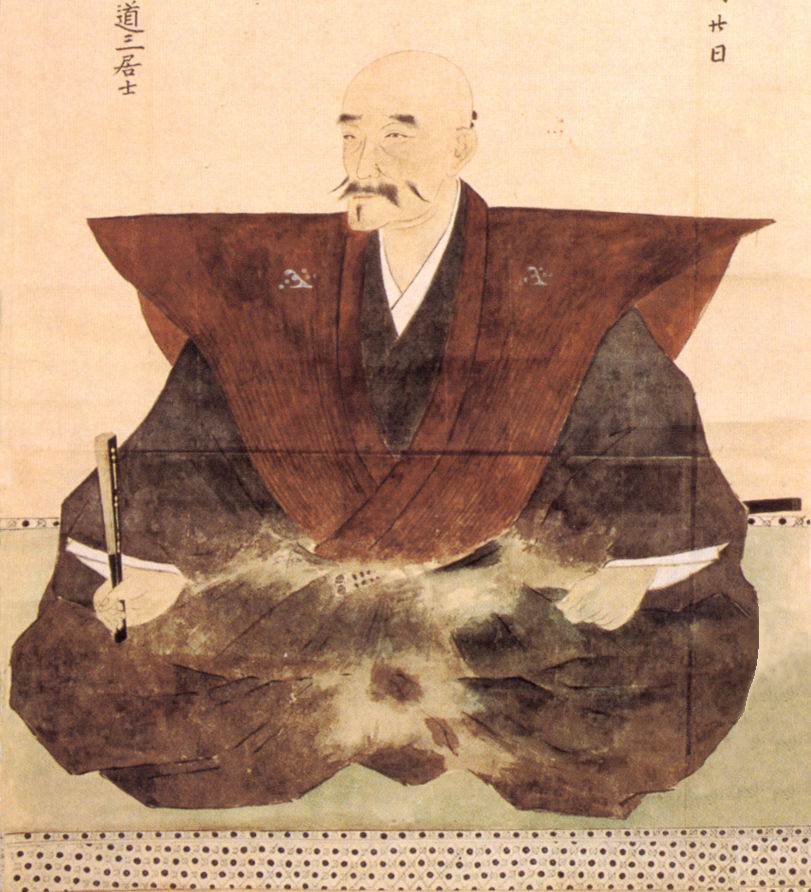

Head of Saitō clan
- In office 1542–1556
- Succeeded by: Saitō Yoshitatsu

Lord of Mino
- In office 1542–1556
- Preceded by: Toki Yorinari
- Succeeded by: Saito Yoshitatsu

Personal details
- Born: 1494
- Died: May 28, 1556 (aged 61–62) Battle of Nagaragawa, Mino Province
- Relations: Oda Nobunaga (son in law); Akechi Mitsutsuna (brother in law)
- Children: Saitō Yoshitatsu; Nōhime
- Nickname: "Viper of Mino"

Military service
- Allegiance: Toki clan Saitō clan
- Rank: Daimyo
- Unit: Saitō clan
- Commands: Inabayama Castle
- Battles/wars: Mino Campaign (1542); Battle of Kanōguchi (1547); Battle of Nagara-gawa (1556) †

Saitō Dōsan (斎藤 道三; 1494 – May 28, 1556), also known as Saitō Toshimasa (斎藤 利政), was a Japanese samurai lord and daimyo during the Sengoku period. He was also known as the "Viper of Mino" (美濃の蝮, Mino no Mamushi) for his ruthless tactics. He was appointed Governor of Yamashiro by the Imperial Court. After entering monkhood in his later years, he was also called Saitō Yamashiro-nyudō-no-kami (斎藤山城入道守).

He has historical reputation as one of Japan's Three Great Villains (日本三大梟雄), a nickname which he shared with Matsunaga Hisahide and Ukita Naoie, due to their ambitious and treasonous personality, along with the habit of resorting to underhanded tactics and assassinations to eliminate their opposition. (Note: Not to be confused with Ashikaga Takauji, Dōkyō and Taira no Kiyomori; who also known with similar sobriquet as Japan's Three Great Villains by Confucian-minded history scholars due to their lack of loyalty to the throne.)

== Biography ==
Saitō Dōsan has long been regarded as a symbolic figure of "Gekokujō" (the rise of those of lower status to positions of power), rising from a humble oil merchant to the ruler of Mino Province. However, research from the letter by Rokkaku Yoshikata (excavated in 1968) suggests that it was actually Dōsan's father who was the oil merchant. This implies that Dōsan's "Gekokujō" was a two-generation achievement involving both father and son.

According to Minono Kuni Shokyūki (美濃国諸旧記), his father named Matsunami Motomune (松波基宗), was the "Hokumen no bushi" (北面武士, imperial guard of the north), but became as Ronin after Ōnin war, this forced Dōsan became a monk for a period. After secularization, he named “Matsunami Shōgorō (松波庄五郎)” and became an oil merchant, his masterful oil pouring technique appreciated by Toki clan’s retainer Yano Gozaemon (矢野五左衛門), and advised to master the martial arts, he accepted and mastered the spearplay and martial arts to join Nagai clan that under Toki clan. He also mastered teppō after the firearm introduced to Japan.

He became a daimyo through Gekokujō of Toki Yorinari at Mino Province in 1542. Yorinari was forced out of Mino by Saitō Dōsan.

The Saito fortress was located at Inabayama castle. He married Omi no kata, a sister of Akechi Mitsutsuna (Akechi Mitsuhide's father).

He defeated Oda Nobuhide at the Battle of Kanōguchi in 1547.

In 1549 Oda Nobuhide was defeated by Dōsan. Nobuhide made peace with Dōsan by arranging a political marriage between his son and heir, Oda Nobunaga, and Dōsan's daughter, Nōhime. Dōsan, therefore, became the father-in-law of Oda Nobunaga. Dōsan supported the marriage which allowed Nobuhide to focus on facing Imagawa Yoshimoto.

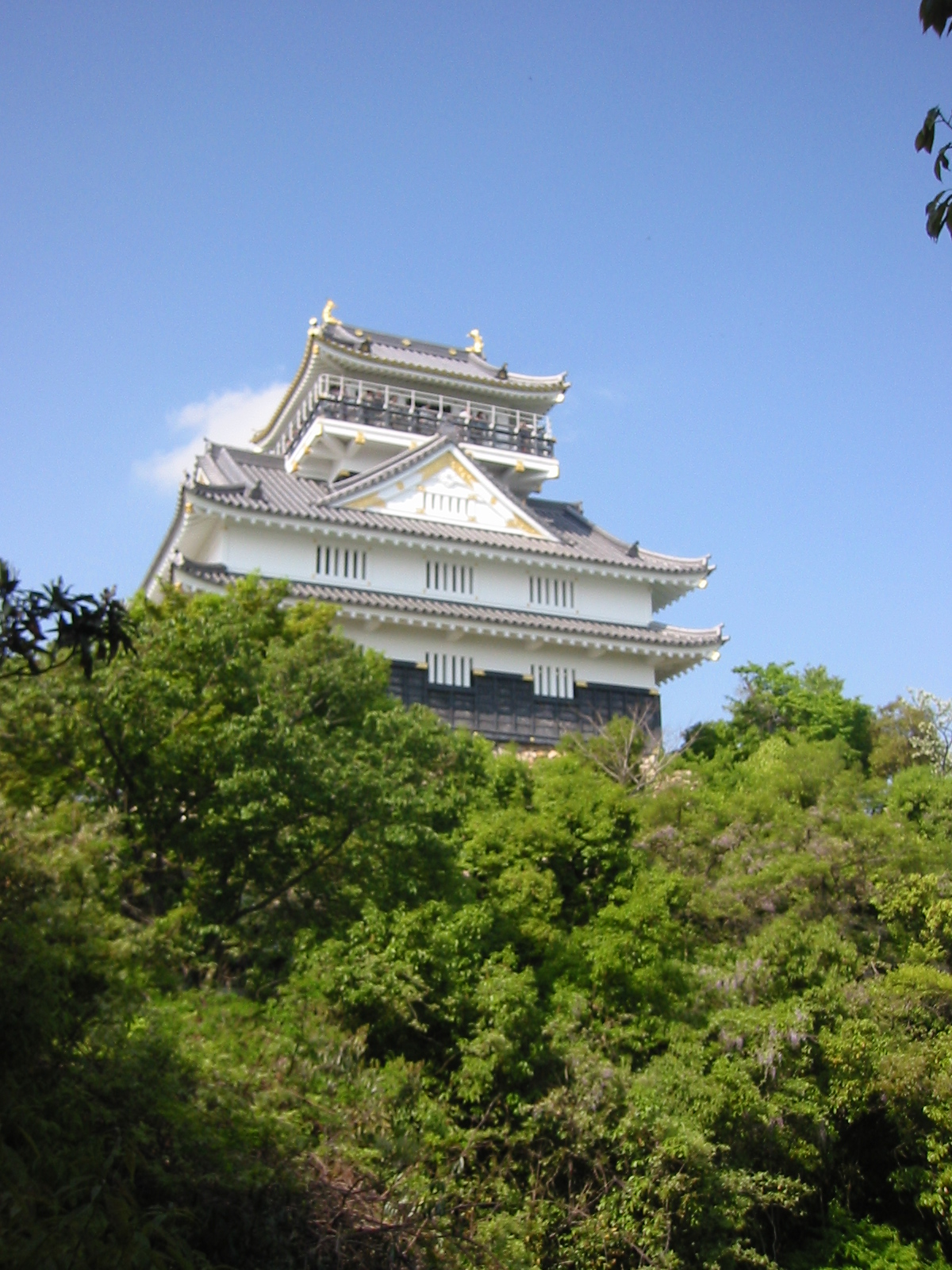
Inabayama Castle (later renamed Gifu Castle by Nobunaga), used as headquarters by Dōsan

Several years later, rumors had started to circulate that Dōsan's firstborn son, Saitō Yoshitatsu, was not his natural son and Dōsan started to consider another son, Saitō Kiheiji, or even his son-in-law Oda Nobunaga, as his heirs. This caused Yoshitatsu to rebel and kill his two younger brothers. In 1556, the forces of Dōsan and Yoshitatsu clashed in the Battle of Nagara-gawa which resulted in the death of Dōsan.

Dōsan's head was taken by a man called Komaki Genta, a retainer of Yoshitatsu's son Saitō Tatsuoki. His remains were originally interred in Sōfuku-ji, but they were later moved to Jōzai-ji because the Nagara River kept overflowing and covering his burial mound. Both temples are located in the city of Gifu which celebrates Dōsan with an annual festival.

== Pseudonyms ==
Saitō Dōsan is known for having a large number of pseudonyms and for frequently changing his name. Some believe that this is because there were two Saitōs Dōsan, father and son, and the son adopted his father's name after his death. Other names of Saitō Dōsan are Minemaru (峰丸), Hōrenbō (法蓮坊), Matsunami Shōgorō (松波庄五郎), Nishimura Kankurō Masatoshi (西村勘九郎正利), Shinkurō (新九郎), Nagai Norihide (長井規秀), and Saitō Sakondayu Toshimasa (斎藤左近大夫利政). The name Saitō was adopted from the former shugodai of Mino who had been overcome by the Nagai clan in the 1520s.

== Notable retainers ==
- Hachiya Yoritaka
- Mori Yoshinari
- Fuwa Mitsuharu
- Inaba Ittetsu
- Ando Morinari
- Ujiie Naotomo
- Hachisuka Masakatsu
- Sakai Masahisa
- Takenaka Shigeharu
- Kanamori Nagachika
- Katō Mitsuyasu
- Sengoku Hidehisa

== Family ==
- Father: Matsunami Motomune (in one traditional story; another version says that he was child of Shinzaemonzo, a monk of Myoukaku-ji Temple)
- Wife: Omi no Kata, daughter of Akechi Mitsutsugu
- Concubine: Miyoshi no Kata
- Children:
  - Saitō Yoshitatsu born to Miyoshi no Kata
  - Saitō Magoshirō
  - Saitō Kiheiji
  - Saitō Toshitaka
  - Saitō Nagatatsu (Toshiharu)
  - Nōhime (Kicho)

== In popular culture ==
- In the Action RPG Nioh 2 he's reimagined as a retired Yokai hunter that fell in love with a female Yokai who bore him two children; Saito Yoshitatsu and the main protagonist "Hide". He's killed by Yoshitatsu's forces at the end of the first act.

== See also ==
- Saitō clan
- Kunitori Monogatari
