= Hirate Hirohide =

Japanese samurai

Hirate Hirohide (平手汎秀) (1553–1572) was a Japanese samurai of the Sengoku period, and an officer under the Oda clan.

During the battle of Mikatagahara, Hirohide was sent by Oda Nobunaga under Sakuma Nobumori to provide reinforcement to Tokugawa Ieyasu. When he was attacked by Takeda Shingen's vanguard, he was killed during the battle.
