= Ujiie Naomoto =

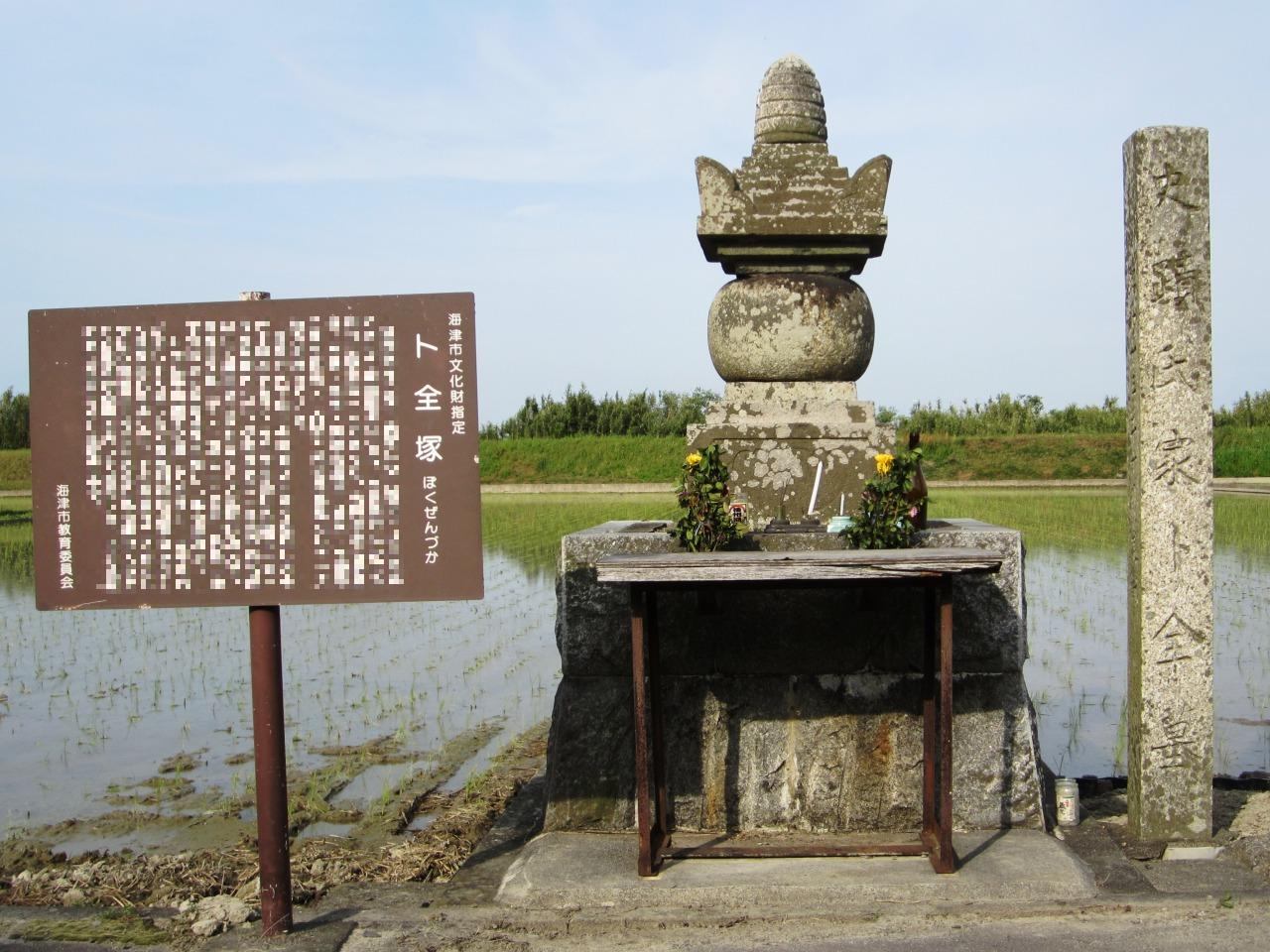
- Bokuzen-Zuka, the grave of Ujiie Bokuzen in Kaizu, Gifu
- Native name: 氏家 直元
- Nickname(s): Ujiie Bokuzen (氏家卜全)
- Born: 1512; Mino province
- Died: June 4, 1571; Siege of Nagashima
- Allegiance: Saito clan Oda clan
- Battles / wars: Battle of Nagara-gawa; Siege of Inabayama; Omi Campaign; Battle of Anegawa; Sieges of Nagashima

Ujiie Naomoto (氏家 直元, 1512? – June 4, 1571), also known as Ujiie Bokuzen (氏家卜全), was a Japanese samurai warrior. served the Saitō clan of Mino province. Later, he become a retainer of Oda Nobunaga.

Naomoto was considered one of the "Mino Triumvirate" (西美濃三人衆, Nishi Mino Sanninshū), along with Inaba Yoshimichi and Andō Morinari. In 1567, they agreed together to join the forces of Oda Nobunaga.

He took part in the Siege of Inabayama in 1567 and the Battle of Anegawa in 1570.

On 12 May 1571, he died fighting against the Ikkō-ikki at the First Siege of Nagashima while under the command of Shibata Katsuie.

== Family and relatives ==
- Ujiie Yukikuni (father)
  - Ujiie Naomasa (son)
  - Ujiie Yukihiro (son)
  - Ujiie Yukitsugu (son)

Others in Ujiie clan

- Ujiie Mitsuuji
- Ujiie Sadanao
