= Sieges of Nagashima =

Series of sieges between Oda and Ikkō-Ikki forces

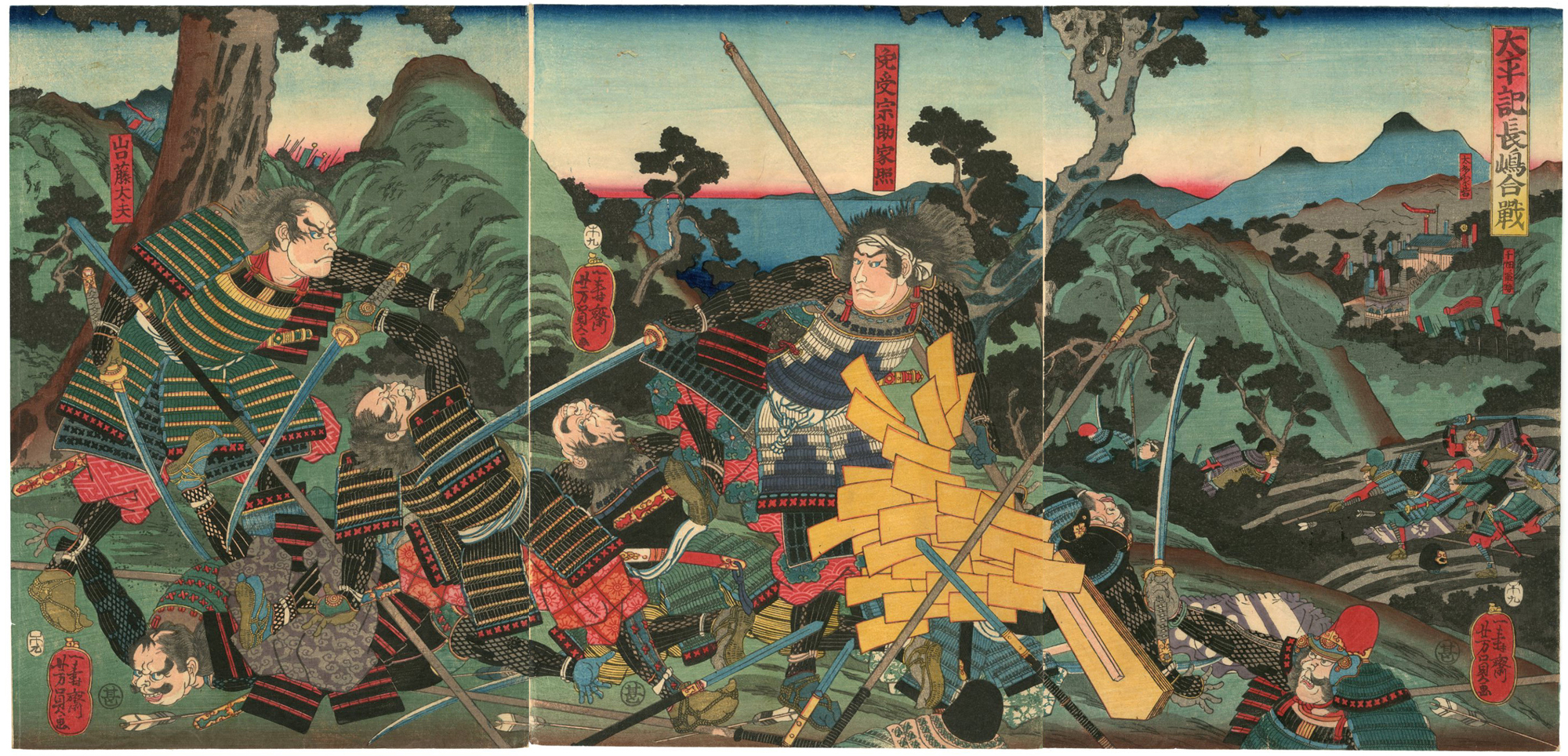
An ukiyo-e of the Battle of Nagashima.

The Sieges of Nagashima (長島一向一揆, Nagashima Ikkō-ikki), taking place in 1571, 1573, and 1574, were part of Oda Nobunaga's campaigns against the Ikkō-ikki, arguably among his greatest enemies. Nagashima, in Owari Province along Japan's Pacific coast, was the location of a string of river island fortresses and defensive works controlled by the Ikkō-ikki, which surrounded their Ganshō-ji monastery. This string of defenses included Nagashima Castle, which they had captured previously. Oda Nobunaga attacked three times over the course of four years, before finally destroying the entire Nagashima complex. These sieges were executed concurrently with Nobunaga's eleven-year siege against the Ikki's primary fortress of Ishiyama Hongan-ji.

== First siege of Nagashima (1571) ==
First siege of Nagashima
- Part of the Sengoku period
| Date | May 1571 |
| Location | Nagashima fortress, Owari Province 35°05′19″N 136°41′53″E |
| Result | Ikkō-ikki victory. |

Belligerents
| Ikkō-ikki monks | forces of Oda Nobunaga |

Commanders and leaders
| Shimozuma Raitan | Shibata Katsuie; Sakuma Nobumori; Ujiie Naotomo †; Andō Morinari; Takigawa Kazumasu |

Strength
| At least 20,000 | At least 20,000 |
- Location within Mie Prefecture Sieges of Nagashima (Aichi Prefecture) Sieges of Nagashima (Japan)

Nobunaga's troops made camp at Tsushima, to the northeast of Nagashima, on 16 May 1571. Separated from the Ikki's fortresses by a shallow but broad river, Nobunaga's commanders, Sakuma Nobumori and Shibata Katsuie, planned their attack upon the nearby wajū, small island communities from which attacks on Ganshōji could be launched. These islands were defended from flooding by a complex series of levees.

Nobunaga's forces attacked across the river, but their horses became stuck in the soft mud of the river bottom. The samurai that managed to drag themselves to shore while being fired on were further slowed by ropes stretched across stakes, which tripped up their horses further. Many were then drowned when the defenders opened a dike and flooded the area. Katsuie was injured, Ujiie Naotomo was killed, and many samurai were lost; this first attempt was a definite failure for Nobunaga. His men did manage to set a few villages aflame, however, as they withdrew.

== Second siege of Nagashima (1573) ==
Second siege of Nagashima
- Part of the Sengoku period
| Date | July 1573 |
| Location | Nagashima fortress, Owari Province 35°05′19″N 136°41′53″E |
| Result | Ikkō-ikki victory. |

Belligerents
| Ikkō-ikki monks Iga ikki and Kōka ikki shinobi archers | forces of Oda Nobunaga |

Commanders and leaders
| Shimozuma Raitan | Oda Nobunaga; Sakuma Nobumori; Hashiba Hideyoshi; Takigawa Kazumasu |

Strength
| At least 20,000 | 30,000 |

Nobunaga returned to the matter of Nagashima in July 1573 with a sizable force, largely recruited from Ise Province and containing a good number of arquebusiers. His fervor had been renewed by a successful campaign against the warrior monks of Mount Hiei. His commanders Sakuma Nobumori and Hashiba Hideyoshi (later to be known as Toyotomi Hideyoshi) led a diversionary force attacking from the west, while Nobunaga hoped for his own force to charge forward behind the gunners.

Unfortunately, despite the fame Nobunaga would later receive for his expert firearms tactics, this battle would turn out to be one of his more famous failures in that field. A rainstorm hit just as he was about to open the battle. The rain rendered 90% of the arquebuses useless and left his men in a terribly weak defensive position. The Ikkō-ikki troops immediately counter-attacked. They too are now known for their expertise with firearms, and their arquebuses were covered during the storm. The Ikki began firing as soon as the rain let up, and even came quite close to killing Nobunaga. Nobunaga fell back, attempting to bring his own gunners to bear once more but was forced to retreat.

Another diversionary force, led by Takigawa Kazumasu, captured Yata castle, at the southern tip of the Nagashima complex. They too, however, were forced to withdraw after a successful Ikki counterattack.

== Third siege of Nagashima (1574) ==
Third siege of Nagashima
- Part of the Sengoku period
| Date | 1574 |
| Location | Nagashima fortress, Owari Province 35°05′19″N 136°41′53″E |
| Result | Oda victory; complete destruction of Nagashima complex |

Belligerents
| Ikkō-ikki monks | forces of Oda Nobunaga |

Commanders and leaders
| Shimozuma Raitan | Oda Nobunaga; Oda Nobuhiro †; Oda Nobutada; Shibata Katsuie; Sakuma Nobumori; Inaba Ittetsu; Takigawa Kazumasu; Kuki Yoshitaka; Andō Morinari; Mori Nagayoshi |

Strength
| At least 20,000 | 30,000 |

Casualties and losses
| Entire garrison killed | Unknown |

In 1574, Oda Nobunaga finally succeeded in destroying Nagashima, one of the primary fortresses of the Ikkō-ikki, who numbered among his most bitter enemies.

A fleet of ships led by Kuki Yoshitaka blockaded and bombarded the area, using cannon and fire arrows against the Ikki's wooden watchtowers. This blockade and naval support allowed Nobunaga to seize the outer forts of Nakae and Yanagashima, which in turn allowed him to control access to the west of the complex for the first time.

Eventually, the defenders were forced back by a three-pronged attack, into the fortified monasteries of Ganshōji and Nagashima. The Ikkō-ikki present numbered around 20,000 and they were now completely cut off from outside sources of food, water, and other supplies. As their situation worsened in July and August 1574, the Ikki's allies saw the prospects of relieving the siege worsen as well.

Nobunaga's men built a wooden wall from one outer fort to another, cutting the Ikkō-ikki off from the outside completely. A large wooden palisade was constructed and then set aflame, resulting in the complete destruction of the entire fortress complex; no one escaped or survived.

== See also ==
- Siege of Ishiyama Hongan-ji
- Siege of Mount Hiei
