= Battle of Nagara-gawa =

Battle between Saitō Dōsan and Saitō Yoshitatsu

Battle of Nagara River
- Part of the Muromachi period
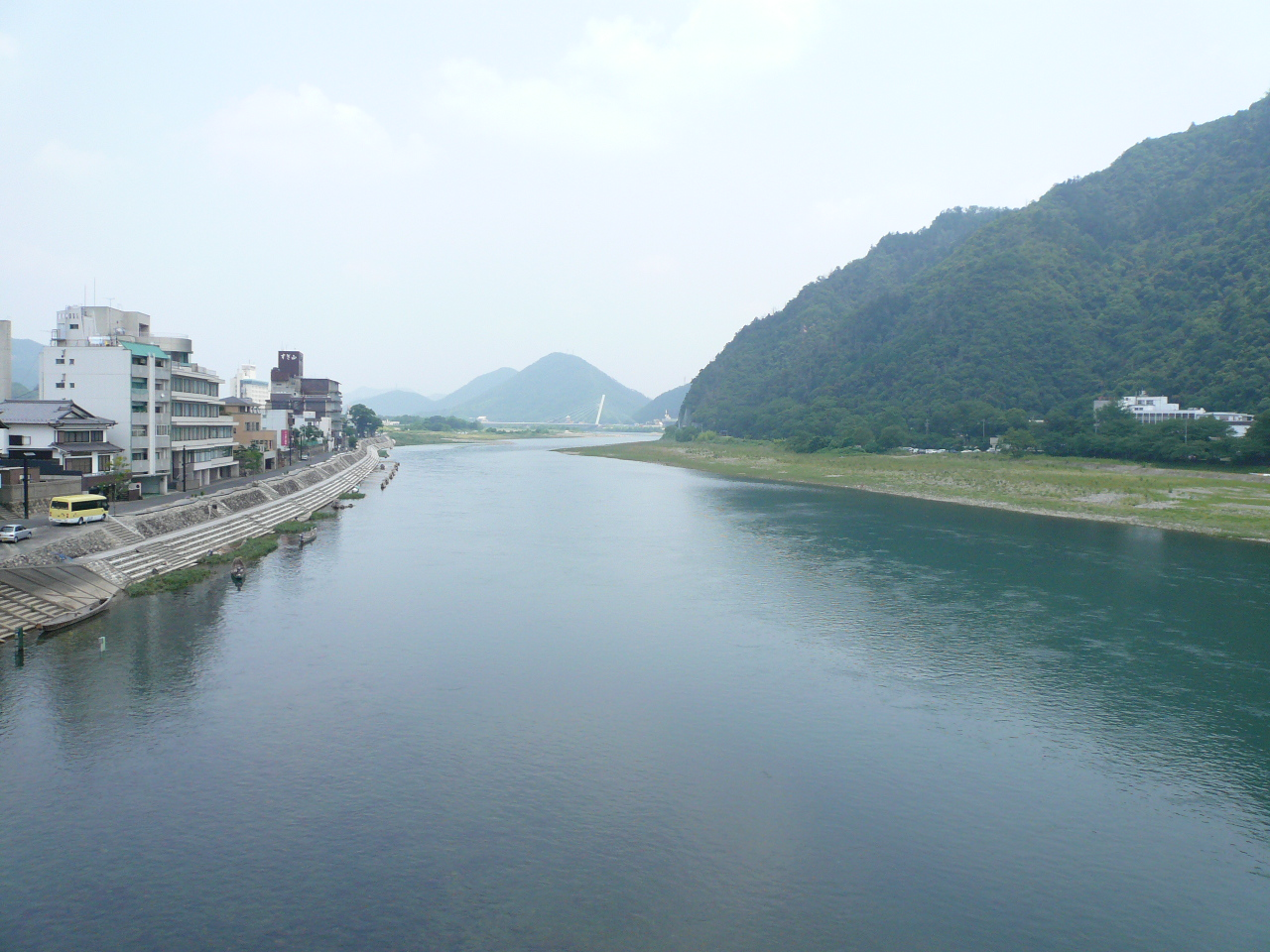
- Nagara River in modern-day Gifu
Date	28 May 1556
Location	Nagara River, Mino Province, Japan 35°26′42″N 136°45′49″E
Result	Saitō Yoshitatsu victory

Belligerents
Forces of Saitō Yoshitatsu	Forces of Saitō Dōsan

Commanders and leaders
Saitō Yoshitatsu; Andō Morinari; Ujiie Naotomo; Inaba Ittetsu	Saitō Dōsan †; Takenaka Shigeharu; Katō Mitsuyasu; Hachisuka Masakatsu

Strength
17,500	2,700
- Location within Gifu Prefecture Battle of Nagara-gawa (Japan)

The Battle of Nagara-gawa (長良川の戦い, Nagara-gawa no tatakai) took place along the banks of the Nagara River in the former Mino Province in April 1556. The site of the battle is in present-day Gifu city, Gifu Prefecture, Japan. It was a battle between Saitō Dōsan and his son, Saitō Yoshitatsu, who had instigated a coup d'etat.

== Background ==
In 1542, Dōsan became the representative of the Toki clan and ruled over Mino Province as such. He had originally planned on passing his power onto his son Yoshitatsu but, in 1555, he started thinking of passing it on to one of his other sons, Kiheiji (喜平次) or maybe to his son-in-law Nobunaga, who he thought was much more gifted than his biological sons. There were also rumors that Yoshitatsu was not Dōsan's biological son.

== Battle ==
Yoshitatsu, who was living in Sagiyama Castle at the time, heard of his father's plans and, in 1556, killed his two brothers in the family residence on Mount Inaba, starting the intra-family skirmish. Yoshitatsu was able to gain the support of a large portion of the family's soldiers, gathering approximately 17,500 men. Dōsan, on the other hand, was only able to amass around 2,700 soldiers.

Yoshitatsu handily won the battle, which ended in Dōsan's death. Dōsan's son-in-law, Oda Nobunaga, had sent troops to support him, but they did not reach the battle in time to offer any help. It is believed that Akechi Mitsuhide participated in this battle against Dōsan.

== See also ==
- List of Japanese battles
- Takenaka Shigeharu
