= Saitō Tatsuoki =

Daimyo and warrior during the Sengoku period

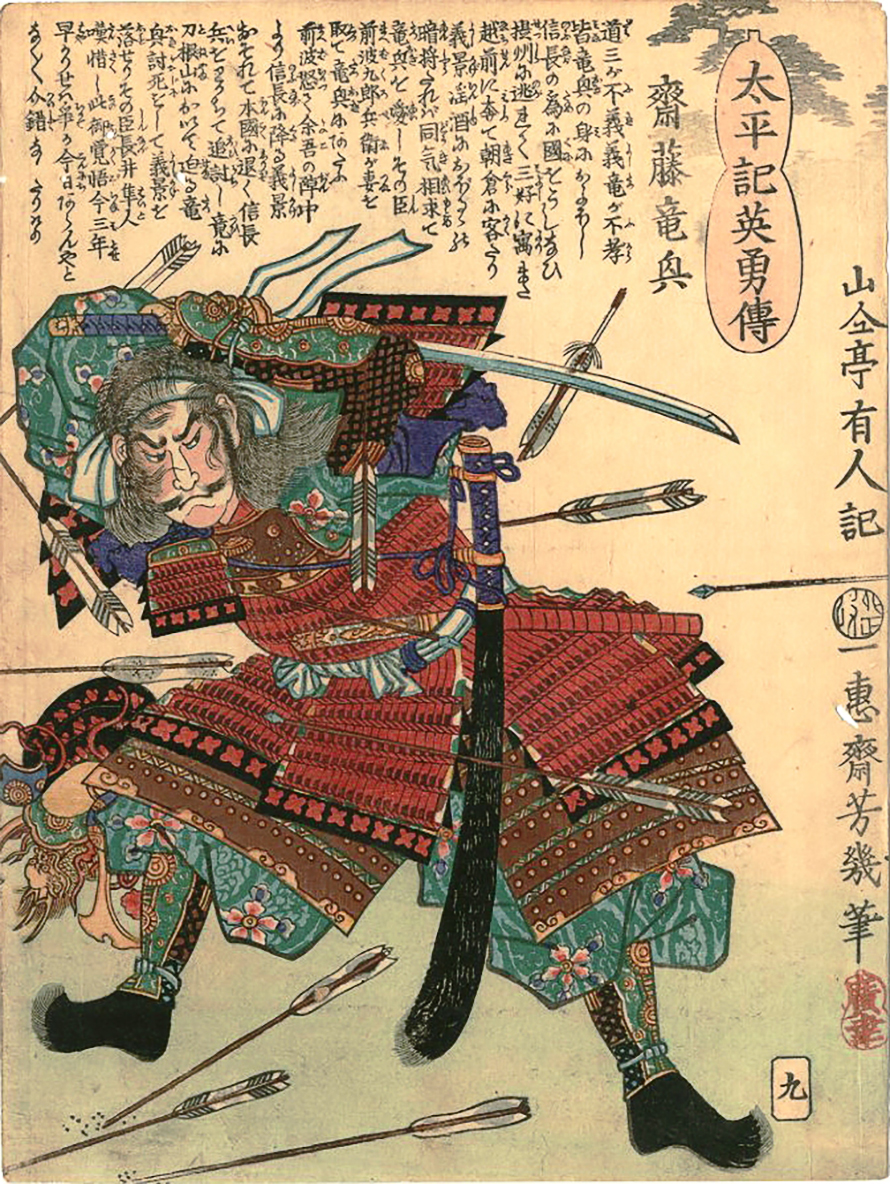
- An ukiyo-e of Saitō Tatsuoki

Head of Saitō clan
- In office 1561–1567
- Preceded by: Saitō Yoshitatsu

Personal details
- Born: 1548
- Died: September 6, 1573 (aged 24–25) Battle of Tonezaka, Echizen Province
- Parent: Saitō Yoshitatsu (father)

Military service
- Allegiance: Saitō clan Asakura clan
- Battles/wars: Siege of Inabayama Castle (1567); Battle of Tonezaka (1573)

Saitō Uhyōe-Taihitsu Tatsuoki (斎藤 右兵衛・大筆 龍興, Saitō Uhyōe-Taihitsu Tatsuoki; 1548–September 6, 1573) was a daimyō in Mino Province during the Sengoku period and the third generation lord of the Saitō clan. He was a son of Saitō Yoshitatsu, grandson of Saitō Dōsan and nephew of Oda Nobunaga's first wife, Nohime. Through his mother, he was also a grandson of Azai Hisamasa and nephew of Azai Nagamasa.

== Biography ==
Saitō Tatsuoki succeeded his father at the age of 13 in 1561. He was, however, an incapable ruler; unlike his father and grandfather.

Tatsuoki became involved in a bitter rivalry with Oda Nobunaga, and lost to him decisively in 1567. He survived, but from this point on the Saitō clan were no longer a significant faction in the power struggles of the Sengoku period.

After Oda Nobunaga conquered the Saito in 1567, he was exiled, though there are at least two accounts of how he managed this. In one account, Tatsuoki abandoned the castle the night before the final attack, took a boat, and fled down the Sunomata River.

In another account, following the breach of the main gate, Hideyoshi dispatched a messenger to the main tower, where Tatsuoki and his entourage were cornered, with assurances of leniency if the Saitō holdouts would surrender. Tatsuoki accepted the offer and, with Nobunaga's troops forming two lines, Tatsuoki marched out of the main tower with his family and retinue.

In any event, Tatsuoki eventually found his way to Nagashima, Ise Province. He lived in exile for a while, but eventually sought refuge with Asakura Yoshikage. He was killed in the Battle of Tonezaka, at the age of 25, in 1573.

== See also ==
- Akaza Shichirōemon - vassal of Saitō Tatsuoki
