= Saitō clan =

Japanese samurai clan

Saitō clan 斎藤氏
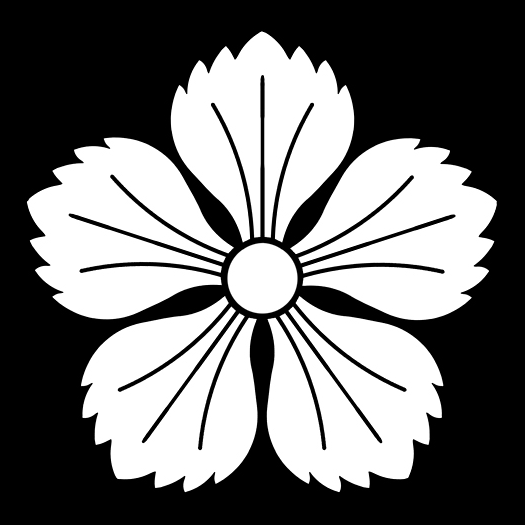
- Home province: Mino
- Parent house: Fujiwara clan (alleged)
- Titles: Daimyō
- Founder: Saitō Dōsan
- Final ruler: Saitō Tatsuoki
- Ruled until: 1567, defeat by Oda Nobunaga

The Saitō clan (Japanese: 斎藤氏, Hepburn: Saitō-shi) was a Japanese samurai clan that ruled Mino province in the Sengoku period. The clan appropriated the name of a defunct samurai clan named "Saitō" that had previously hailed from Echizen province and claimed descent from Fujiwara Toshihito, of the Hokke branch of the Fujiwara clan.

== History ==
The founder of the Saitō clan was Saitō Dōsan (1494–1556), who started out as a Buddhist monk, and later worked as a peddler selling cooking oil. In the 1520s, Dōsan's father was adopted into the Nagai clan, a minor samurai clan. In 1530, Dōsan murdered the head of the Nagai clan and took control. In 1541, Dōsan attacked and overthrew the shugo of Mino province, Toki Yorinari. He then adopted the name "Saitō" from a defunct samurai clan and set himself up as the daimyō of Mino. For his ruthlessness, Dōsan was nicknamed "Viper of Mino" (美濃の蝮, Mino no Mamushi).

Dosan was eventually defeated in 1549 by Oda Nobuhide. Nobuhide made peace with Dōsan by arranging a political marriage between his son and heir, Oda Nobunaga, and Dōsan's daughter, Nōhime. Dōsan, therefore, became the father-in-law of Oda Nobunaga.

Rumors had started to circulate that Dōsan's firstborn son, Saitō Yoshitatsu, was not his natural son and Dōsan started to consider another son, Kiheiji, or even his son-in-law Oda Nobunaga, as his heirs. This caused Yoshitatsu to rebel and kill his two younger brothers. In 1556, the forces of Dōsan and Yoshitatsu clashed in the Battle of Nagara-gawa which resulted in the death of Dōsan.

Saitō Tatsuoki was the son of Yoshitatsu. Tatsuoki was defeated by Oda Nobunaga in 1567, and the clan was extinguished.

== In popular culture ==
The Clan Saito and its fictional leader Lord Nariaki Saito from the PlayStation 5 video game Ghost of Yōtei, are loosely based on this clan.
