= Aya Murakami =

Aya Murakami may refer to:

- Aya Murakami (fighter) (born 1992), Japanese mixed martial artist
- Aya Murakami (investor) (born 1988), Japanese investor

== See also ==
- Murakami (surname)
