= Oda Nagamasu =

Japanese daimyō

- 織田 長益
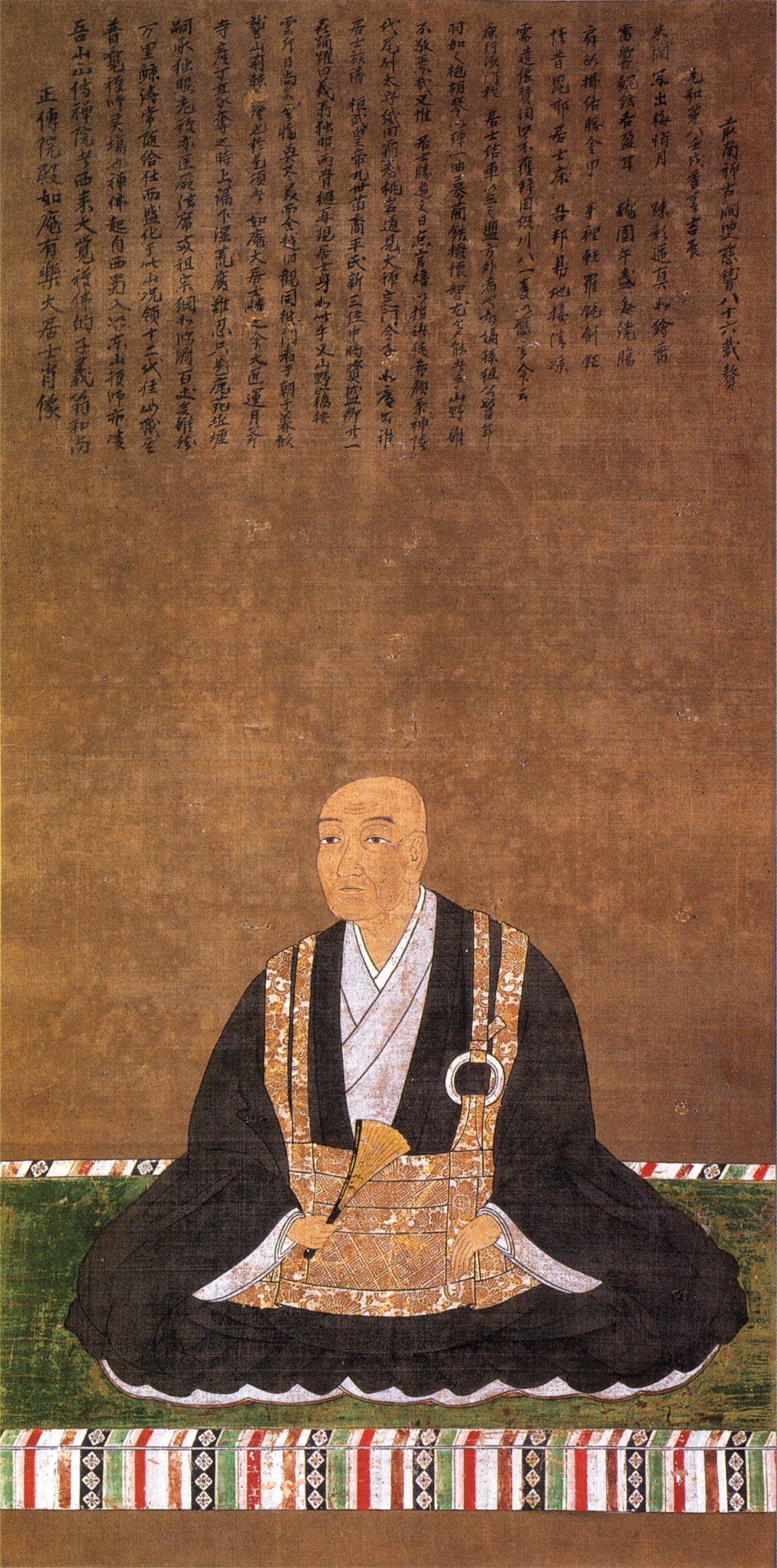

Lord of Chita
- In office 1574–1615

Personal details
- Born: Gengorō; 1547 Owari Province, Japan
- Died: 13 December 1621 (aged 73-74) Kyoto, Yamashiro Province, Japan
- Children: Oda Nagamasa; Oda Hisanaga
- Parent: Oda Nobuhide (father)
- Relatives: Oda Nobunaga (brother)
- Nickname(s): "Yūraku" "Urakusai"

Military service
- Allegiance: Oda clan Tokugawa clan Toyotomi clan Eastern Army; Tokugawa Shogunate
- Unit: Oda clan
- Commands: Ōkusa Castle
- Battles/wars: Siege of Iwamura; Siege of Shigisan; Siege of Itami; Siege of Takato; Battle of Tenmokuzan; Honnō-ji Incident; Siege of Kanie; Battle of Sekigahara

Oda Nagamasu (織田 長益; 1547 – 13 December 1621) was a Japanese daimyō and a brother of Oda Nobunaga who lived from the late Sengoku period through the early Edo period. Also known as Yūraku (有楽) or Urakusai (有楽斎), the Tokyo neighborhood Yūrakuchō is named for him. Nagamasu converted to Christianity in 1588 and took the baptismal name of John.

== Biography ==
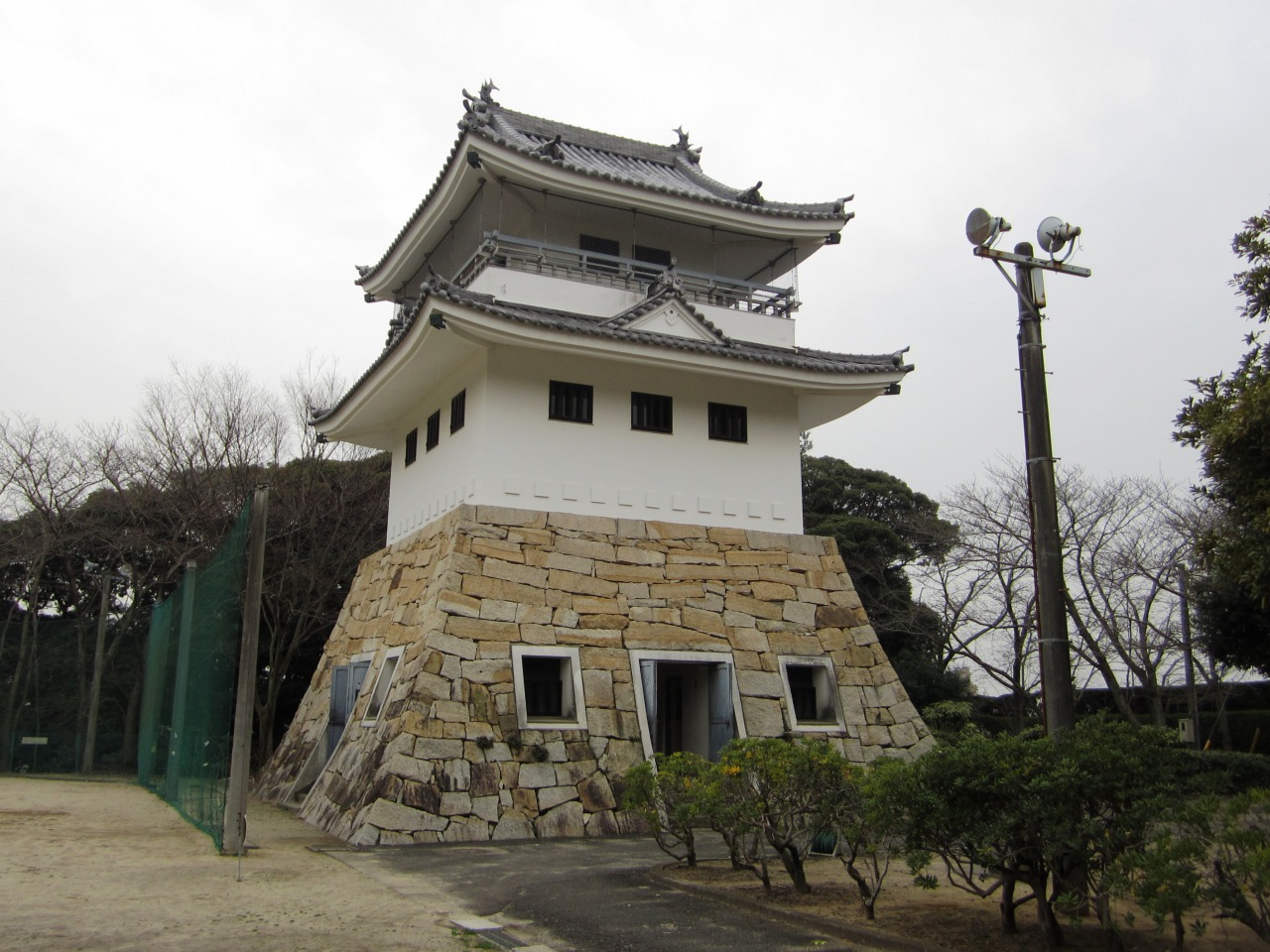
Ōkusa Castle Site

His childhood name was Gengorō (源五郎) and he was the 11th son of Oda Nobuhide. In 1574, he received the Chita District in Owari and the construction of Ōkusa Castle. Later, he was commissioned to serve Oda Nobutada in the Siege of Iwamura (1575), Siege of Shigisan (1577), Siege of Itami (1579), Siege of Takato (1582) and Battle of Tenmokuzan (1582).

Nagamasu was an accomplished practitioner of the Japanese tea ceremony, which he studied under the master, Sen no Rikyū. He eventually started his own school of the tea ceremony.

In June 1582, during the incident at Honnō-ji, he was one of the vassals of Nobutada in Nijō Castle, he was able to survive and fled to Gifu Castle.

In 1584, he then joined Oda Nobukatsu and collaborated with Tokugawa Ieyasu against Hideyoshi at the Komaki - Nagakute campaign and battled against Takigawa Kazumasu at the Siege of Kanie Castle. Later, he was one of the peacemakers between Tokugawa Ieyasu and Toyotomi Hideyoshi, also between Sassa Narimasa and Maeda Toshiie.

In 1600, he sided with Tokugawa Ieyasu and fought at the Battle of Sekigahara. He brought 450 soldiers to join Ieyasu eastern side and confronted Gamō Yorisato (Satoie) from western side. He was awarded 30,000 koku in Yamato Province after the war.

In 1615, Nagamasu divided his fief between his sons Oda Nagamasa and Oda Hisanaga. Nagamasa founded the Kaijū-Shibamura Domain, while Hisanaga became lord of the Yanagimoto Domain. He died in Kyoto on December 13 of 1621. Aged 74.

== Family ==
- Father: Oda Nobuhide (1510–1551)
- Brothers:
  - Oda Nobunaga (1534–1582)
  - Oda Nobuyuki (1536–1558)
  - Oda Hidetaka (1541–1555)
  - Oda Nobuteru (1546–1610)
  - Oda Nobukane (1548–1614)
  - Oda Nobuharu (1544–1570)
  - Oda Nobuoki (died 1570)
  - Oda Hidenari (died 1574)
  - Oda Nagatoshi
- Sisters:
  - Oichi (1547–1583)
  - Oinu
- Half Brothers:
  - Oda Nobuhiro (died 1574)
  - Oda Nobutoki (died 1556)
- Son:
  - Oda Nagamasa (1587–1670)
  - Oda Hisanaga
