= Murakami (surname) =

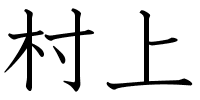
- The kanji representation of 'Murakami'
- Pronunciation: Murakami

Origin
- Language: Japanese
- Meaning: village superior
- Region of origin: Japan

Murakami (村上; "village superior") is a Japanese surname, 35th by frequency in Japan. It can refer to:

== People ==
- Chikako Murakami (basketball) (born 1970), Japanese basketball player
- Chikako Murakami (tennis), Japanese tennis player
- Emperor Murakami, Heian period Japanese emperor
- Daisuke Murakami (figure skater)
- Daisuke Murakami (snowboarder)
- Genzo Murakami (村上元三) (1910–2006), novelist
- Glen Murakami, animator
- Hiroaki Murakami (村上 弘明; born 1956), actor
- Haruki Murakami (村上春樹; born 1949), novelist
- Hiroshi Murakami (村上 寛; born 1948), Japanese jazz drummer
- James J. Murakami, production designer & film Academy nominee
- Jimmy Murakami (1933–2014) also known as Teruaki Murakami (村上輝明), animator and director
- Kanako Murakami (村上 佳菜子; born 1994), figure skater
- Murakami Kijo (村上 鬼城; 1865–1938), Japanese poet
- Les Murakami (born 1936), American college baseball coach
- Mai Murakami, Japanese artistic gymnast
- Maki Murakami, manga artist
- Masaaki Murakami (村上 昌謙; born 1992), Japanese footballer
- Masanori Murakami, San Francisco Giants pitcher
- Megumi Murakami, Japanese pop singer in Cute
- Natsumi Murakami (村上 奈津実; born 1995), Japanese voice actress
- Munetaka Murakami (村上 宗隆), Japanese baseball player
- Nijiro Murakami, Japanese actor and voice actor
- Ryu Murakami (村上龍); writer and filmmaker
- Shingo Murakami (村上信五), Japanese pop singer in Kanjani Eight
- Takeyoshi Murakami (村上武吉), samurai
- Takashi Murakami (村上隆), artist and founder of Superflat movement
- Takeshi Murakami (村上隆; fl. 21st cent.), English teacher & champion in game of Othello
- Takumi Murakami (村上 巧; born 1989), Japanese footballer
- Tetsuji Murakami, karate pioneer in Europe
- Yoshiaki Murakami (村上世彰), corporate raider and president of M&A Consulting

== Fictional characters ==
- Gennosuke Murakami, from the Usagi Yojimbo comic book series
- Kyouji Murakami, from the Tokusatsu TV series, Kamen Rider 555
- Masaki Murakami, from the manga/anime series Guyver
- Murakami Harutomo, from the novel The Samurai's Tale by Erik Christian Haugaard
- Murakami Yagami, from the manga/anime series Blue Seed
- Murakami Natsumi, from the manga/anime series Negima! Magister Negi Magi
- Manzanar Murakami from Karen Tei Yamashita's novel "Tropic of Orange"
- Sho Murakami, from 2017 film Life

== See also ==
- Murakami (disambiguation)
