= Nagamasa =

- Gender: Male

Origin
- Origin: Japanese
- Meaning: Different meanings depending on the kanji used

Nagamasa (written: 長政 or 長正) is a masculine Japanese given name. Notable people with the name include:

- Asano Nagamasa (浅野 長政; 1546–1611), Japanese daimyō
- Azai Nagamasa (浅井 長政; 1545–1573), Japanese daimyō
- Ikeda Nagamasa (池田 長正; 1519–1563), Japanese samurai
- Kizawa Nagamasa (木沢 長政; died 1542), Japanese daimyō
- Kuroda Nagamasa (黒田 長政; 1568–1623), Japanese daimyō
- Oda Nagamasa (織田 長政; 1587–1670), Japanese daimyō
- Yamada Nagamasa (山田 長政; 1590–1630), Japanese explorer
