= Oda Katsunaga =

Japanese samurai

Oda Katsunaga (織田 勝長; born 1569, died June 21, 1582) was a Japanese samurai of the Sengoku period through early Azuchi-Momoyama Period, who was the fifth son of Oda Nobunaga.

== Life ==
At a very young age, Katsunaga, then known as "Gobomaru", was given in adoption to Toyama Kagetou and his wife, Lady Otsuya, at Iwamura Castle. Lady Otsuya was Oda Nobunaga's aunt. In 1572, the castle was captured by Takeda forces under Akiyama Nobutomo, and Gobomaru, then four years old, became a hostage of the Takeda.

In 1581, Takeda Katsuyori released Gobomaru (Katsunaga) to the Oda clan, who returned him to Iwamura Castle, which had been re-taken during his absence.

== Honnō-ji Incident ==
One year later in 1582, Katsunaga accompanied his father, Nobunaga, to Honnō-ji. Following the attack on Honno-ji and the death of Nobunaga, Akechi Mitsuhide attacked Nijō Castle, where Nobunaga's son and Katsunaga's elder brother Nobutada was staying. During the fight, Katsunaga was killed and Nobutada committed seppuku.

== Family ==
- Father: Oda Nobunaga (1536-1582)
- Brothers:
  - Oda Nobutada (1557-1582)
  - Oda Nobukatsu (1558-1630)
  - Oda Nobutaka (1558-1583)
  - Hashiba Hidekatsu (1567-1585)
  - Oda Nobuhide (1571-1597)
  - Oda Nobutaka (1576-1602)
  - Oda Nobuyoshi (1573-1615)
  - Oda Nobusada (1574-1624)
  - Oda Nobuyoshi (died 1609)
  - Oda Nagatsugu (died 1600)
  - Oda Nobumasa (1554-1647)
- Sisters:
  - Tokuhime (1559-1636)
  - Fuyuhime (1561-1641)
  - Hideko (died 1632)
  - Eihime (1574-1623)
  - Hōonin
  - Sannomarudono(d. 1603)
  - Tsuruhime
