= Lady Saigō =

Consort of Tokugawa Ieyasu (1552–1589)

Senior First Rank Lady Saigō
- 西郷局
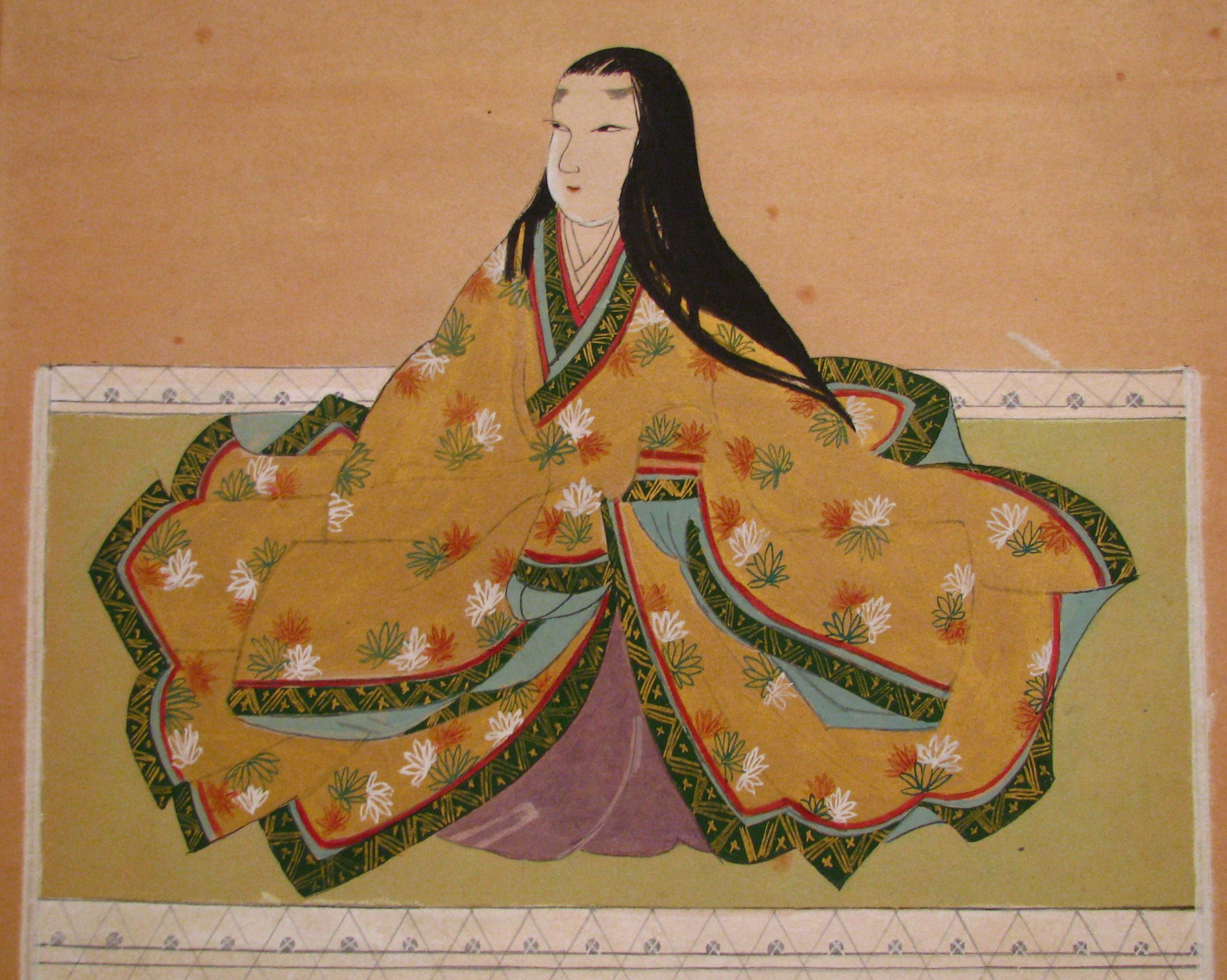
- Portrait of Lady Saigō, Hōdai-in, Shizuoka, Japan
- Born: Tozuka Masako (戸塚昌子); 1552; Nishikawa Castle, Mikawa, Japan
- Died: 1 July 1589 (aged 36–37); Sunpu Castle, Suruga, Japan
- Resting place: Hōdai-in, Shizuoka city 34.970102°N 138.383158°E
- Other name: Saigō no Tsubone
- Partner: Tokugawa Ieyasu
- Children: 4, including Tokugawa Hidetada and Matsudaira Tadayoshi
- Father: Tozuka Tadaharu
- Relatives: Saigō clan; Tokugawa clan
- Honours: Senior First Rank of the Imperial Court

Lady Saigō (西郷局 or 西郷の局 Saigō no Tsubone; 1552 – 1 July 1589), also known as Oai, was one of the concubines of Tokugawa Ieyasu, the samurai lord who unified Japan at the end of the sixteenth century and then ruled as shōgun. She was also the mother of the second Tokugawa shōgun, Tokugawa Hidetada. Her contributions were considered so significant that she was posthumously inducted to the Senior First Rank of the Imperial Court, the highest honor that could be conferred by the Emperor of Japan.

During their relationship, Lady Saigō influenced Ieyasu's philosophies, choice of allies, and policies as he rose to power during the late Sengoku period, and she thus had an indirect effect on the organization and composition of the Tokugawa shogunate. Although less is known of her than some other figures of the era, she is generally regarded as the "power behind the throne", and her life has been compared to a "Cinderella story" of feudal Japan.

Once she was in a respected and secure position as the official concubine and mother to Ieyasu's heir, Lady Saigō used her influence and wealth for charitable purposes. A devout Buddhist, she donated money to temples in Suruga Province, where she resided as the consort of Ieyasu, first in Hamamatsu Castle and later in Sunpu Castle. As she was quite near-sighted, she also established a charitable organization that assisted visually impaired women with no other means of support. Lady Saigō died at a fairly young age, under somewhat mysterious circumstances. Although murder was suspected, no culprit was identified.

Lady Saigō bore four children: she had a son and a daughter (Saigō Katsutada and Tokuhime) while married, and she later bore two sons as the consort of Tokugawa Ieyasu: Tokugawa Hidetada and Matsudaira Tadayoshi. Among the descendants of Lady Saigō was the Empress Meishō (1624–1696), one of very few women to accede to the Chrysanthemum Throne as empress regnant.

== Name ==
The term "Saigō-no-Tsubone", used in most historical texts, is an official title rather than a name. As an adult she was adopted into the Saigō clan, so she was permitted to use the surname. Later, when she was named first consort of Tokugawa Ieyasu, the title "tsubone" (pronounced [tsɯbone]) was appended to the surname. The title was one of several titular suffixes conferred on high-ranking women (others include -kata and -dono). The bestowal of a title depended on social class and the relationship with her samurai lord, such as whether she was a legitimate wife or a concubine, and whether or not she had had children by him. The word tsubone indicates the living quarters reserved for ladies of a court, and it became the title for those who had been granted private quarters, such as high-ranking concubines with children. This title, tsubone, was in use for concubines from the Heian period until the Meiji period (from the eighth century to the early twentieth century), and is commonly translated to the English title "Lady".

Though Lady Saigō's given name does not appear in surviving documents from the time, there is good evidence it was Masako (昌子), but this name is very rarely used. Her most commonly used name was Oai (お愛 or 於愛, meaning "love") and most sources agree this was a nickname she gained as a child. Intimate friends and family would call her Oai throughout her life, and it is the name most often used in modern popular cultural references. Following death, she was bestowed with a Buddhist posthumous name, and an abbreviation of that name, Hōdai-in (宝台院), is sometimes used out of pious respect.

== Background ==
The Saigō family was one branch of the distinguished Kikuchi clan of Kyushu that had migrated northward to Mikawa Province in the fifteenth century. In 1524, the forces of Matsudaira Kiyoyasu (1511–1536), the grandfather of Tokugawa Ieyasu, stormed and took the Saigō clan's headquarters at Yamanaka Castle during his conquest of the Mikawa region. Shortly after the battle, Saigō Nobusada, the third head of the Saigō, submitted to the Matsudaira clan. Following the untimely death of Kiyoyasu in 1536, and the ineffectual leadership and early death of Matsudaira Hirotada (1526–1549), the leaderless Matsudaira clan finally submitted to Imagawa Yoshimoto (1519–1560) of Suruga Province, east of Mikawa. When the Matsudaira fell to the Imagawa, the clans of their retainers, which included the Saigō, likewise submitted to the Imagawa. Following the Battle of Okehazama (1560), Saigō Masakatsu attempted to re-assert the independence of the clan while yielding some land concessions to the Imagawa. In response, Imagawa Ujizane arrested thirteen Saigō men, and had them vertically impaled near Yoshida Castle. The executions did not deter the Saigō, and in 1562 the Imagawa launched punitive invasions of east Mikawa and attacked the two main Saigō castles. Masakatsu was killed in the battle of Gohonmatsu Castle; his eldest son Motomasa was killed during the battle for Wachigaya Castle. Clan leadership passed to Masakatsu's son, Saigō Kiyokazu (1533–1594), who pledged his loyalty to the Matsudaira clan, under the leadership of Tokugawa Ieyasu, in their mutual struggle against the Imagawa. In 1569, the power of the Imagawa ended with the siege of Kakegawa Castle.

Neither the name of Lady Saigō's mother nor her dates of birth or death are recorded in any existing documents, although it is known that she was the elder sister of Saigō Kiyokazu. Lady Saigō's father was Tozuka Tadaharu of Tōtōmi Province, under direct control of the Imagawa clan. The marriage between Tadaharu and his wife was very likely arranged by the Imagawa clan.

== Biography ==
=== Early life ===
Lady Saigō was born in 1552 at Nishikawa Castle, a branch castle of the Saigō clan, and very likely given the name of Masako soon after birth. Japanese marriages are not usually matrilocal, but Tadaharu may have been assigned to Nishikawa Castle as an agent of the Imagawa. Masako spent her childhood with her two siblings in bucolic eastern Mikawa Province, and at some point gained the nickname Oai. In 1554, her father Tadaharu died in the Battle of Enshu-Omori, between the Imagawa and the Hōjō clan. Two years later her mother married Hattori Masanao; the union resulted in four children, though only two survived to adulthood.

Some sources state that upon reaching "adulthood" Oai married,^{Note a} but was widowed soon afterward. The husband's name is not mentioned and there were apparently no children. Other sources do not mention the marriage, or suggest that there never was an earlier "first" marriage. It is known with certainty that in 1567, Oai married Saigō Yoshikatsu, her cousin and the son of Motomasa, who had already had two children by his late wife. Oai bore two children by Yoshikatsu: their son, Saigō Katsutada, was born about 1570; they also had a daughter, possibly named Tokuhime.^{Note b}

In 1571, Saigō Yoshikatsu was killed at the Battle of Takehiro, fighting the invading forces of the Takeda clan led by Akiyama Nobutomo. Soon after Yoshikatsu's death, Oai was formally adopted by her uncle, Saigō Kiyokazu, then the head of the Saigō clan, though she chose to live with her mother in the house of her stepfather.

=== Tokugawa Ieyasu ===
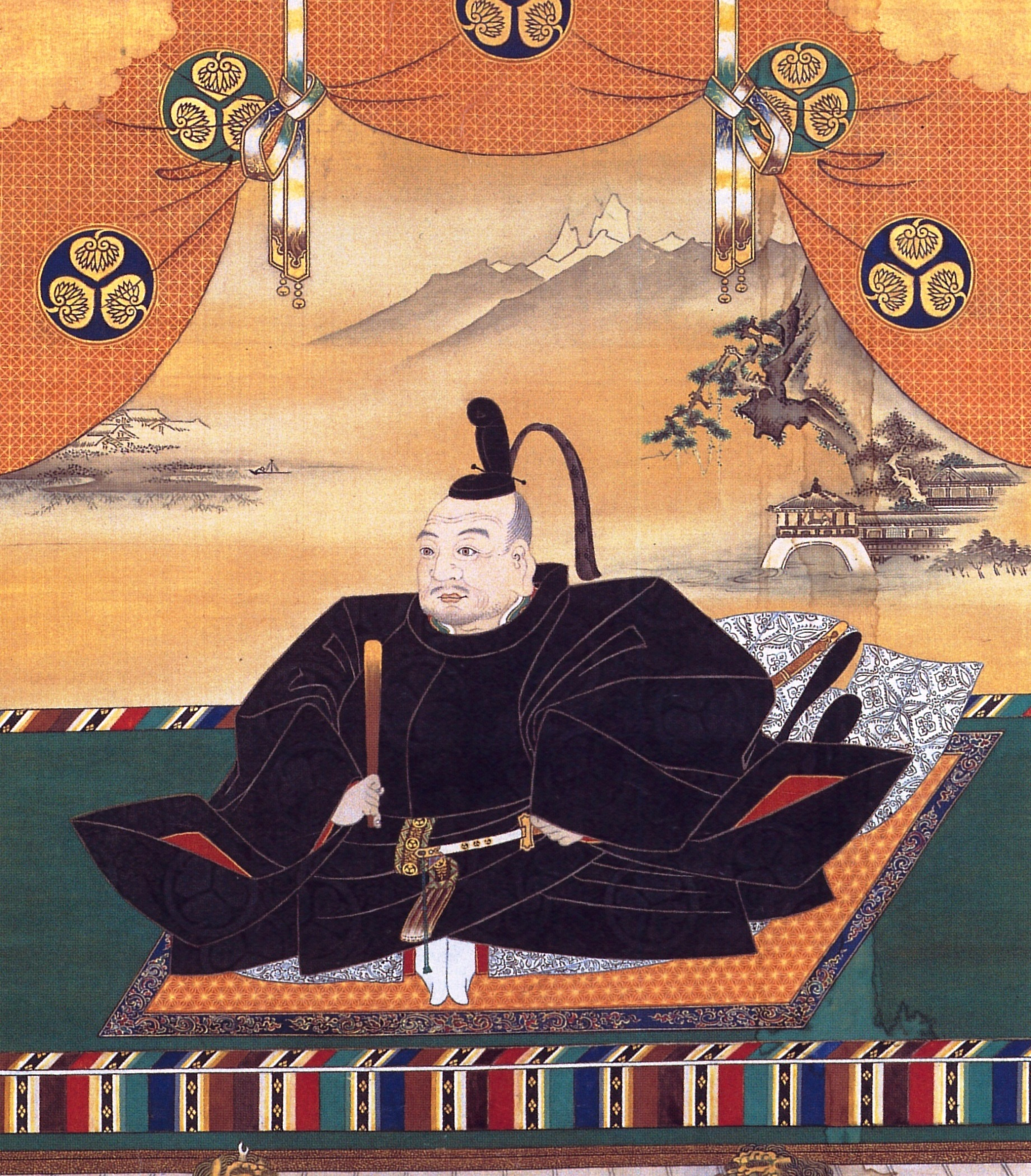
Tokugawa Ieyasu

Oai first met Tokugawa Ieyasu at about the age of 17 or 18, when he visited the Saigō family and Oai served him tea. It is believed she caught his eye on that occasion, but as she was still married, nothing came of it at the time. Later, during the 1570s, it is believed that friendship and genuine affection developed between the two. This view contradicts a common impression which maintains that Ieyasu was a ruthless leader who treated all the women in his life, and all of his offspring, as commodities to be used as needed to serve the clan or his own ambitions. However, it is also known that he valued personal merit over bloodlines. During this time, Ieyasu had a house built in eastern Mikawa, far from the residence of his wife, the Lady Tsukiyama, in Okazaki. The marriage between Ieyasu and Lady Tsukiyama had been arranged by her uncle, Imagawa Yoshimoto, ostensibly to help cement ties between the two clans, though Ieyasu found it difficult to live with his wife's jealousy, tempestuous moods, and eccentric habits.

Starting around the time of the Battle of Mikatagahara (1573), perhaps in its aftermath, Ieyasu began to confide in Oai and sought her counsel on various matters. It may have been during this period that the two commenced an amorous relationship. Oai is credited with advising Ieyasu as the Battle of Nagashino (1575) approached, a major turning point in both Ieyasu's career and the history of Japan. It is also thought that Ieyasu continued to seek her advice concerning other battles and alliances, even as late as the Komaki-Nagakute Campaign (1584).

In the spring of 1578, Oai moved to Hamamatsu Castle, where she took over management of the kitchen. She became very popular with the unit of warriors from her native province, who not only admired her beauty, but regarded her as a gentle and virtuous example of the women of Mikawa. While her manners and gentility were exemplary, she could, when the occasion warranted, be outspoken or sarcastic in speech, the probable result of growing up around rustic warriors in a remote castle outpost. With her move to the court of Ieyasu, Oai entered a bitter arena where prospective concubines schemed and competed with each other for a chance to bear Ieyasu's child. Bearing the child of a powerful samurai, especially a son, was one way an ambitious young woman of the period could elevate her status, ensure a comfortable life, and guarantee the prosperity of her family. These women usually relied on their physical attributes and sexual prowess to keep their lord's attention, and some resorted to the use of aphrodisiacs. Unlike these courtesans, Oai already had the attention of Ieyasu, which would have undermined the ambitions of some and very likely made her a target of resentment, hostility, and the intrigues that were common in Japanese harems.

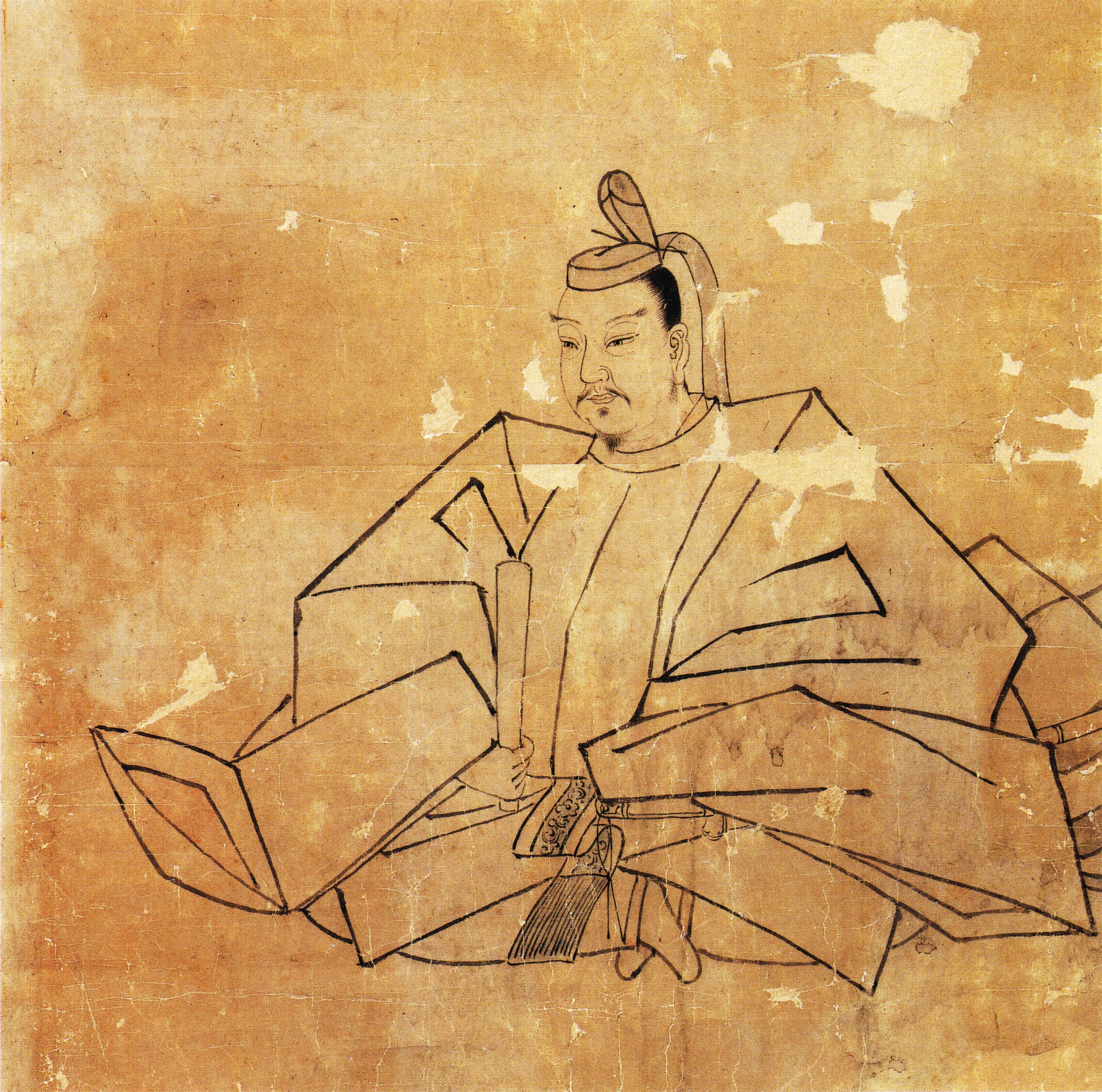
Tokugawa Hidetada, son of Ieyasu and Lady Saigō

While Ieyasu's marriage was arranged for political reasons, and many of his later concubines were chosen in the same spirit, it is thought that he chose his relationship with Lady Saigō. Despite the image of Ieyasu as a calculating and stoic warlord, there was no new political advantage to the match, as the Saigō were already loyal vassals, and thus texts about Lady Saigō refer to her as the "most beloved" of Ieyasu's women. Moreover, Ieyasu valued her for her intelligence and sound advice and it is believed that he enjoyed her company and calm demeanor as well as their common background in Mikawa province. On 2 May 1579, Oai gave birth to Ieyasu's third son, who would become known as Tokugawa Hidetada. The news was probably a shock to all who had an interest in Ieyasu, but with the event, Oai's position became more secure and she was accepted as the first consort of Ieyasu. Based on this relationship, and out of respect for her gentle manner and devotion to Ieyasu, she became known by the respectful title of Saigō-no-Tsubone, or Lady Saigō.

In the same year, Oda Nobunaga was informed that Lady Tsukiyama had conspired against him with the Takeda clan. Although evidence was weak, Ieyasu re-assured his ally by having his wife executed by the shore of Lake Sanaru in Hamamatsu. Tokugawa Nobuyasu, Ieyasu's first son by Lady Tsukiyama, was held in confinement until Ieyasu ordered him to commit seppuku. With their deaths, Lady Saigō's position at court was unassailable. With the death of Nobuyasu, Hidetada became Ieyasu's heir apparent.^{Note c}

Ieyasu's fourth son, the second by Lady Saigō, was born on 18 October 1580. He would become known as Matsudaira Tadayoshi, after he was adopted by Matsudaira Ietada, the head of the Fukōzu branch of the Matsudaira clan. In the same year, Lady Saigō had a temple founded in her mother's memory, indicating she had died by that point. In 1586, Lady Saigō was at the side of Ieyasu when he entered the newly reconstructed Sunpu Castle in triumph. This was a highly symbolic celebration of his victories over his enemies and the subjugation of the region, but it was also a visible and symbolic gesture to Lady Saigō, a way that Ieyasu could credit her for her assistance, and publicly demonstrate the esteem in which he regarded her.

=== Charity ===
While at Sunpu Castle, Lady Saigō worshipped at a Buddhist temple called Ryūsen-ji (龍泉寺). She became devoted to the teachings of the Pure Land sect and was known for her piety and charity. Because she suffered a high degree of myopia, she often donated money, clothing, food, and other necessities to blind women and organizations that assisted them. She eventually founded a co-operative school with living quarters near Ryūsen-ji that assisted indigent blind women by teaching them how to play the shamisen (traditional stringed instrument) as a vocation, and helped them to find employment. These women were known as goze, and were akin to traveling minstrels in Edo period Japan. The women were granted membership to the guild-like organization, and musicians with apprentices were dispatched to various destinations. They played pieces from a sanctioned repertoire, and operated under a strict code of rules on behavior and permissible business transactions intended to maintain an upstanding reputation. On her deathbed, Lady Saigō wrote a letter pleading for the continued maintenance of the organization.

=== Death ===
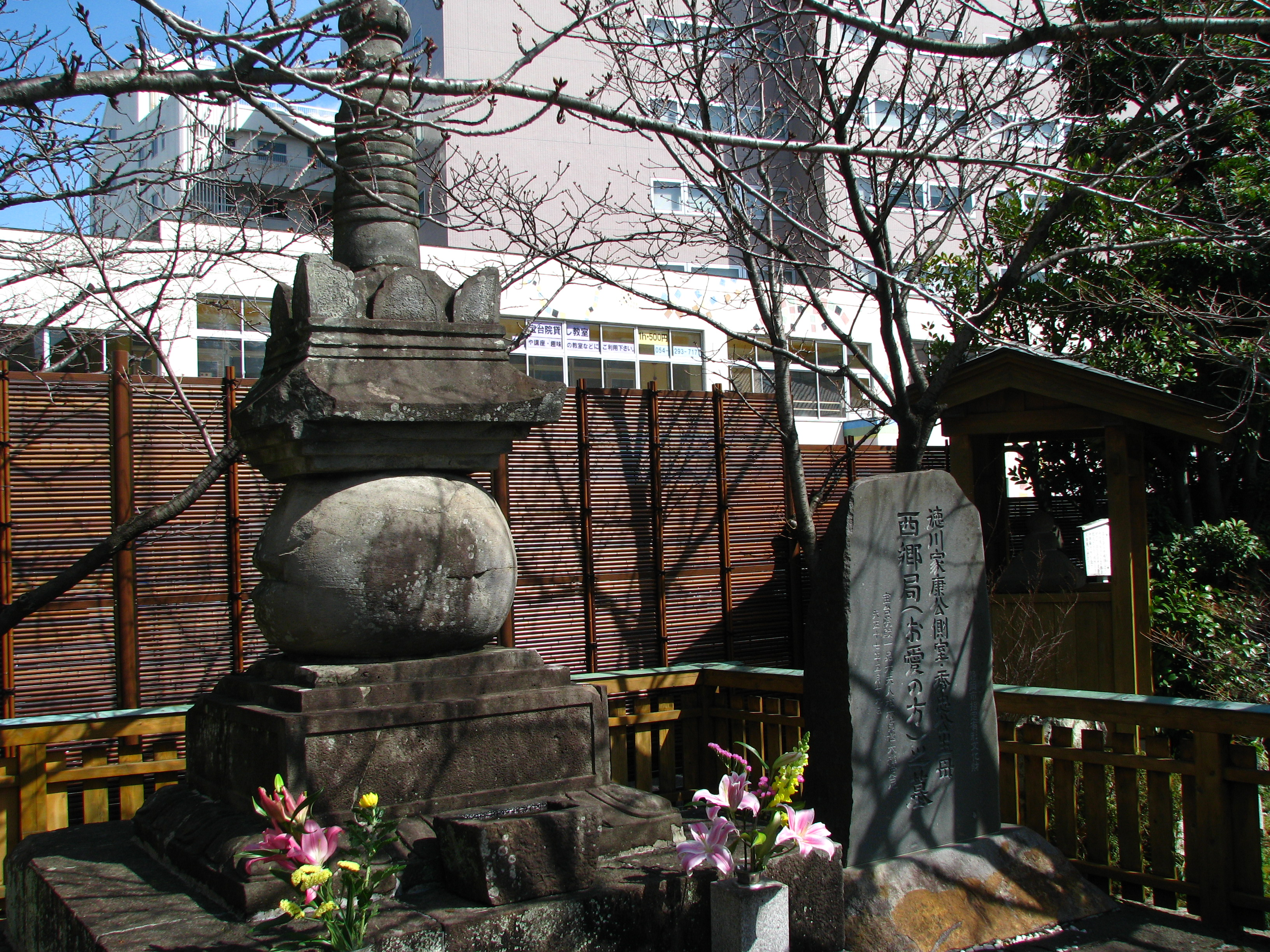
Grave of Lady Saigō

Within a short time after taking up residence in Sunpu Castle, Lady Saigō's health began to deteriorate. It was said that "physical and emotional hardships" were taking their toll on her health, but nothing could be done to help her. Lady Saigō died on 1 July 1589, at the age of 37. The cause of her early death was never determined, and while murder was suspected at the time, no culprit was identified. There were later rumors that she was poisoned by a maidservant devoted to Ieyasu's late wife, the Lady Tsukiyama.

By the time of her death, Lady Saigō was treated as Ieyasu's wife in deed if not in word. The remains of Lady Saigō were interred at Ryūsen-ji. At her death, a number of blind women reportedly gathered in front of the temple and prayed.

== Legacy ==
Tokugawa Ieyasu continued his campaigns allied with Toyotomi Hideyoshi. After their victory at the siege of Odawara Castle in 1590, Ieyasu agreed to relinquish all of his domains to Hideyoshi in exchange for the Kantō region to the east. Hideyoshi died in 1598. By 1603, Ieyasu had recovered Sunpu Castle and completed his unification of Japan, and had been named shōgun by the Emperor. The following year, he had Ryūsen-ji moved from Yunoki to Kōyamachi^{Note d} near Sunpu Castle and attended Buddhist funeral rites conducted in honor of the late Lady Saigō on the anniversary of her death. To mark the occasion, Ieyasu presented the temple priests with the katana he inherited from his father, and a portrait of himself as he looked at the time. These items can still be viewed at the temple in Shizuoka city.

In 1628, Tokugawa Hidetada, by then the retired second shōgun, attended ceremonies conducted in honor of his late mother on the anniversary of her death. These ceremonies were meant to help her spirit achieve buddha status. He also saw to it that she was made the honored tutelary patron of the temple by having her posthumous name changed and the first three characters appended to the name of the temple. Today, the temple Ryūsen-ji is known mainly by that appellation, Hōdai-in (宝台院). At the same time, the Emperor Go-Mizunoo conferred the name Minamoto Masako (源 晶子) upon Lady Saigō, in effect posthumously adopting her into the Minamoto clan, the extended family of the Imperial line. The new name was then inducted into the Lower First Rank of the Imperial Court. Her status was later upgraded to Senior First Rank, the highest and most prominent award, then or now, bestowed by the Emperor to a few subjects outside the Imperial family who had significantly and positively affected the history of Japan.

In 1938, the mausoleum of Lady Saigō at Hōdai-in, which consisted of a five-tiered stupa over her grave and a sanctuary for the veneration of her spirit, was designated an Important Cultural Property. The designation was rescinded after the entire temple complex was destroyed in the Great Shizuoka Fire on 15 January 1940. The stupa remains, though evidence of the damage suffered when it toppled over is plainly visible. Many of the treasures of the temple, including a portrait of Lady Saigō and the sword and portrait bequeathed by Tokugawa Ieyasu in 1604, were saved by the priests who flung the objects out of windows and doorways before fleeing the burning temple. The temple was rebuilt using steel-reinforced concrete in 1970. Historical artifacts saved from the fire of 1940 are on display at the new Hōdai-in temple in Shizuoka city.

== Notable descendants ==
Lady Saigō was the ancestral mother to the line of shōguns that began with the second Edo-period shōgun, Tokugawa Hidetada, and ended with the seventh, Tokugawa Ietsugu (1709–1716). Aside from this, Lady Saigō also became connected to the Imperial line. In 1620, Hidetada's daughter, Tokugawa Masako (1607–1678), married Emperor Go-Mizunoo and entered the Imperial palace. As empress consort, Masako helped maintain the Imperial Court, supported the arts, and significantly influenced the next three monarchs: the first was her daughter, and the two that followed, Emperors Go-Kōmyō and Go-Sai, were sons of Emperor Go-Mizunoo by different concubines. The daughter of Masako, and thus great-granddaughter of Lady Saigō, was Princess Okiko (1624–1696), who acceded to the Chrysanthemum Throne in 1629 as Empress Meishō. She reigned for fifteen years as the 109th monarch of Japan, the seventh of only eight empresses regnant in the history of Japan, until she abdicated in 1643.

== See also ==
- Azuchi–Momoyama period

== Notes ==
a. For women of feudal Japan, "adulthood" was attained at an individual's genpuku ceremony, held sometime between the ages of 13 and 15. Upon reaching the state of adulthood, the young woman shaved her eyebrows for the first time, colored her teeth black, and was considered eligible for marriage.
b. Oai's daughter Tokuhime should not be confused with either Toku-hime, daughter of Ieyasu and Lady Nishigori, or Tokuhime, daughter of Oda Nobunaga.
c. Ieyasu's second son was born in 1574 by his wife's lady-in-waiting; he was shunned by his father and later given in adoption to an ally.
d. Both Yunoki and Kōyamachi are now part of Aoi Ward, Shizuoka City.

== Bibliography ==
- Aichi Board of Education (1998). 愛知県中世城館跡調査報告 [Survey Report of Castle Hall Sites from the Medieval Period of Aichi Prefecture] (in Japanese). Vol. 3: East Mikawa Region. Nagoya, Japan: Association for the Diffusion of Books and Maps of Cultural Assets.
- Akiyama, Terukazu (1990). "Women Painters at the Heian Court". In Marsha Weider (ed.). Flowering in the Shadows: Women in the History of Chinese and Japanese Painting. Meribeth Graybill. Honolulu, Hawaii: University of Hawaii Press. pp. 159–184. ISBN 978-0-8248-1149-5.
- Beard, Mary Ritter (1953). The Force of Women in Japanese History. Washington, D.C.: Public Affairs Press. ISBN 978-0-8183-0167-4.
- Bryant, Anthony J. (26 May 1994). Samurai 1550–1600. Oxford: Osprey Publishing. ISBN 978-1-85532-345-2.
- Downer, Lesley (2008). "Secrets of the Shogun's Harem". Archived from the original on 3 June 2012.
- Frederic, Louis (2002). Japan Encyclopedia. Kathe Roth. Cambridge, US: Harvard University Press. ISBN 978-0-674-01753-5.
- Fritsch, Ingrid (1992). "Blind Female Musicians on the Road: The Social Organization of Goze in Japan". Chime. 5 (Spring): 58–64. ISSN 0926-7263.
- Griffis, William (1883). The Mikado's Empire. Vol. I. New York: Harper & Brothers.
- Griffis, William (1915). The Mikado: Institution and Person. Princeton, New Jersey: Princeton University Press. p. 88. ISBN 978-1-279-41346-3. "tsubone concubine."
- Groemer, Gerald (2001). "The Guild of the Blind in Tokugawa Japan". Monumenta Nipponica. 56 (3): 349–80. doi:10.2307/3096791. JSTOR 3096791.
- Hata, Hisako (2008). "9: Servants of the Inner Quarters: The Women of the Shogun's Great Interior". In Anne Walthall (ed.). Servants of the Dynasty: Palace Women in World History. Berkeley and Los Angeles, California: University of California Press. pp. 172–90. ISBN 978-0-520-25443-5. Archived from the original on 1 July 2023.
- Hōdai-in (2010). "宝台院の由来" [History of Hōdai-in]. Hōdai-in: Konpei-san, Jodo sect (in Japanese). Archived from the original on 22 July 2011.
- Hyodo, Masao; Fujii, Takashi; Fujita, Shizuyo; Yoshikawa, Toshiaki, eds. (2007). 豊橋百科事典 [Toyohashi Encyclopedia] (in Japanese). Toyohashi, Japan: Toyohashi City Department of Citizens' Culture, Culture Section.
- Imperial Household Agency (2004). "明正天皇 月輪陵" [Empress Meisho, Tsukinowanomisasagi]. 天皇陵 [The Imperial Tombs] (in Japanese). Imperial Household Agency. Archived from the original on 6 June 2011.
- Ito, Mitsuyoshi (2003). 戦災等による焼先文化財 [List of Registered Important Cultural Properties which were Removed from the Official File because of Damage caused by Fires and Other Causes] (in Japanese). Tokyo: Ebisu-Kosoyo Publication Co., Ltd.
- Kobayashi, Sadayoshi; Makino, Noboru (1994). 西郷氏興亡全史 [Complete History of the Rise and Fall of the Saigō Clan] (in Japanese). Tokyo: Rekishi Chosakenkyu-jo.
- Levy, Howard Seymour (1971). Sex, Love, and the Japanese. Tokyo: Warm-Soft Village Press.
- Lillehoj, Elizabeth (1996). "Tōfukumon'in: Empress, Patron and Artist". Woman's Art Journal. 17 (1): 28–34. doi:10.2307/1358526. JSTOR 1358526.
- Lin, Irene H. (2002). "The Ideology of Imagination: The Tale of Shuten Dōji as a Kenmon Discourse". Cahiers d'Extrême-Asie. 13: 379–410. doi:10.3406/asie.2002.1188. Archived from the original on 1 July 2023.
- Mochida, Shinzaemon (2000–2013). "日本史人物列伝: 西郷局(お愛の方)" [Series of Biographies on Japanese Historical Figures]. よろパラ 文学歴史の10 (in Japanese).
- Murdoch, James (1996). A History of Japan. Vol. III. London: Routledge. ISBN 978-0-415-15417-8. Archived from the original on 1 July 2023.
- Nakashima, Michiko (1999). 徳川三代と女房たち [Three Generations of the Tokugawa and their Women] (in Japanese). Kyoto, Japan: Ritsubu.
- Nihon Hakugaku Kurabu, ed. (2007). 大奥のすべてがわかる本: 知られざる徳川250年の裏面史 [Book about the Great Interior: Understanding the Tokugawa through 250 Years of Hidden Historical Background]. Kyoto: PHP Research Institute. ISBN 978-4-569-69475-7.
- Ponsonby-Fane, Richard Arthur Brabazon (1959). The Imperial House of Japan. Kyoto: Ponsonby Memorial Society. Archived from the original on 1 July 2023.
- Sadler, A.L. (1937). The Maker of Modern Japan: The Life of Shogun Tokugawa Ieyasu. London: George Allen and Unwin, Ltd. ISBN 978-0-8048-1297-9.
- Screech, Timon (2006). Secret Memoirs of the Shoguns: Isaac Titsingh and Japan, 1779–1822. London: RoutledgeCurzon. ISBN 978-0-7007-1720-0.
- Titsingh, Isaac (1834). Annales des empereurs du Japon. Paris: Oriental Translation Fund of Great Britain and Ireland. "nipon o dai itsi ran."
- Totman, Conrad (1983). Tokugawa Ieyasu: Shogun. San Francisco: Heian International, Inc. ISBN 978-0-89346-210-9.
- Ueno, Chizuko (2009). The Modern Family in Japan: Its Rise and Fall. Balwyn North, Australia: Trans Pacific Press. ISBN 978-1-876843-62-5.
- Zenkoku Rekishi Kyoiku Kenkyu Kyogitai (ed.). 日本史用語集 [Glossary of Japanese History]. Vol. B. Tokyo: Yamagawa Publishers.
