= Murakami =

Murakami may refer to:

- 3295 Murakami, a minor planet
- Murakami (crater), an impact crater on the far side of the Moon
- Murakami (name), a Japanese surname, including a list of people with the name
- Murakami, Niigata, a city in Niigata prefecture
- Murakami Domain, a clan within Feudal Japan
- "Murakami", a song by Russian rock singer Svetlana Surganova
- "Murakami", a song on the 2015 album Without My Enemy What Would I Do by U.S. band Made In Heights

== See also ==
- Murakami Station (disambiguation)
