= Siege of Iwamura Castle =

Battle in Japan

Siege of Iwamura
- Part of the Sengoku period
Date	1572
Location	Iwamura Castle, Mino province, Japan
Result	Akiyama victory

Belligerents
Takeda clan	Oda clan

Commanders and leaders
Akiyama Nobutomo; Baba Nobuharu	Lady Otsuya (surrendered)

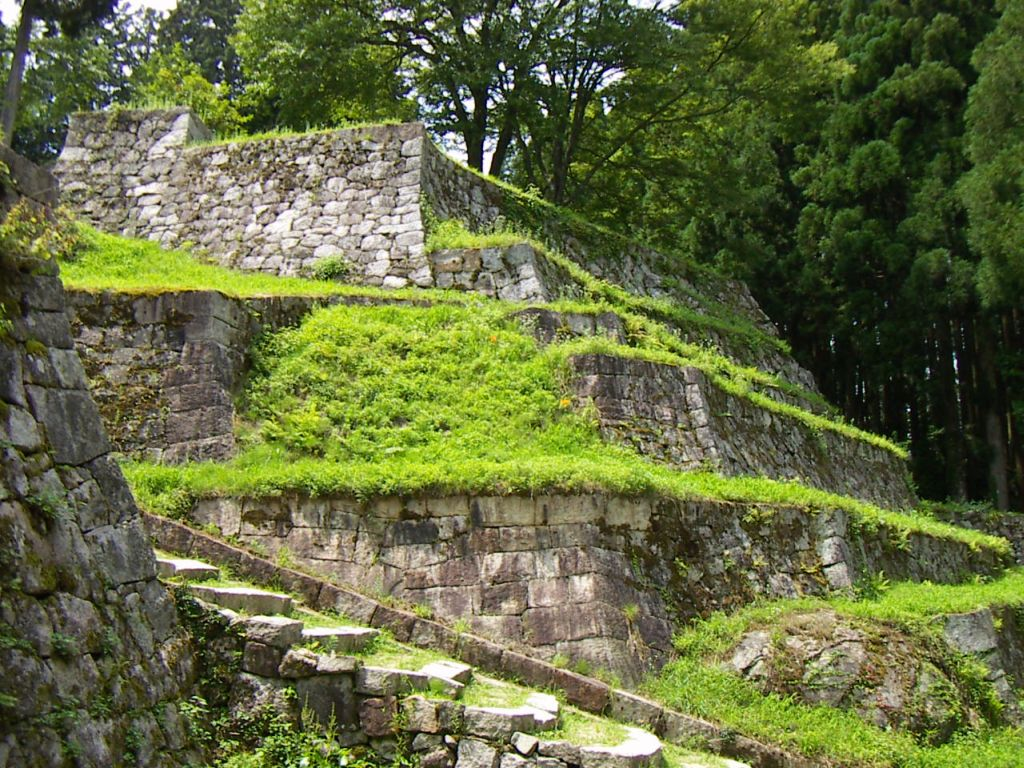
Iwamura castle historical site

The siege of Iwamura was a military event which occurred in 1572 in Japan, concurrent with Takeda Shingen's push into Tōtōmi Province and the Battle of Mikatagahara.

Akiyama Nobutomo, one of Shingen's "Twenty-Four Generals," set his eye on the great yamashiro (mountain castle) of Iwamura when Tōyama Kagetō, the commander of the castle's garrison, fell ill and died.

Akiyama negotiated the castle's surrender with Lady Otsuya, who was not only Tōyama's widow but also the aunt of Oda Nobunaga. The heir to the castle was a four-year-old boy called Gobōmaru, the fifth son of Oda Nobunaga, who had been given to Tōyama to adopt and raise as his own. Gobomaru was taken to the Takeda home in Kai province as a hostage. In accordance with the surrender treaty, Lady Otsuya married Akiyama.

This caused the Takeda-Oda relationship to decline and Nobunaga started a campaign against the Takeda clan.
