= Akiyama Nobutomo =

Japanese samurai (1527–1575)

- 秋山 信友
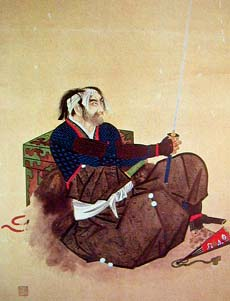
- Born: 1527; Tsutsujigasaki Hall, Kai Province
- Died: Dec 28, 1575 (aged 47-48); Mino Province
- Relatives: Father: Akiyama Nobutou; Wife: Lady Otsuya
- Military career
- Allegiance: Takeda clan 武田氏
- Nicknames: Raging Bull of the Takeda 武田の猛牛
- Conflicts: Battle of Takehiro (1571); Siege of Iwamura (1572)

Akiyama Nobutomo (秋山 信友; 1527 – December 28, 1575), also known as Akiyama Torashige (秋山 虎繁) was a samurai during the Sengoku period in Japan. He is known as one of the "Twenty-Four Generals of Takeda Shingen". Nobutomo also served under Shingen's son, Takeda Katsuyori.

== Biography ==
In 1527, Akiyama Nobutomo was born at Tsutsujigasaki Castle (躑躅ヶ崎館) in Kai province. His father was Akiyama Nobutou, a descendant of Takeda Mitsutomo, and a member of a cadet branch of the Takeda clan. When Nobutomo came of age, he entered the service of Takeda Shingen, patriarch of the clan and lord of Kai province, in the mountainous area of central Japan. In 1547, during the campaign for the Ina district, Nobutomo distinguished himself in battle and was granted a fief in the northern half of Ina, present day Kamiina District in Nagano prefecture. Nobutomo continued his service, most often tasked with defensive duties and holding such castles as Takatō Castle and Iida Castle. During this time, Nobutomo acquired the nickname Takeda no Mogyu (武田の猛牛) (literally: Raging Bull of the Takeda Clan).

By 1568, Nobutomo was highly regarded enough to be entrusted with diplomatic duties. In that year, he was dispatched to Gifu Castle where he represented his lord, Takeda Shingen, at the wedding ceremony of Oda Nobutada, eldest son of Nobunaga, and Matsuhime, daughter of Shingen.

In 1571, Takeda Shingen organized a campaign against Tokugawa Ieyasu, intent on taking the coastal lowlands of Tōtōmi province and pushing westward toward the fertile fields of Mikawa province. Nobutomo was recalled from Iida Castle and ordered to lead an invasion of Mino province. His advance was checked by troops of the Saigo clan, led by Saigo Yoshikatsu. The two armies met at the Battle of Takehiro, and though Yoshikatsu was killed in action, Nobutomo was forced to retreat.

In 1572, the Takeda organized another campaign against Mikawa province which would culminate in the Battle of Mikatagahara in January 1573. As Takeda Shingen drove south and west, Nobutomo would descend from the north, cutting off an escape route and blocking reinforcements. To accomplish this, Nobutomo laid siege to Iwamura Castle. When Toyama Kagetou, lord of Iwamura Castle, died of a sudden illness, the morale of the defending troops collapsed, and the Lady Otsuya (Kageto's widow and an aunt of Oda Nobunaga) entered into negotiations with Nobutomo. They agreed on a treaty, and under its terms the castle was surrendered without bloodshed, and Lady Otsuya agreed to marry Nobutomo, thus securing his protection and the safety of the defending troops. Also among the spoils was Gobomaru (御坊丸), the biological son of Oda Nobunaga, adopted son of Kageto, who was then seven years old. Nobutomo sent him to Kai Province as a hostage; the boy would later become known as Oda Katsunaga. With the fulfillment of treaty stipulations, Nobutomo made Iwamura Castle his headquarters and a front-line defensive position from which he could support the Takeda.

== Death ==
After the death of Takeda Shingen in the spring of 1573, Nobutomo continued to support Shingen's son, Takeda Katsuyori, in the prosecution of his campaigns.

In 1575, Katsuyori lost the Battle of Nagashino, a disaster for the Takeda clan which left Nobutomo at Iwamura Castle without support. Under repeated siege by Oda Nobutada, the forces under Nobutomo managed to hold the castle until November when Nobunaga swept in with the main army. Nobutomo signed a truce to surrender the castle after realizing that he had no chance to hold out any longer. However, Nobunaga broke the truce and ordered Nobutomo, his wife (Nobunaga's aunt), and the troops of the castle garrison to be executed.

On December 28, 1575, Nobutomo was crucified upside down on the banks of the Nagara River along with his wife Otsuya no Kata, and his elder retainers Oshima Nagatoshi and Zakouji Sadafusa on the banks. (Note: November 26 according to Nobunaga Koki chronicle.)

His domain holdings in Shinano passed to his eldest son Akiyama Katsuhisa.

== Cultural references ==
The main character in the book, The Samurai's Tale, by Erik Christian Haugaard served under Akiyama Nobutomo.
