= Nishikawa Castle =

Japanese castle from the Sengoku period

- (西川城)
- Toyohashi, Aichi Prefecture, Japan
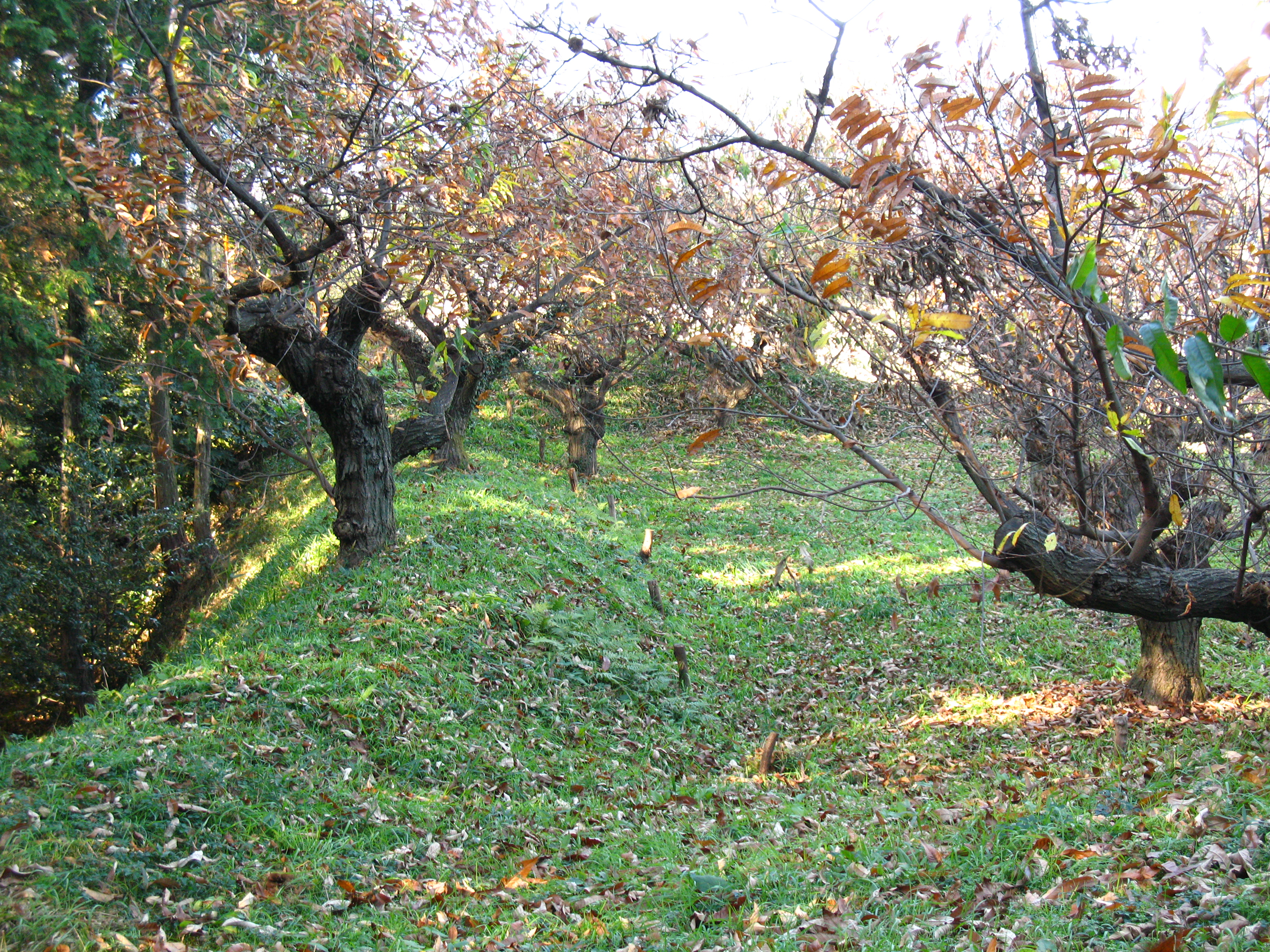
- View of one corner of the main courtyard of Nishikawa Castle. Earthen ramparts visible. The trees are part of the chestnut orchard.

Site information
- Type: Hill-on-Plains castle (平山城)
- Open to the public: yes
- Condition: Main courtyard accessible; portions are either undeveloped forest or cultivated orchard.

Location
- Location of Nishikawa Castle site
- Location within Japan
- Coordinates: 34.839238°N 137.456367°E

Site history
- Built: 1532–1555
- Built by: Saigo Kiyokazu
- In use: ca.1555–1661

Nishikawa Castle (西川城, Nishikawa-jō) was a branch castle of the Saigo Clan in the Mikawa region during the Age of Warring States in Japan. The name Nishikawa means "west river" in Japanese.

There are no extant structures on the site of the castle, though alterations to the topography, such as earthen ramparts and a dry moat, are readily apparent and an explanatory signboard is posted by the trail leading up to the main courtyard. Nishikawa Castle site is located in Ishimaki-Nishikawa-cho, Toyohashi in Aichi Prefecture.

== Background ==
In 1526, the Mikawa-Saigo family suffered defeat when Yamanaka Castle was stormed by the forces of Matsudaira Kiyoyasu. After four generations of conflict between the Saigo and Matsudaira families, the Saigo were forced to surrender and give up control of northern Mikawa Province; they became loyal vassals of the Matsudaira, their samurai forces ready to fight for their one-time enemy. Although a measure of stability was probably brought to the region, it was still something of a wilderness and at a crossroads for several feuding factions that would be the scene of important battles in the decades to come. A castle in the area would have been an outpost and rallying point to guard against incursions by the Oda, Takeda, or other clans. According to the Mikawa Chorography, a scholarly survey of the region written in 1740, Nishikawa Castle was built to confront the threat of the rival Makino clan, which occupied the adjoining region in what is now the town of Toyokawa.

== History ==
Nishikawa Castle was built sometime between 1532 and 1555 (the Tenbun Period) by Saigo Kiyokazu, and served as a branch castle of the Saigo clan, while the main residence and clan headquarters was at Wachigaya Castle. As an apparent show of loyalty to the Imagawa clan, the dominant ally of the Matsudaira, the name "Nishikawa" was created as an amalgamation of the first kanji from Saigo (西, which can be pronounced nishi, sei, or sai) and the second kanji of Imagawa (川, pronounced kawa or gawa).

Open conflict between the Saigo and the Makino never occurred. Their mutual allegiance to the Matsudaira clan, their participation in conflicts led by Tokugawa Ieyasu, and the pressure of external enemies may have diverted enough resources so that a hostile peace could be maintained. Although Nishikawa Castle was never attacked, it did serve as a forward command position and staging point for Saigo troops on the advent of at least two battles. In 1571, Takeda forces led by Akiyama Nobutomo led an incursion into the area and were driven back by the Saigo, led by Saigo Yoshikatsu and troops from Nishikawa Castle, at the Battle of Takehiro.

In 1575, an army under Takeda Katsuyori laid siege to Nagashino Castle in northern Mikawa. An ashigaru soldier named Torii Suneemon crossed the lines of the besieging force to inform Tokugawa Ieyasu at Okazaki Castle. Suneemon would later die for his loyalty and become a popular hero. A legend among the Saigo family asserts that during his mission, Suneemon stopped at Nishikawa Castle for a short rest before pressing on to Okazaki; however, this is not corroborated by other sources. Whether or not the Saigo were informed of the situation in advance, it is known that a combined Oda-Tokugawa army advanced into the area to meet the invading force. Troops of the Saigo clan gathered at Nishikawa Castle and issued forth to join the Tokugawa army for the decisive Battle of Nagashino.

Following the Siege of Odawara Castle in 1590, in which Tokugawa Ieyasu and Toyotomi Hideyoshi defeated the rival Hōjō clan of the east, Hideyoshi offered the newly acquired Kantō region to Ieyasu in exchange for his five domains, which included Mikawa. Ieyasu accepted the offer, and the Saigo clan accompanied him in his transfer to the east. The lord of Nishikawa Castle, Saigo Iekazu (son of Kiyokazu), was ordered to relocate to Oyumi Castle, in Shimōsa Province (incidentally, the Makino clan was ordered to a province to the northwest in the same year). Custody of Nishikawa Castle and its surrounding lands was passed from the Saigo to the Ogasawara clan, but with the re-distribution of clans, Mikawa province was surrounded by vassals of Toyotomi Hideyoshi, and so Nishikawa Castle ceased to be a priority military structure. In 1661, Ogasawara Naga'aki, who was responsible for administering the region, was promoted to lordship over Yoshida Castle, and Nishikawa Castle was thereafter abandoned. As with many abandoned castles, local peasantry probably plundered the site for building materials such as stones and lumber.

=== Lady Saigo ===
In 1562, Tozuka Masako was born at Nishikawa Castle. Her mother was the elder sister of Saigo Kiyokazu, and in time Saigo would adopt his niece, who spent her childhood at Nishikawa Castle and would eventually become known as Saigō-no-Tsubone (西郷の局) or "Lady Saigō". Also known affectionately by her nickname Oai (お愛, "Love"), Lady Saigo was the first consort of Tokugawa Ieyasu, and the most beloved of all his wives and concubines.

Lady Saigo would bear two sons by Ieyasu: Tokugawa Hidetada (1579–1632) and Matsudaira Tadayoshi (1580–1607). Hidetada would be the second shōgun of the new Tokugawa bakufu, and led the nation from 1605 until his retirement in 1623. Lady Saigo died on July 1, 1589, at Sunpu Castle, aged 37 years. The cause of her early death was never determined. While murder was suspected at the time, and poison has been theorized as the mode, no culprit was ever identified.

== Castle design ==
Nishikawa Castle was built on top of a modified natural hill. The top of the hill was levelled for use as the main courtyard (本曲輪 hon-kuruwa) at a height of 20 meters above ground level. Thus, among Japanese castles, Nishikawa is classified as a "hill-on-plains castle" (平山城). Earthen ramparts were constructed and encircle the courtyard, a dry moat was cut, and a sloping trail around the hill provides access between the courtyard and ground level. The main keep was located on top of the hill and would have overlooked smaller satellite courtyards; one was on a terraced portion of the hill, others were at ground level. The design of Nishikawa Castle therefore conformed with the classic motte-and-bailey design of many European castles, and as it served as the headquarters and residence of a local samurai lord from the Mikawa branch of the Saigo family, Nishikawa Castle met all criteria of an actual castle.

== Present state ==
The existing site of Nishikawa Castle is mainly composed of the hilltop courtyard where the castle keep once stood. Visitors can park at the Daifuku Temple (大福寺), which is located next to the castle site, or along the shoulder of the road. An explanatory signboard marks the beginning of the sloping grass-covered path which leads around the hill to the top. Features like the dry moat, earthen ramparts, and the earthen foundation for a turret (yagura) are still discernible. Part of the hilltop is covered by a naturally growing stand of Japanese cedar trees, while a cultivated orchard of chestnut trees grows on the rest of the level hilltop. The castle site has also become known to locals for the abundance of dogtooth violets that grow there.

The site of Nishikawa Castle is located along Route 499 in the northern countryside of Toyohashi in Aichi Prefecture, near the border with Toyokawa. Daifuku Temple (大福寺) stands next to the castle site, which is marked Shiroyama (城山) or "Castle Mountain" on some maps.
