= Siege of Kanie =

Second Siege of Kanie
- Part of the Sengoku period
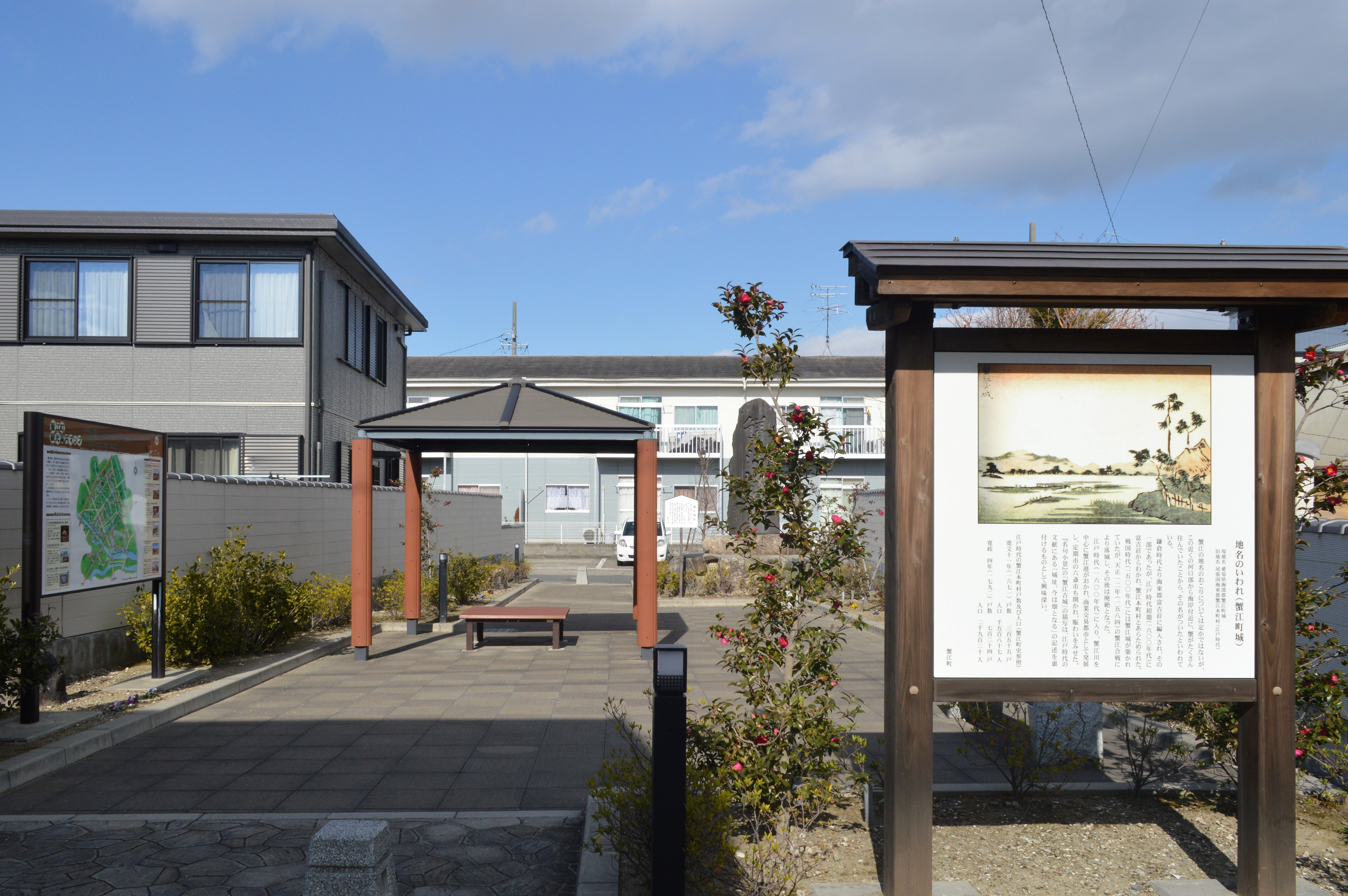
Date	April – June 23, 1584
Location	Kanie castle, Owari Province, Japan
Result	Oda-Tokugawa victory
Territorial changes	Castle taken by Toyotomi forces, later retaken by Oda-Tokugawa forces

Belligerents
forces of Toyotomi Hideyoshi	forces loyal to Oda clan and Tokugawa clan

Commanders and leaders
Takigawa Kazumasu; Kuki Yoshitaka; Gamō Ujisato; Maeda Tanetoshi (executed) (Second siege)	Maeda Tanetoshi (surrendered) (First siege); Oda Nagamasu; Tokugawa Ieyasu; Sakakibara Yasumasa; Sakai Tadatsugu; Mizuno Katsunari

The 1584 siege of Kanie was one of many elements in Toyotomi Hideyoshi's campaign to consolidate his power over the lands held by the Oda clan in Owari province, Japan. This event actually consisted of two sieges.

== First Siege ==
When Hideyoshi forces came to attack Kanie castle, it was held by Maeda Tanetoshi on behalf of the Oda. However, Hideyoshi had pardoned Tanetoshi's cousin, Takigawa Kazumasu, for his support of Shibata Katsuie at Battle of Shizugatake, and as a result Kazumasu was an ally of Hideyoshi. Kazumasu negotiate and convinced his cousin, Tanetoshi, to switch sides joining Hideyoshi and giving up the castle to him.

Later, Kazumasu and Tanetoshi then attempted to attack Oda's, nearby Ono castle, but they were repulsed by Oda Nagamasu, when the Oda defenders threw torches into the attackers' boats.

== Second Siege ==
After the Battle of Nagakute in April, the front line in northern Owari reached stalemate. At this time, Kanie Castle was located about three miles between Ieyasu's Kiyosu Castle and Nobuo's Nagashima Castle, and was connected to the Mie moat and three castles: Ono Castle, Shimoichiba Castle, and Maeda Castle. At that time, Kanie castle were facing the sea and was one of the leading ports in Owari, along with Atsuta and Tsushima. Then in June 18, Ieyasu and Nobuo led 20,000 soldiers and besieged three castles: Kanie Castle, Maeda Castle, and Shimoichiba Castle. The Kanie castle were defended by Maeda Nagatane and Takigawa Kazumasu. Meanwhile, the Oda-Tokugawa army were led by Sakai Tadatsugu, Okanabe Mori, and Yamaguchi Shigemasa spearheading the attack towards Shimoichiba castle, while Sakakibara Yasumasa, Osuga Yasutaka were deployed to capture any fleeing defenders.

Tanetoshi and Kazumasu withdraw from Ono castle and returning to Kanie castle. However, they came under siege from forces loyal to Oda Nobukatsu and Sakakibara clan. The port of Kanie also blockaded as the Hatamoto officers of Tokugawa such as Mizuno Katsunari, who also hijacked two ships belonged to Kuki Yoshitaka.

On June 22, Oda Nobuo and Tokugawa Ieyasu launch an all-out attack on Kanie Castle. The soldiers led by Tadatsugu, who has been deployed at the major entrance, were exhausted after days of fierce fighting, and in the evening, the soldiers of Yasumasa Sakakibara and Ietada Matsudaira entered Kaimonjiguchi in their place.

The Oda troops and their allies led by Oda Nagamasu, broke through the outer defenses of Kanie castle, and negotiated that they retaken the castle and would not continue the attack on the condition that they gave Maeda Tanetoshi head. On June 23, Ieyasu entered the castle with Sakakibara Yasumasa, thus the castle were subdued.

Later, when Maeda Tanetoshi attempted to escape, he was killed by his cousin, Takigawa Kazumasu, who provided Tanetoshi head to the Oda commanders.

== Sources ==
- Hirai, Takato (1992), 福山開祖・水野勝成 [Mizuno Katsunari the founder of Fukuyama], 新人物往来社 / Shin Jinbutsu Ōraisha, ISBN 4404019181, OCLC 28019953
