= Oda Nagamasa =

Japanese daimyō

1st Daimyō of Kaiju-Shibamura
- In office 1615–1659
- Succeeded by: Oda Nagasada

Head of Oda clan
- In office 1630–1670
- Preceded by: Oda Nobukatsu
- Succeeded by: Oda Nobuhisa

Personal details
- Born: 1587
- Died: April 7, 1670 (aged 82–83)
- Parent: Oda Nagamasu (father)

Military service
- Battles/wars: Siege of Osaka

Oda Nagamasa (織田長政) (1587 – April 7, 1670) was a Japanese daimyō of the early Edo period, who ruled the Kaiju-Shibamura Domain.

== Family ==
Nagamasa was the nephew of Oda Nobunaga, and was born in 1587, the fourth son of Nobunaga's younger brother Nagamasu.

In his early years, Nagamasa became a page to Tokugawa Ieyasu, and received a stipend of 3,000 koku. In 1605, he received junior 5th rank, lower grade (ju-goi no ge) and the title of Tango no kami, though his title later changed to Saemonza.

Following the Siege of Osaka in 1615, Oda Nagamasu divided up his landholdings in Yamato and Settsu Provinces, granting Nagamasa territory worth 10,000 koku. Nagamasa set up his residence at Yamaguchi village in Yamato Province, and soon after moved it to Kaijū village, from which he took the domain's name (later changed yet again, to Shibamura). At the same time, his younger brother Hisanaga received 10,000 koku, and founded the Yanagimoto Domain.

Nagamasa ruled Kaijū until his retirement in late 1659, when he yielded headship to his eldest son Nagasada. After retirement, Nagamasa took the style Bokusai (ト斎). He died at age 84, on April 7, 1670.

== Family ==
- Father: Oda Nagamasu (1548–1622)
- Brother: Oda Hisanaga

Preceded by none	1st Daimyō of Kaiju-Shibamura; 1615–1659	Succeeded by Oda Nagasada
