= Iwamura Castle =

- Japanese: 岩村城
- Iwamura, Gifu Prefecture, Japan
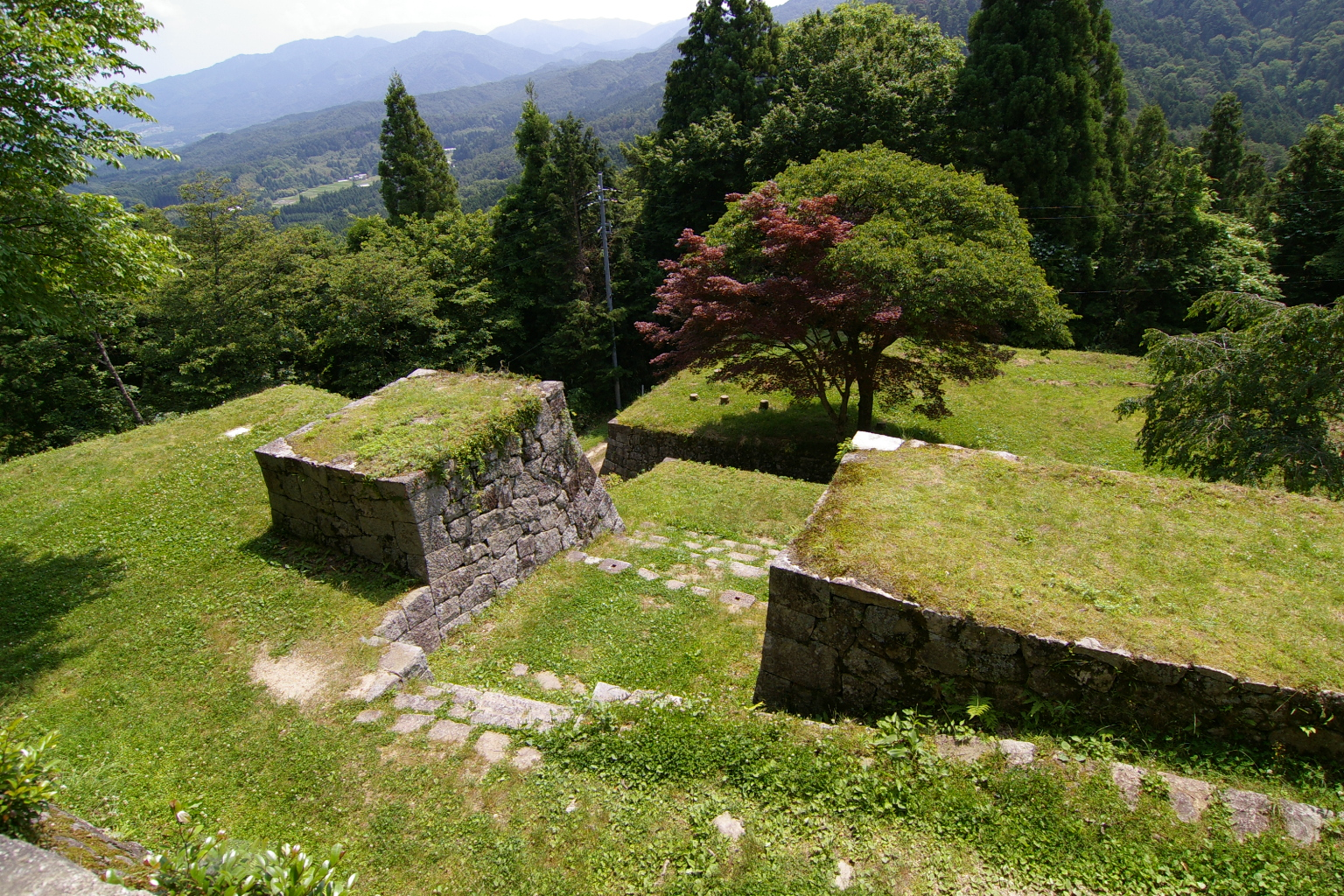
- Castle ruins

Site information
- Type: Mountaintop castle

Location
- Coordinates: 35°21′36″N 137°27′04″E

Site history
- Built: 1185
- Demolished: 1871

Garrison information
- Occupants: Tōyama clan, Mori clan, Matsudaira clan, Niwa clan

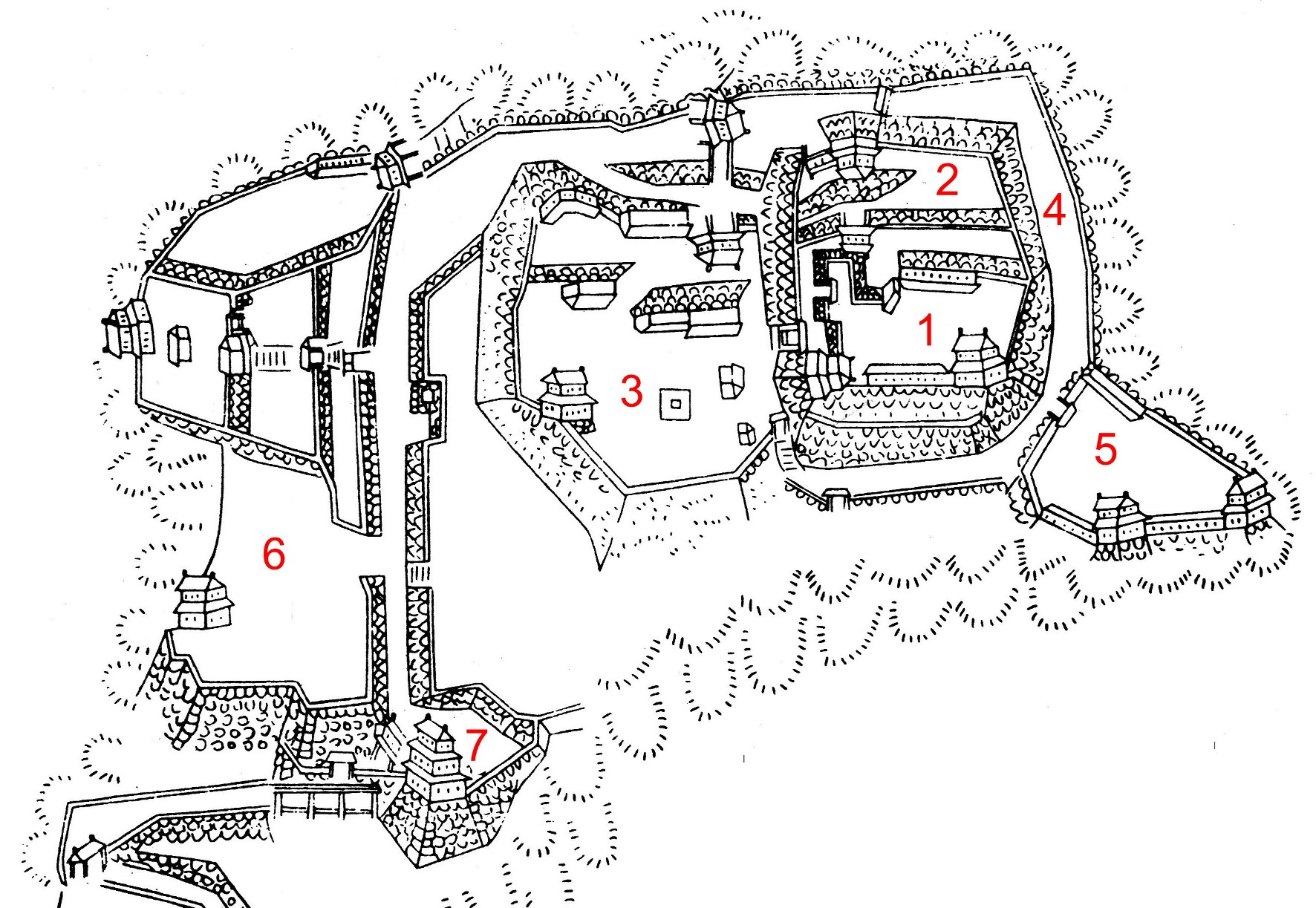
Edo period layout

Iwamura Castle (岩村城, Iwamura-jō) was located in the southeastern area of Mino Province in Japan. Its ruins can be found in the modern-day municipal subdivision of Iwamura, in Ena, Gifu Prefecture. Along with Takatori Castle in Nara and Bitchu-Matsuyama Castle in Okayama, it is regarded as one of the three best mountain castles, and at an elevation of 721 meters above sea level (200 meters above its immediate surroundings), it is one of the highest in Japan.

== History ==
Iwamura Castle is situated on a steep mountain overlooking the Iwamura Basin. The area commands an intersection of the Sanshu Kaidō, which connected southern Shinano Province with central Mikawa Province and the Pacific Coast, and the road connecting Mikawa Province with Tōtōmi Province to the east. In the Sengoku period, this area was of great strategic interest to both Takeda Shingen and Oda Nobunaga.

During the Kamakura period, eastern Mino was held by Kato Kagekado a vassal of Minamoto no Yoritomo. His descendants formed cadet branches named after their residence, and through the Muromachi period, Iwamura was ruled by the Tōyama clan. The Tōyama were never a very strong clan, and were forced to pledge fealty to whichever of their neighbors was more powerful at the time. In 1545, they were subordinate to the Takeda clan. However, Oda Nobunaga was eager to build a relationship with the Tōyama, primarily as they bordered the lands of his arch-nemesis, Saitō Dōsan of Gifu. To this end, Nobunaga sent his aunt, Otsuya-no-kata, to marry Tōyama Kagetō. As the couple did not produce an heir, Nobunaga further sent his sixth son, Oda Katsunaga to be adopted into the clan.

In 1565, Nobunaga began his campaign against eastern Mino in earnest. At first, he maintained an agreement with Takeda Shingen that the Takeda would be allowed to conquer Suruga Province, but in return, Nobunaga would have a free hand to the west. In 1572, after Shingen conquered Suruga, he turned his attention against Nobunaga. Shingen sent his general Akiyama Nobutomo (also known as Akiyama Torashige) against Iwamura. In the Siege of Iwamura, the Tōyama initially drove the attackers off, but with great losses, including that of Tōyama Kagetō, who died of injuries sustained in the attack. His widow, Otsuya-no-kata, assumed command and held out for several more months, before reaching a surrender agreement. Per this treaty, her adopted son (Oda Katsunaga) was sent to Kai Province as a hostage, and she was compelled to marry Akiyama Nobutomo. The remaining Tōyama forces joined the Takeda, a move which enraged Oda Nobunaga, who attacked Iwamura Castle on repeated occasions. In 1575, following the decisive defeat of Takeda Katsuyori at the Battle of Nagashino, Oda forces surrounded Iwamura Castle, but it continued to hold out. After six months of siege and battle, Otsuya-no-kata responded to a call for negotiations. However Nobunaga reneged on his word and had Otsuya-no-kata and Akiyama Nobutomo crucified as traitors on 23 December 1575. The remaining defenders within the castle were all slaughtered and theIwamura branch of the Tōyama clan was extinguished.

In 1582 Oda Nobunaga began his conquest of Kai Province, staying at Iwamura Castle to receive reports of the results of the war. Afterwards, the castle was given to Mori Nagayoshi and then to his son Mori Tadamasa. During the 17 years that the Mori controlled the castle, they transformed it with stone walls into its current configuration. After the death of Toyotomi Hideyoshi, the castle was given to Tamura Naomasa. However, the Tamura supported the Western Army at the Battle of Sekigahara and was dispossessed. The castle was given to Matsudaira Ienori, of the Ogyū-Matsudaira, who were made daimyō of the newly created Iwamura Domain. They were replaced by the Niwa clan from 1638 to 1702, and finally by the Ishikawa clan from 1702 until the Meiji restoration.

Subsequent to Meiji revolution, all of the remaining buildings of the castle were demolished in 1873, with the exception of one gate which was moved to a neighboring temple. All that remains at present are some remnants of stone walls on the mountain. The site is a 20-minute walk to hillside entrance from the Akechi Railway Iwamura Station, followed by another 30 minutes from hillside entrance to the central area.

== See also ==
- Siege of Iwamura

== Literature ==
- De Lange, William (2021). An Encyclopedia of Japanese Castles. Groningen: Toyo Press. pp. 600 pages. ISBN 978-9492722300.
- Schmorleitz, Morton S. (1974). Castles in Japan. Tokyo: Charles E. Tuttle Co. pp. 144–145. ISBN 0-8048-1102-4.
- Motoo, Hinago (1986). Japanese Castles. Tokyo: Kodansha. ISBN 0-87011-766-1.
- Mitchelhill, Jennifer (2004). Castles of the Samurai: Power and Beauty. Tokyo: Kodansha. ISBN 4-7700-2954-3.
- Turnbull, Stephen (2003). Japanese Castles 1540–1640. Osprey Publishing. ISBN 1-84176-429-9.
