= Lady Otsuya =

Japanese female samurai

Otsuya no Kata おつやの方

Castellan of Iwamura castle (De facto Toyama clan head)
- Incumbent
- Assumed office 1572
- Preceded by: Tōyama Kagetō

Personal details
- Died: December 1575
- Spouse(s): Tōyama Kagetō; Akiyama Nobutomo
- Relatives: Oda Nobunaga (nephew); Oichi (niece)

Military service
- Allegiance: Oda clan Takeda clan
- Unit: Toyama clan
- Battles/wars: Siege of Iwamura castle

Lady Otsuya (おつやの方 Otsuya no Kata) was a Japanese female samurai (onna-musha) from the Sengoku period. She was a daughter of the Oda clan and served as ruler of Iwamura Castle until the last days of her life.

Otsuya is best known as the aunt of Oda Nobunaga, and was also the wife of Hibino Kiyozane and Tōyama Kagetō, and a foster mother to Oda Katsunaga. Her execution under Nobunaga may have been a major factor in the decline in Nobunaga's reputation, who would later be murdered by Akechi Mitsuhide and other traitors in the Incident of Honnoji.

== Life ==
Otsuya no Kata was born as the daughter of Oda Nobutada, a military commander in Owari Province. She married Hibino Kiyozane, a vassal of the Saito clan in Mino Province and one of the Saito Six Elders. However, in the Battle of Moribe in 1561, her nephew Oda Nobunaga attacked her castle, Yuki. Kiyozane was slain in this battle.

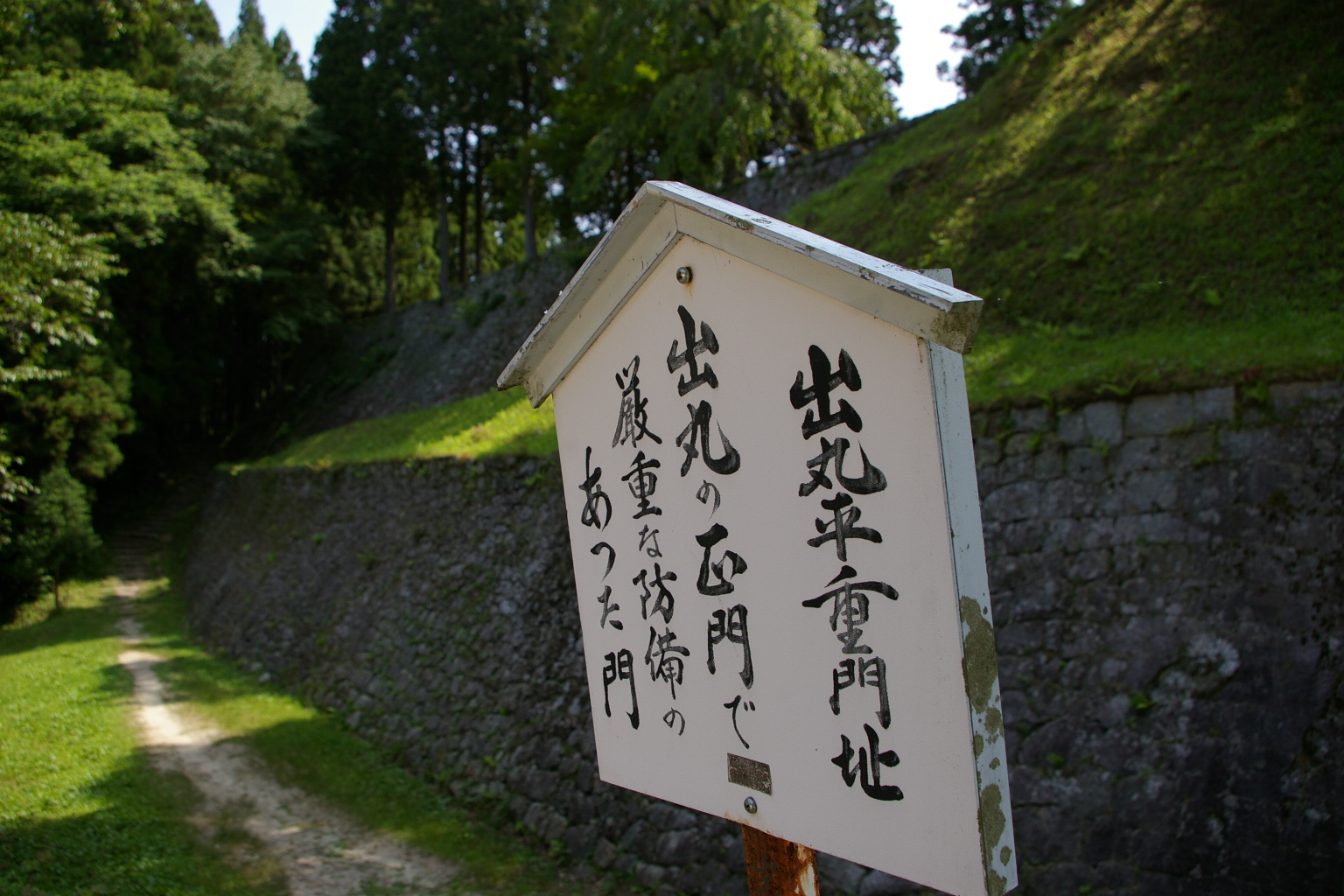
Remains of Iwamura Castle

On January 25, 1573, the Battle of Mikatagahara took place, On March 15, 800 soldiers led by Baba Nobuharu, who were attacking Iwamura Castle, attacked the Oda Army and Oda Nobunaga mobilized 10,000 soldiers. When Nobunaga learned that the soldiers at Iwamura's castle, led by his aunt, had attacked the troops of the Oda clan, he decided to counterattack.

In 1575 when Oda army defeated the army of Shingen's son, Takeda Katsuyori, in the Battle of Nagashino, Oda Nobutada and others surrounded Iwamura castle. Oda Nobunaga decided to attack and take his aunt's castle, but she defended it against Oda's fierce assault for a half a year. After six months of battle, she left the castle to respond to Oda's false plea for peace. However, Nobunaga reneged on his word and had Otsuya and Nobutomo crucified as traitors on December 23, 1575. The rest of the castle defenders were also massacred or burned alive.

== Legacy ==
Representative from Ena City Board of Educational and Cultural Affairs Division has stated that Lady Otsuya has become a basis of popular legend as "female daimyo" who possessing "unmatched beauty." and was also "aunt of Nobunaga" in many novels and anecdotes of the era following Sengoku period. This legend was inspiring many literature works or fictional novels. However, this legend of a female castle lord has no historical sources and no basis, as it only appeared through anecdotes from the later era such as Kōyō Gunkan or Iwamura Fushi.

Since 1992, the residents living close to Iwamura, Ena City, Gifu Prefecture, have hung a short (split) curtain hung at the entrance of a room indicating the names of female members of each family to the memory of Otsuya no Kata, who was the castellan of the area.

== See also ==
- List of female castellans in Japan
