= Aya Murakami (investor) =

Japanese investor

- Born: 1988 (age 37–38)
- Education: Keio University
- Occupation: Investor

Aya Murakami (村上 絢, Murakami Aya; born 1988) is a Japanese investor. She is the CEO of C&I Holdings (since 2015) and was also the representative director of the Murakami Family Foundation (村上財団) from 2016 to 2022.

== Early life ==
Murakami was born in 1988, the elder daughter of Yoshiaki Murakami. After graduating from Keio University, Faculty of Law, Department of Political Science, she joined Morgan Stanley MUFG Securities.

== Career ==
In June 2015, Murakami was appointed CEO of C&I Holdings. By August, she was also appointed the representative director of the NPO Charity Platform. On November 25, 2015, her home was forcibly investigated by the Securities and Exchange Surveillance Commission on suspicion of violating the Financial Instruments and Exchange Act (market manipulation). In August 2016, she became the representative director of the Murakami Family Foundation, a non-profit organization established by her father, Yoshiaki Murakami. In September 2017, BuzzFeed News published her first parent-child interview with her father, Yoshiaki Murakami.

In April 2018, the Securities and Exchange Surveillance Commission, which had compulsorily investigated Murakami's home in 2015, deferred indicting her on charges of violating the Financial Instruments and Exchange Act (market manipulation). In May 2018, she appeared as a panelist at the Milken Conference, the largest international economic conference in the United States, held in Los Angeles, and raised the issue of internal reserves that Japan is facing. In January 2022, Murakami stepped down as representative director of the Murakami Family Foundation. She was succeeded by her younger sister Rei Murakami Frenzel.

== Personal life ==
Her company's philosophy is to realize corporate governance, and in order to provide advice from a medium to long-term perspective, C&I Holdings has stated that all of its operating funds are its own assets. Murakami has two children.
