= The Samurai's Tale =

1984 novel by Erik Christian Haugaard

- Author: Erik Christian Haugaard
- Language: English
- Genre: Historical fiction novel
- Publisher: Houghton Mifflin
- Publication date: 1984
- Media type: Print (paperback)
- OCLC: 61410869

The Samurai's Tale, by Erik Christian Haugaard, is a fiction novel published by Houghton Mifflin Company in 1984.

The novel is about a boy named Taro, originally named Murakami. He loses his parents when he is young and is then captured by Takeda Shingen, eventually becoming a servant of one of his generals, Lord Akiyama. Eventually, Shingen dies, and his son - Takeda Katsuyori - takes over his father's realm. Meanwhile, Taro has become a samurai, received a new name, and fought with a man named Lord Akiyama, who proves to be an able commander by taking over Iwamura castle from to Toyama's. He also falls in love with Aki-hime, the daughter of Lord Zakoji. Katsuyori proves to be incompetent, ignores advice from the retainers of his father, and shuns lord Akiyama, whose castle is eventually overrun by Oda Nobunaga. Katsuyori is defeated at Nagashino in 1575.
