= Yanagimoto Domain =

Feudal domain of Japan, 1615–1871

Yanagimoto Domain 柳本藩
- Domain of Japan
- 1615–1871
- Mon of the Oda clan
- Capital: Yanagimoto jin'ya
- Area
  - Coordinates: 34°33′35.73″N 135°50′35.21″E
  - Type: Daimyō
- Historical era: Edo period
  - Established: 1615
  - Disestablished: 1871
- Today part of: Nara Prefecture

Location of Yanagimoto jin'ya
Yanagimoto Domain (Japan)

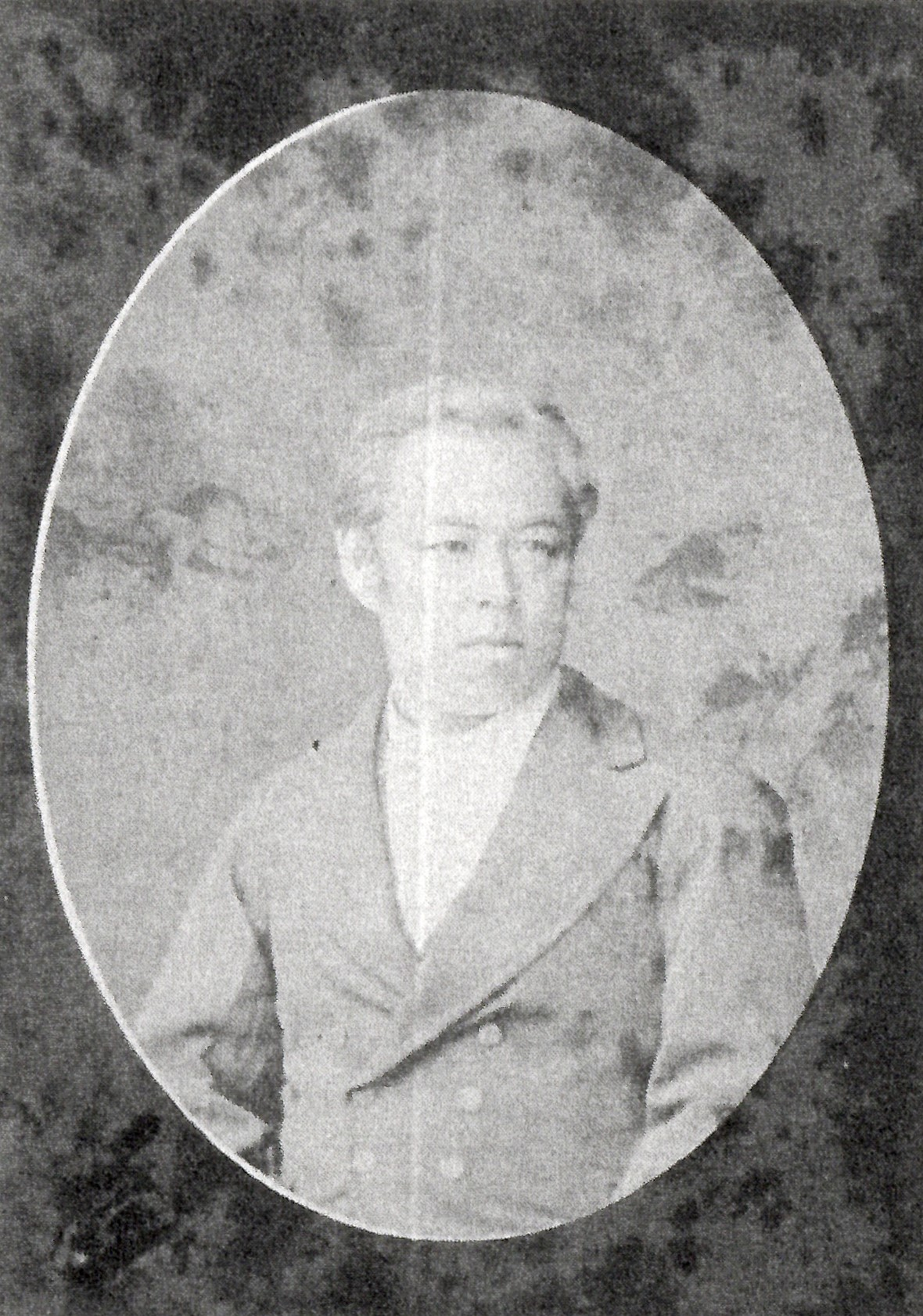
Oda Nobushige, next to last daimyo of Yanagimoto Domain

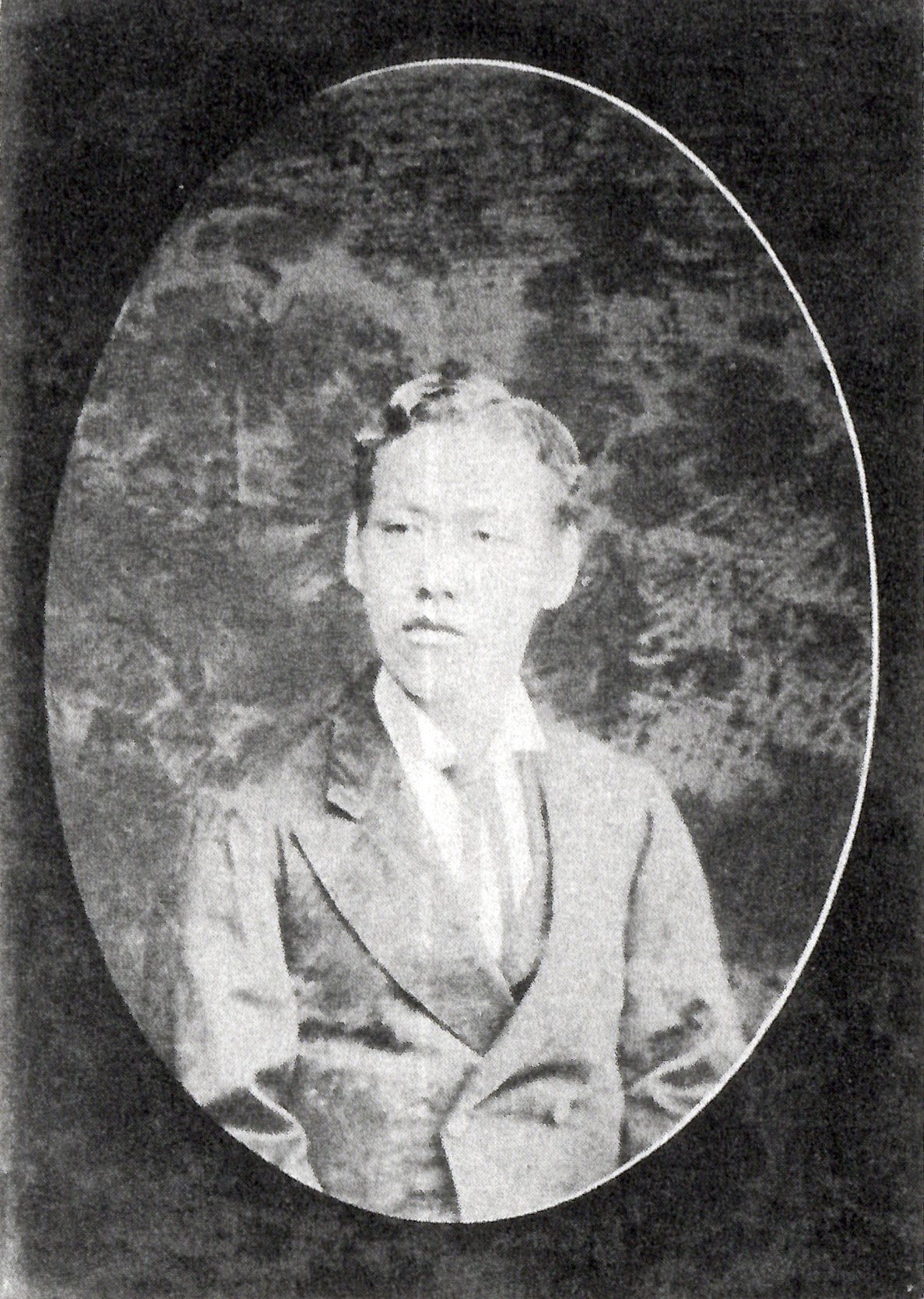
Oda Nobuhiro, final daimyo of Yanagimoto Domain

Yanagimoto Domain (柳本藩, Yanagimoto-han) was a feudal domain under the Tokugawa shogunate of Edo period Japan, in what is now central Nara Prefecture. It was centered around Yanagimoto jin'ya in what is now the city of Tenri, Nara and was ruled by the tozama daimyō Oda clan for all of its history. Although the domain office was a jin'ya, the daimyō was accorded the status of a "castle-holding daimyō" due to the history of the Oda clan.

== History ==
Oda Nagamasu (Yuraku), the younger brother of Oda Nobunaga and famous as a tea master, fought against the Eastern Army at the Battle of Sekigahara in 1600 and achieved great military success. He was given a fief of with a kokudaka of 30,000 koku in Yamato and Kawachi Provinces. He did not serve Tokugawa Ieyasu, but was a vassal of Hideyori as he was the great-uncle of Toyotomi Hideyori. He fought on the Toyotomi side during the Winter Siege of Osaka, but behind the scenes he liaised with the Tokugawa shogunate and worked behind the scenes during peace negotiations during the winter siege. Since he left the Toyotomi side just before the Osaka summer campaign, he was not charged with any crime after the war. However, out of his domain's 30,000 koku, Oda Nagamasa retained 10,000 koku as his own retirement allowance and of the divided the remainder, with 10,000 koku given to his fourth son Oda Nagamasa, and 10,000 koku to fifth son, Oda Naonaga. Therefore, Nagamasa's lineage continued as Shibamura Domain in Yamato Province, and Hisamasa lineage continued as Yanagimoto Domain.

In February 1709, the fourth daimyō, Oda Hidechika, was murdered by fellow daimyō Maeda Toshimasa (with whom he had a long history of bad relations) during a memorial service being held for at Kan'ei-ji in Edo for the former shogun, Tokugawa Tsunayoshi. As he had no heir, Yanagimoto Domain faced the possibility of attainder, but the chief retainers were quickly reported that Oda Hidechika died of illness and his younger brother Oda Narizumi had been adopted as heir.

Around the middle of the Edo period, the financial difficulties of the domain became increasingly apparent. For this reason, heavy taxes were imposed, but in January 1769, during the tenure of the 10th daimyō, Oda Hidewata, the peasants filed a strong protest against the heavy taxation. In December 1802, a revolt broke out by peasants demanding a reduction in annual tax, and many people were killed and injured in the scuffles between the Oda samurai and the peasants. Furthermore, in the latter half of the Edo period, the Yanagimoto residence was completely destroyed by fire in 1830, when the domain's finances were already in dire straits. For this reason, the 11th daimyō, Oda Nobuaki, was forced to lay off 27 retainers in October 1833. On December 27, 1852, he was elevated in is status to that of a "castle-holding daimyō, the first member of his famous clan to recover this title since Nobunaga. In the Bakumatsu period, he was involved in suppressing the Tenchūgumi incident and repairing the Emperor Jimmu's tomb in accordance with the wishes of Emperor Kōmei. From an early stage, the domain was a supporter of the Meiji restoration. In 1871, Yanagimoto Domain was abolished with the abolition of the han system and incorporated into "Yanagimoto Prefecture", and then into Nara Prefecture.

== Holdings at the end of the Edo period ==
As with most domains in the han system, Yanagimoto Domain consisted of several discontinuous territories calculated to provide the assigned kokudaka, based on periodic cadastral surveys and projected agricultural yields.

- Yamato Province
  - 24 villages in Shikijō District
  - 2 villages in Uda District
  - 5 villages in Yamabe District

== List of daimyo ==
#	Name	Tenure	Courtesy title	Court Rank	kokudaka
Oda clan, 1615 - 1871(Tozama daimyo)
1	Oda Naonaga (織田尚長)	1615 - 1637	Yamato-no-kami (大和守)	Junior 5th Rank, Lower Grade (従五位下)	10,000 koku
2	Oda Nagatane (織田長種)	1637 - 1643	Shuri-no-suke (修理亮)	Junior 5th Rank, Lower Grade (従五位下)	10,000 koku
3	Oda Hidekazu (織田秀一)	1643 - 1687	Shinano-no-kami (信濃守)	Junior 5th Rank, Lower Grade (従五位下)	10,000 koku
4	Oda Hidechika (織田秀親)	1687 - 1709	-unknown-	Junior 5th Rank, Lower Grade (従五位下)	10,000 koku
5	Oda Naritoshi (Shigetoshi/Shigezumi) (織田成純)	1709 - 1724	Bungo-no-kami (豊後守)	Junior 5th Rank, Lower Grade (従五位下)	10,000 koku
6	Oda Hideyuki (織田秀行)	1724 - 1726	Iyo-no-kami (伊予守)	Junior 5th Rank, Lower Grade (従五位下)	10,000 koku
7	Oda Nobukata (織田信方)	1726 - 1741	Shimotsuke-no-kami (下野守)	Junior 5th Rank, Lower Grade (従五位下)	10,000 koku
8	Oda Hidekata (田秀賢)	1741 - 1763	Shinano-no-kami (信濃守)	Junior 5th Rank, Lower Grade (従五位下)	10,000 koku
9	Oda Nagatsune (織田長恒)	1763 - 1766	Chikuzen-no-kami (筑前守)	Junior 5th Rank, Lower Grade (従五位下)	10,000 koku
10	Oda Hidetsura (織田秀綿)	1766 - 1806	Yamato-no-kami (大和守)	Junior 5th Rank, Lower Grade (従五位下)	10,000 koku
11	Oda Nobuakira (織田信陽)	1806 - 1857	Aki-no-kami (安芸守)	Junior 5th Rank, Lower Grade (従五位下)	10,000 koku
12	Oda Nobushige (織田 信成)	1857 - 1868	Chikuzen-no-kami (筑前守)	Junior 5th Rank, Lower Grade (従五位下)	10,000 koku
13	Oda Nobuhiro (織田信及)	1868 - 1871	none -	Junior 5th Rank, Lower Grade (従五位下)	10,000 koku

== See also ==
- List of Han
- Tendo Domain
- Kaibara Domain
