= Murakami Station =

Murakami Station is the name of multiple train stations in Japan.

- Murakami Station (Chiba) in Chiba Prefecture
- Murakami Station (Niigata) in Niigata Prefecture
