= Erik Christian Haugaard =

- Born: April 13, 1923; Frederiksberg
- Died: June 4, 2009 (aged 86)
- Occupation: Novelist
