= List of castles in Japan =

This is an incomplete list of castles in Japan, and focuses on those with some historical notability. Five of Japan's castles (Hikone, Himeji, Inuyama, Matsue and Matsumoto) are National Treasures.

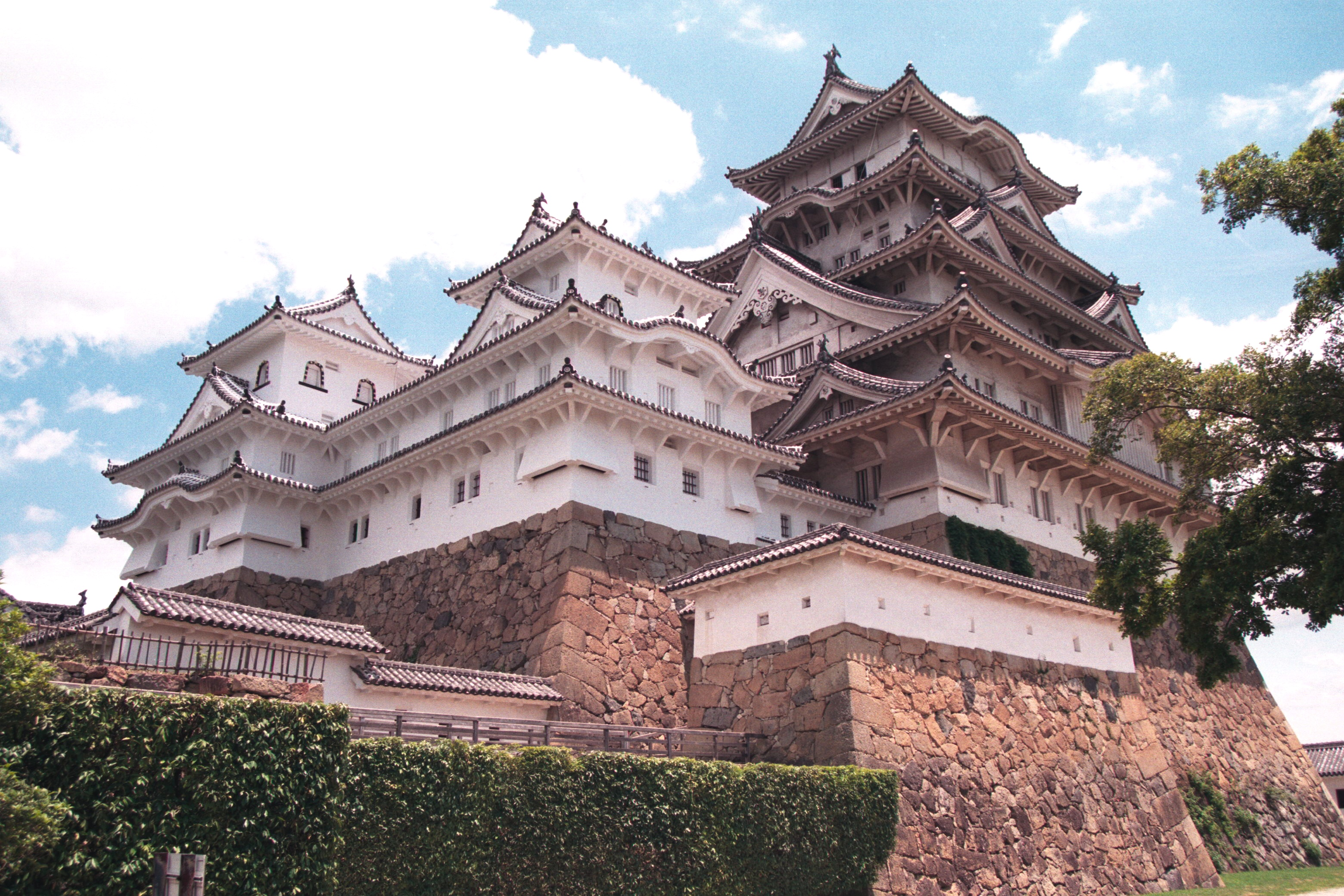
Himeji Castle (World Heritage Site)

== A ==
- Agena Castle, Uruma, Okinawa
- Aizuwakamatsu Castle (Tsuruga Castle), Aizuwakamatsu, Fukushima
- Akashi Castle, Akashi, Hyōgo
- Akō Castle, Akō, Hyōgo
- Amagasaki Castle, Amagasaki, Hyōgo
- Aoba Castle, Sendai, Miyagi
- Aya Castle, Aya, Miyazaki
- Azuchi Castle, Azuchi, Shiga (see Azuchi-Momoyama period)

== B ==
- Beru Castle, Amami, Kagoshima
- Bitchu Matsuyama Castle, Takahashi, Okayama
- Bitchu Takamatsu Castle, Okayama, Okayama

== C ==
- Chibana Castle, Okinawa, Okinawa
- Chihaya Castle, Chihayaakasaka, Osaka
- Chinen Castle, Chinen, Okinawa

== E ==
- Echizen-Fuchū Castle, Echizen, Fukui
- Echizen Ōno Castle, Ōno, Fukui
- Edo Castle (Imperial Palace), Tokyo (Tōkyo)

== F ==
- Fukuchiyama Castle, Fukuchiyama, Kyoto
- Fukui Castle, Fukui, Fukui
- Fukui Castle, Ibaraki, Osaka
- Fukuoka Castle, Fukuoka, Fukuoka
- Fukushima Castle, Fukushima, Fukushima
- Fukushima Castle, Kiso, Nagano
- Fukuyama Castle (Hisamatsu Castle), Fukuyama, Hiroshima
- Funai Castle, Ōita, Ōita
- Fushimi Castle (Momoyama Castle), Kyoto (see Azuchi-Momoyama period)

== G ==
- Gassantoda Castle, Yasugi, Shimane
- Gifu Castle (Inabayama Castle), Gifu, Gifu
- Goeku Castle, Okinawa, Okinawa
- Gujō Hachiman Castle, Gujō, Gifu
- Gushikawa Castle (Itoman), Itoman, Okinawa
- Gushikawa Castle (Kume), Kumejima, Okinawa

== H ==
- Hachigata Castle, Yorii, Saitama
- Hachinohe Castle, Hachinohe, Aomori
- Hachiōji Castle, Hachiōji, Tokyo
- Hadano Castle, Hadano, Kanagawa
- Hagi Castle, Hagi, Yamaguchi
- Hakumai Castle, Matsuzaka, Mie
- Hamamatsu Castle, Hamamatsu, Shizuoka
- Hara Castle, Minamishimabara, Nagasaki
- Hataya Castle, Yamanobe, Yamagata
- Hayashi Castle, Matsumoto, Nagano
- Hiji Castle (ruins), Hiji, Ōita
- Hikone Castle, Hikone, Shiga
- Himeji Castle, Himeji, Hyōgo, World Heritage Site
- Hinoe Castle, Minamishimabara, Nagasaki
- Hirado Castle, Hirado, Nagasaki
- Hirosaki Castle, Hirosaki, Aomori
- Hiroshima Castle, Hiroshima, Hiroshima
- Hoshizaki Castle, Nagoya, Aichi

== I ==
- Ichigoyama Castle, Yoshii, Gunma
- Ichijōdani Castle, Fukui, Fukui
- Iga Ueno Castle, Iga, Mie
- Iha Castle, Uruma, Okinawa
- Imabari Castle, Imabari, Ehime
- Ina Castle, Kozakai, Aichi
- Inohana Castle, Chiba, Chiba
- Inuyama Castle, Inuyama, Aichi
- Itami Castle, Itami, Hyōgo
- Iwabitsu Castle, Higashiagatsuma, Gunma
- Iwakuni Castle, Iwakuni, Yamaguchi
- Iwamura Castle, Ena, Gifu
- Iwasaki Castle, Nisshin, Aichi
- Iwayadō Castle, Ōshū, Iwate
- Izena Castle, Izena, Okinawa
- Izushi Castle, Izushi, Hyōgo

== K ==
- Kagoshima Castle, Kagoshima, Kagoshima
- Kakegawa Castle, Kakegawa, Shizuoka
- Kakunodate Castle, Kakunodate, Akita
- Kameyama Castle, Kameoka, Kyoto
- Kameyama Castle, Kameyama, Mie
- Kami-Akasaka Castle, Chihayaakasaka, Osaka
- Kamiizumi Castle, Yamanashi Prefecture
- Kaminokuni Castle, Kaminokuni, Hokkaido
- Kaminoyama Castle, Kaminoyama, Yamagata
- Kanayama Castle, Ōta, Gunma
- Kanazawa Castle, Kanazawa, Ishikawa
- Kannonji Castle, Azuchi, Shiga
- Kanō Castle, Gifu, Gifu
- Karakawa Castle, Goshogawara, Aomori
- Karasawa Castle, Sano, Tochigi
- Karatsu Castle, Karatsu, Saga
- Kasugayama Castle, Jōetsu, Niigata
- Katsuren Castle, Uruma, Okinawa
- Kawagoe Castle, Kawagoe, Saitama
- Kawate Castle, Gifu, Gifu
- Ki castle, Sōja, Okayama
- Kihara Castle, Inashiki District, Ibaraki
- Kikko Castle, Kagoshima, Kagoshima
- Kikuchi Castle, Kikuchi, Kumamoto
- Kishiwada Castle, Kishiwada, Osaka
- Kitanosho Castle, Fukui, Fukui
- Kitsuki Castle, Kitsuki, Ōita
- Kiyosu Castle, Kiyosu, Aichi
- Kōchi Castle, Kōchi, Kōchi
- Kōfu Castle, Kōfu, Yamanashi
- Kokura Castle, Kitakyushu, Fukuoka
- Komakiyama Castle, Komaki, Aichi
- Komine Castle (Shirakawa Castle), Shirakawa, Fukushima
- Komoro Castle, Komoro, Nagano
- Kōriyama Castle, Ibaraki, Osaka
- Kōriyama Castle, Shiwa, Iwate
- Kōriyama Castle, Yamatokōriyama, Nara
- Kōriyama Castle, Kagoshima Prefecture
- Kōriyama Castle, Kōriyama, Fukushima
- Kōriyama Castle, Ōnan, Shimane
- Kubota Castle, Akita, Akita
- Kumamoto Castle, Kumamoto, Kumamoto
- Kunimine Castle, Kanra, Gunma
- Kuniyoshi Castle, Mihama, Fukui
- Kurono Castle, Gifu, Gifu Prefecture
- Kurume Castle, Kurume, Fukuoka
- Kururi Castle, Kimitsu, Chiba
- Kushima Castle, Ōmura, Nagasaki
- Kuwabara Castle, Suwa, Nagano
- Kuwana Castle, Kuwana, Mie
- Katsurayama Castle, Susono, Shizuoka

== M ==
- Marugame Castle, Marugame, Kagawa
- Maruoka Castle, Maruoka, Fukui
- Matsue Castle, Matsue, Shimane
- Matsukura Castle, Takayama, Gifu
- Matsumae Castle, Matsumae, Hokkaido
- Matsumori Castle, Izumi, Miyagi
- Matsumoto Castle, Matsumoto, Nagano
- Matsushiro Castle, Nagano, Nagano
- Matsuyama Castle, Matsuyama, Ehime
- Matsuyama Castle, Takahashi, Okayama
- Matsuzaka Castle, Matsusaka, Mie
- Mihara Castle Mihara, Hiroshima
- Minakuchi Castle, Kōka, Shiga
- Minato Castle, Tsuchizaki, Akita, Akita
- Minowa Castle, Takasaki, Gunma
- Mito Castle, Mito, Ibaraki
- Mitsumine Castle, Sabae, Fukui
- Miyao Castle site, Miyajima, Hiroshima
- Mizusawa Castle, Oshu, Iwate
- Momoyama Castle, see Fushimi Castle
- Morioka Castle (Kozukata Castle), Morioka, Iwate
- Motegi Castle, Motegi, Tochigi
- Muro Castle, Toyohashi, Aichi

== N ==
- Nagahama Castle, Nagahama, Shiga
- Nagamori Castle, Gifu, Gifu Prefecture
- Nagaoka Castle, Nagaoka, Niigata
- Nagashino Castle, Shinshiro, Aichi
- Nagayama Castle, Hita, Ōita
- Nago Castle, Nago, Okinawa
- Nagoya Castle, Nagoya, Aichi
- Nagoya Castle, Karatsu, Saga
- Nagurumi Castle, Minakami, Gunma
- Nakagusuku Castle, Kitanakagusuku, Okinawa
- Nakatsu Castle, Nakatsu, Ōita
- Nakijin Castle, Nakijin, Okinawa
- Nanao Castle, Nanao, Ishikawa
- Nanzan Castle, Itoman, Okinawa
- Ne Castle, Hachinohe, Aomori
- Nedo Castle, Abiko, Chiba
- Negoya Castle, Otaki, Chiba
- Nihonmatsu Castle, Nihonmatsu, Fukushima
- Nijō Castle, Kyoto, World Heritage Site
- Nirayama Castle, Izunokuni, Shizuoka
- Nirengi Castle, Toyohashi, Aichi
- Nishikawa Castle, Toyohashi, Aichi
- Noda Castle, Aichi Prefecture

== O ==
- Obama Castle, Obama, Fukui Prefecture
- Obama Castle, Iwashiro, Fukushima Prefecture
- Obi Castle, Nichinan, Miyazaki
- Odani Castle, Kohoku, Shiga Prefecture
- Odawara Castle, Odawara, Kanagawa
- Ōgaki Castle, Ōgaki, Gifu
- Ōgo Castle, Ōgo, Gunma
- Ōtawara Castle, Ōtawara, Tochigi
- Ōita Castle, Ōita, Ōita
- Oka Castle (ja), Taketa, Ōita
- Okayama Castle, Okayama, Okayama
- Okazaki Castle, Okazaki, Aichi
- Omi Hachiman Castle, Ōmihachiman, Shiga
- Onomichi Castle, Onomichi, Hiroshima
- Osaka Castle, Osaka
- Oshi Castle, Gyōda, Saitama
- Otaki Castle, Otaki, Chiba
- Oyama Castle, Haibara District, Shizuoka
- Ōzato Castle, Nanjō, Okinawa
- Ōzu Castle, Ōzu, Ehime

== S ==
- Saga Castle, Saga, Saga
- Sagiyama Castle, Gifu, Gifu Prefecture
- Saiki Castle, Saiki, Ōita
- Sakura Castle, Sakura, Chiba
- Sakurabora Castle, Gero, Gifu
- Sano Castle, Sano, Tochigi
- Sarukake Castle, Akitakata, Hiroshima
- Sarukake Castle, Kurashiki, Okayama
- Sasayama Castle, Sasayama, Hyōgo
- Satowara Castle, Miyazaki, Miyazaki
- Sawayama Castle, Hikone, Shiga
- Sekiyado Castle, Noda, Chiba
- Senshu Castle, Senshu, Osaka
- Shakujii castle, Nerima, Tokyo
- Shibata Castle, Shibata, Niigata
- Shichinohe Castle, Kamikita District, Aomori
- Shikizan Castle
- Shimabara Castle, Shimabara, Nagasaki
- Shimo-Akasaka Castle, Senshu, Osaka
- Shimotsui Castle, Kurashiki, Okayama
- Shinpu Castle, Nirasaki, Yamanashi
- Shirakawa Castle, Shirakawa, Fukushima
- Shiroishi Castle, Shiroishi, Miyagi
- Shizugatake Castle, Shizugatake, Omi
- Shoryuji Castle, Nagaokakyō, Kyoto
- Shuri Castle, Naha, Okinawa
- Sumoto Castle, Sumoto, Hyōgo
- Sunomata Castle, Ōgaki, Gifu
- Sunpu Castle, Shizuoka, Shizuoka

== T ==
- Tahara Castle, Tahara, Aichi
- Taka Castle, Matsuzaka, Mie
- Takada Castle, Jōetsu, Niigata
- Takamatsu Castle, Takamatsu, Kagawa
- Takamori Castle, Usa, Ōita
- Takaoka Castle, Takaoka, Toyama
- Takasaki Castle, Takasaki, Gunma
- Takashima Castle, Suwa, Nagano
- Takatenjin Castle, Kakegawa, Shizuoka
- Takatori Castle, Takatori, Nara
- Takayama Castle, Takayama, Gifu
- Takeda Castle, Asago, Hyōgo
- Takenoya Castle, Gamagori, Aichi
- Taki-no-jō Castle, Tokorozawa, Saitama
- Tamagusuku Castle, Tamagusuku, Okinawa
- Tamanawa Castle, Kamakura, Kanagawa
- Tanaka Castle, Fujieda, Shizuoka
- Tatebayashi Castle, Tatebayashi, Gunma
- Tateyama Castle, Tateyama, Chiba
- Tatsuno Castle, Tatsuno, Hyōgo
- Tobiyama Castle, Utsunomiya, Tochigi
- Tokushima Castle, Tokushima, Tokushima
- Tomigusuku Castle, Tomigusuku, Okinawa
- Tomioka Castle, Reihoku, Kumamoto
- Tomo Castle, Fukuyama, Hiroshima
- Tottori Castle, Tottori, Tottori
- Toyama Castle, Toyama, Toyama
- Toyoda Castle, Joso, Ibaraki
- Tsu Castle, Tsu, Mie
- Tsuchiura Castle, Tsuchiura, Ibaraki
- Tsuruga Castle, Tsuruga, Fukui
- Tsurumaru Castle, Kagoshima, Kagoshima
- Tsutsujigasaki yakate, Kōfu, Yamanashi
- Tsuwano Castle, Tsuwano, Shimane
- Tsuyama Castle, Tsuyama, Okayama

== U ==
- Uchi Castle, Kagoshima, Kagoshima
- Ueda Castle, Ueda, Nagano
- Uegusuku Castle (Kume), Kumejima, Okinawa
- Uegusuku Castle (Tomigusuku), Tomigusuku, Okinawa
- Uehara Castle, Chino, Nagano
- Ueno Castle, Iga, Mie
- Urado Castle, Kōchi, Kōchi
- Urasoe Castle, Urasoe, Okinawa
- Usuki Castle, Usuki, Ōita
- Uto Castle, Uto, Kumamoto
- Utsunomiya Castle, Utsunomiya, Tochigi
- Uwajima Castle, Uwajima, Ehime
- Uzuki Castle, Matsuyama, Ehime

== W ==
- Wakayama Castle, Wakayama, Wakayama
- Washi Castle, Oyama, Tochigi

== Y ==
- Yagami Castle, Sasayama, Hyōgo
- Yamada Castle, Onna, Okinawa
- Yamagata Castle, Yamagata, Yamagata
- Yamanaka Castle, Mishima, Shizuoka
- Yanagawa Castle, Yanagawa, Fukuoka
- Yatsushiro Castle, Yatsushiro, Kumamoto
- Yodo Castle, Kyoto
- Yokote Castle, Yokote, Akita
- Yonago Castle, Yonago, Tottori
- Yonezawa Castle, Yonezawa, Yamagata
- Yononushi Castle, Wadomari, Kagoshima
- Yoshida Castle, Toyohashi, Aichi
- Yoshida-Kōriyama Castle (Aki-Kōriyama Castle), Akitakata, Hiroshima
- Yuzuki Castle, Matsuyama, Ehime

== Z ==
- Zakimi Castle, Yomitan, Okinawa
- Zeze Castle, Ōtsu, Shiga

== See also ==
- 100 Fine Castles of Japan
- List of castles
- List of National Treasures of Japan (castles)
- List of foreign-style castles in Japan
- Chashi, fortifications built by Ainu people
- Gusuku, World Heritage castles of the Ryūkyū Kingdom
