= Ogasawara Nagatoki =

Japanese samurai daimyō

Ogasawara Nagatoki

Ogasawara Nagatoki (小笠原 長時; November 9, 1519 – April 17, 1583) was a Japanese samurai daimyō of Shinano Province in the Sengoku period.

== Life ==
In 1542, Shinano Province was invaded by Takeda Shingen, and Ogasawara allied with Murakami Yoshikiyo, Suwa Yorishige, and Kiso Yoshiyasu in an attempt to stop him. They met Takeda Shingen's forces at the Battle of Sezawa on 9 March 1542, and were defeated.

Following this defeat, and the conquest of his lands, Ogasawara allied himself with Uesugi Kenshin, Takeda's primary rival. He fought alongside Takatō Yoritsugu in 1545, ultimately failing in their defense against the first siege of Takatō Castle.

Ogasawara was defeated by Shingen again several years later, in the 1548 Battle of Shiojiritoge, in which he was hit by a surprise attack at dawn; many of his men were killed as they reached for weapons and armor. His losing streak continued the following year, when Shingen seized a number of fortresses, including Fukashi (now Matsumoto Castle), in the Siege of Fukashi.

This final, bitter loss caused Ogasawara Nagatoki to retreat to Kyoto, where he taught horsemanship and archery (Kyūdō) until his murder in 1583. Some of his descendants became daimyo in the Edo period, most notably as rulers of the Kokura Domain.

== See also ==
- Ogasawara clan
