= Statistics of national treasures of Japan =

This table shows the number of national treasures of Japan in each prefecture grouped by type of the property. Gold colored cells mark prefectures with the largest number of national treasures for the given category (column).

Prefecture	Fine arts and crafts								Buildings and structures								Total	Sum
Prefecture	Ancient documents	Archaeol. materials	Crafts	Historical materials	Paintings	Sculptures	Writings	Sum	Castles	Resid.	Minka	Shrines	Temples	Industry	Schools	Misc. struct.	Total	Sum
Aichi	—	—	9	—	2	—	4	15	1	1	—	—	1	—	—	—	3	18
Akita	—	—	1	—	—	—	—	1	—	—	—	—	—	—	—	—	0	1
Aomori	—	1	2	—	—	—	—	3	—	—	—	—	—	—	—	—	0	3
Chiba	2	—	1	1	—	—	5	9	—	—	—	—	—	—	—	—	0	9
Ehime	—	1	8	—	—	—	—	9	—	—	—	—	3	—	—	—	3	12
Fukui	—	—	3	—	—	—	1	4	—	—	—	—	2	—	—	—	2	6
Fukuoka	1	6	6	—	2	—	2	17	—	—	—	—	—	—	—	—	0	17
Fukushima	—	—	—	—	—	1	1	2	—	—	—	—	1	—	—	—	1	3
Gifu	1	—	2	—	—	—	—	3	—	—	—	—	3	—	—	—	3	6
Gunma	—	1	1	—	—	—	—	2	—	—	—	—	—	1	—	—	1	3
Hiroshima	—	—	14	—	2	—	1	17	—	—	—	1	6	—	—	—	7	24
Hokkaido	—	2	—	—	—	—	—	2	—	—	—	—	—	—	—	—	0	2
Hyōgo	—	1	2	—	2	1	3	9	5	—	2	—	6	—	—	—	13	22
Ibaraki	—	—	2	—	—	—	—	2	—	—	—	—	—	—	—	—	0	2
Ishikawa	—	—	2	—	—	—	—	2	—	—	—	—	—	—	—	—	0	2
Iwate	—	—	4	—	1	1	1	7	—	—	—	—	1	—	—	—	1	8
Kagawa	—	—	1	—	—	—	3	4	—	—	—	1	1	—	—	—	2	6
Kagoshima	—	—	1	—	—	—	—	1	—	—	—	1	—	—	—	—	1	2
Kanagawa	—	—	6	—	6	1	5	18	—	—	—	—	1	—	—	—	1	19
Kōchi	—	—	1	—	—	—	1	2	—	—	—	—	1	—	—	—	1	3
Kumamoto	—	—	—	—	—	—	—	0	—	—	—	1	—	—	—	1	2	2
Kyoto	29	4	18	—	55	42	70	218	—	11	—	9	32	0.5 (Note: Kyoto and Shiga prefecture share the Lake Biwa Canal facilities. They are listed as half a site each.)	—	1	53.5	271.5
Mie	—	2	—	—	—	—	3	5	—	—	—	—	2	—	—	—	2	7
Miyagi	1	—	—	1	—	—	2	4	—	—	—	1	2	—	—	—	3	7
Miyazaki	—	—	—	—	—	—	—	0	—	—	—	—	—	—	—	—	0	0
Nagano	—	2	1	—	—	—	—	3	1	—	—	1	3	—	1	—	6	9
Nagasaki	—	—	—	—	—	—	—	0	—	—	—	—	2	—	—	1	3	3
Nara	4	10	40	—	19	77	17	167	—	—	—	5	59	—	—	—	64	231
Niigata	—	1	—	—	—	—	—	1	—	—	—	—	—	—	—	—	0	1
Ōita	—	—	1	—	—	1	—	2	—	—	—	1	1	—	—	—	2	4
Okayama	—	—	5	—	2	—	—	7	—	—	—	1	—	—	—	1	2	9
Okinawa	—	—	—	1	—	—	—	1	—	—	—	—	—	—	—	1	1	2
Osaka	2	3	21	—	8	5	14	53	—	—	—	2	3	—	—	—	5	58
Saga	—	—	—	—	—	—	1	1	—	—	—	—	—	—	—	—	0	1
Saitama	—	1	2	—	—	—	1	4	—	—	—	1	—	—	—	—	1	5
Shiga	9	1	5	—	4	4	12	35	1	2	—	7	12	0.5	—	—	22.5	57.5
Shimane	—	2	2	—	—	—	—	4	1	—	—	2	—	—	—	—	3	7
Shizuoka	1	—	7	—	1	1	2	12	—	—	—	1	—	—	—	—	1	13
Tochigi	1	—	4	—	—	—	5	10	—	—	—	6	1	—	—	—	7	17
Tokushima	—	—	—	—	—	—	—	0	—	—	—	—	—	—	—	—	0	0
Tokyo	10	12	73	—	51	3	72	221	—	1	—	—	1	—	—	—	2	223
Tottori	—	1	—	—	1	—	—	2	—	—	—	1	—	—	—	—	1	3
Toyama	—	—	—	—	—	—	—	0	—	—	—	—	2	—	—	—	2	2
Wakayama	1	—	3	—	9	5	9	27	—	—	—	—	7	—	—	—	7	34
Yamagata	1	1	2	—	1	—	—	5	—	—	—	—	1	—	—	—	1	6
Yamaguchi	—	—	3	—	1	—	2	6	—	—	—	1	2	—	—	—	3	9
Yamanashi	—	—	1	—	2	—	—	3	—	—	—	—	2	—	—	—	2	5
Sum	63	52	254	3	168	142	237	919	9	15	2	43	158	2	1	5	235	1154
