= Siege of Takatō =

Siege of Takatō The Siege of Takatō may refer to two different encounters throughout samurai history (Sengoku period - 16th century).

Siege of Takato may refer to the following:

- Siege of Takatō (1545) - certain siege by Takeda Shingen
- Siege of Takatō (1582) - siege of Takeda Morinobu (Oda Nobutada)
