= Fukashi =

Fukashi may refer to:

- Fukashi, a Japanese fortress captured during the 16th-century Siege of Fukashi
- Fukashi, a stick-like wagashi made in Kawagoe, Saitama from wheat bran coated in brown sugar

== People ==
- Fukashi Azuma (東 不可止, born 1966), Japanese anime producer and head of the marketing and business development in the TV Tokyo organization department
- Fukashi Minamimura (1917–1990), Japanese baseball player
- Fukashi Mizutani (水谷 深, born 1991), Japanese kickboxer
- Fukashi Sugimura (杉村 濬), Japanese acquitted victim from the assassination of Empress Myeongseong

== Fictional characters ==
- Fukashi Hamanaka (浜中 深志), a character from the novel Subete ga F ni Naru
