= Fire Horse =

Forty-third element of the sexagenary cycle

Chinese name
- Chinese: 丙午
Transcriptions
Standard Mandarin
- Hanyu Pinyin: bǐngwǔ

Vietnamese name
- Vietnamese alphabet: Bính Ngọ
- Chữ Hán: 丙午

South Korean name
- Hangul: 병오
- Hanja: 丙午
Transcriptions
- Revised Romanization: byeongo

Japanese name
- Kanji: 丙午
- Kana: ひのえうま へいご
Transcriptions
- Romanization: hinoeuma heigo

Sexagenary cycle
01; Wood Rat	02; Wood Ox	03; Fire Tiger	04; Fire Rabbit	05; Earth Dragon	06; Earth Snake
07; Metal Horse	08; Metal Goat	09; Water Monkey	10; Water Rooster	11; Wood Dog	12; Wood Pig
13; Fire Rat	14; Fire Ox	15; Earth Tiger	16; Earth Rabbit	17; Metal Dragon	18; Metal Snake
19; Water Horse	20; Water Goat	21; Wood Monkey	22; Wood Rooster	23; Fire Dog	24; Fire Pig
25; Earth Rat	26; Earth Ox	27; Metal Tiger	28; Metal Rabbit	29; Water Dragon	30; Water Snake
31; Wood Horse	32; Wood Goat	33; Fire Monkey	34; Fire Rooster	35; Earth Dog	36; Earth Pig
37; Metal Rat	38; Metal Ox	39; Water Tiger	40; Water Rabbit	41; Wood Dragon	42; Wood Snake
43; Fire Horse	44; Fire Goat	45; Earth Monkey	46; Earth Rooster	47; Metal Dog	48; Metal Pig
49; Water Rat	50; Water Ox	51; Wood Tiger	52; Wood Rabbit	53; Fire Dragon	54; Fire Snake
55; Earth Horse	56; Earth Goat	57; Metal Monkey	58; Metal Rooster	59; Water Dog	60; Water Pig

Heavenly Stems ・ Earthly Branches

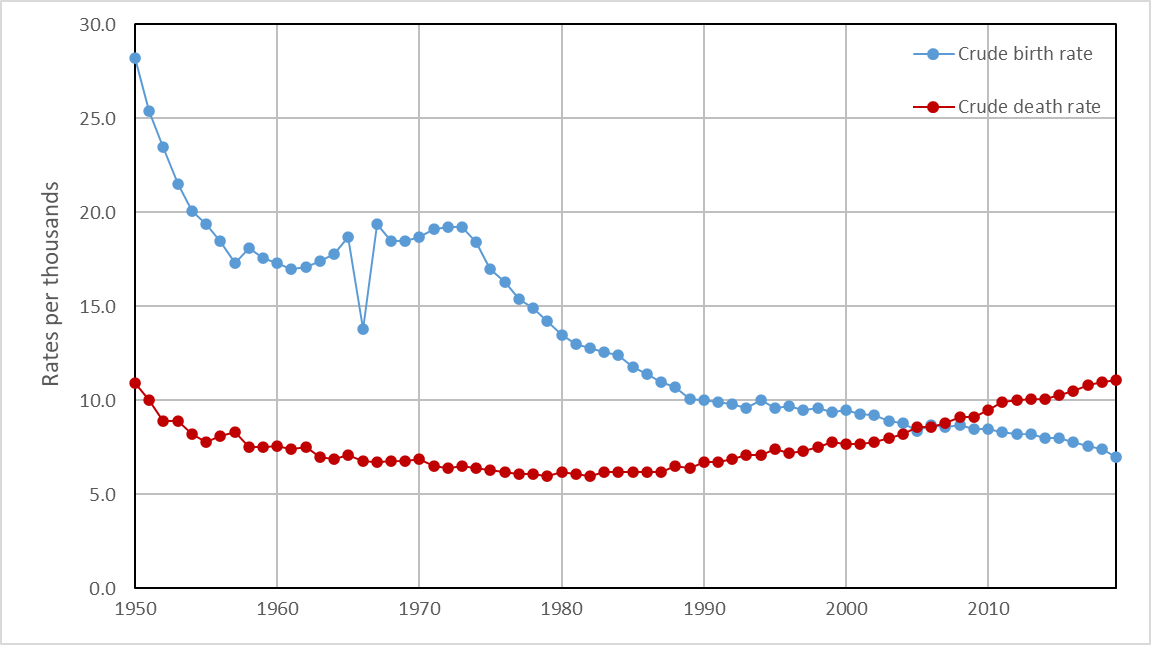
Japanese birth and death rates since 1950. The drop in 1966 was due to it being a hinoe-uma year.

The fire horse (Japanese: 丙午 (ひのえうま); hinoe-uma, or へいご, heigo) or bing wu (Chinese: 丙午; pinyin: bǐngwǔ) or Bính Ngọ is the 43rd combination of the sexagenary cycle. It is preceded by Wood Snake and followed by Fire Goat. In the traditional correspondence of the Heavenly Stems with the Five Phases, bǐng (丙) represents yang and Fire, while the Earthly Branch wǔ (午) corresponds to the Horse zodiac. It is said that birthrates in Japan tend to see a sharp decline in hinoe-uma years.

== Superstition ==
=== Origin ===
There is a superstition that "a woman born in the year of the fire horse has a strong temperament, shortens her husband's life and bring ruin to their families and maybe even kill their husbands." It is said that the superstition in the early Edo period that "there are many fires in the year of the fire horse", changed to a superstition about women's marriage because Yaoya Oshichi was believed to have been born during the fire horse.

In the Edo period, all human ages were counted using East Asian age reckoning, and if Yaoya Oshichi was born during the fire horse in 1666, then she would have been 18 years old in 1683 when she was burned at the stake. However in various biographies, such as that of Ihara Saikaku, she is 16 years old. Ki no Kaion, in his jōruri Yaoya Oshichi, placed Oshichi's birth as during the fire horse, which influenced the jōruri Junshoku Edo Murasaki (Japanese: 潤色江戸紫) by Tamenaga Tarobei (Japanese: 為長太郎兵衛) et al. to say the same. Baba Bunkō in his work Kinsei Kōto Chobunshū (Japanese: 近世江都著聞集) states that Yaoya Oshichi being 11 years old when she hung a plaque at Tennō-ji in 1676 was the basis for assigning her birth year to 1666.

Ki no Kaion had a strong influence on the theatrical world, and the story in Bunkō's Kinsei Kōto Chobunshū has long been considered a true story, although it has been denied in modern times.

=== Births in 1906 ===
This superstition continued even into the Meiji era, and in 1906 the number of births decreased by about 4% from the previous year. In some cases, the births of boys were reported to have been shifted to the year before or after they were actually born.

Around 1924, when women born in 1906 were of marriageable age, there was a series of stories denying the superstition and reports of suicides of women whose marriage proposals were broken off, suggesting that the superstition of fire horse births affected women's marriages. (Note: An example from the press "Girls turning 19 this year, troubled by superstitions; caught up in the distantly related 'fire horse' superstition", Asahi Shimbun, 10 February 1924 Morning Edition (in Japanese).) In his novel Gubijinzō published in 1907, Natsume Soseki describes Fujio, an evil woman who deceives the main character, as being "a fire horse".

The novelist Ango Sakaguchi, who was born in this year, was given the name Heigo (炳五), which means fire horse (丙午 (へいご), heigo), and left a story in his writings about how he was told by relatives that it was "lucky he was born a man". Sakaguchi predicted that this superstition would not go away, which would turn out to be the case in 1966.

=== Births in 1966 ===
This superstition remained strong in the Shōwa era, and the birth rate in 1966 dropped 25% from the previous year. Many couples avoided having children or had abortions, especially in rural and regional areas (Note: Statistics also reported a high number of abortions. "Abortion in Japan is Unusually High," Asahi Shimbun, 22 August 1966, Evening Edition (in Japanese).) and the number of births was extremely low compared to other years, with only 1,360,974 births. On the other hand, the number of births between the previous year and the following year increased.

Since there were fewer children born in 1966, it was often discussed at the time whether it was easier to take high school and college entrance examinations in this school year (the population including early-borns in 1967 was about 1.6 million) than in other years, but there was no significant difference in the general college entrance rate. While no such increase was seen, the rate of entry into public universities increased in 1985. Additionally, in 1985 the first child rate was 50.9%, the highest ever in statistical history.

On the other hand, Japanese local governments took the following actions against fire horse superstitions: In November 1965, the Yamagata District Legal Affairs Bureau of the Ministry of Justice sponsored the "Fire Horse Banishment Campaign" in Yamagata City, and on the 21st of the same month, a parade was held in the city to raise awareness of the issue. According to the Legal Affairs Bureau, this was due to a number of consultations regarding the issue of childbearing, which led to divorce settlements and harassment from neighbors. A similar movement was also underway in Kasukawa-mura in Gunma Prefecture (now Kasukawa-cho, Maebashi), led by the village mayor, who declared it a "village of banishment of superstition". The village office conducted a survey of 1,400 women born in 1906 and the years before and after, and worked to publicize the fact that fire horse superstitions have no basis. The city of Kurume in Fukuoka Prefecture strongly rejected fire horse beliefs in its public relations paper, calling it "a fairy tale from once upon a time", "a truly strange custom most unbecoming of a scientific Japan, which last year produced its second Nobel Prize winner", and "of the world of fairy tales".

=== Births in 2026 ===
Between 2024 and 2025, many scholars and experts speculated that the trend would not significantly affect 2026 birth rates.

== Traditional Japanese Medicine and the Fire Horse Year ==
In Traditional Japanese Medicine (TJM), acupuncture, herbology and massage, the element of Fire governs the Heart/Mind (Shin神) which is responsible for emotional stability and clarity, In Japanese medicine the Fire Horse year is double the Fire Element in the Gogyo (五行) philosophy creating the highest Yo (ヨウ) energy posable. As it is a year of immense creativity and personal drive in Traditional Japanese Medicine when left unchecked the heat from the Fire rises up and out, creating reckless momentum that is over reacting and over reaching or extending in one's life. When in excess this can lead to burnout and excessive mental activity leading to physiological palpitations, sweating and psychological mental conditions of restless, anxiety, manic behaviour and in server cases hallucinations and or mania, by extension on a societal level turmoil and upheaval.

== Fire Horse years ==
1st millennium	2nd millennium	3rd millennium	4th millennium
46; 106; 166; 226; 286; 346; 406; 466; 526; 586; 646; 706; 766; 826; 886; 946	1006; 1066; 1126; 1186; 1246; 1306; 1366; 1426; 1486; 1546; 1606; 1666; 1726; 1786; 1846; 1906; 1966	2026; 2086; 2146; 2206; 2266; 2326; 2386; 2446; 2506; 2566; 2626; 2686; 2746; 2806; 2866; 2926; 2986	3046; 3106; 3166; 3226; 3286; 3346; 3406; 3466; 3526; 3586; 3646; 3706; 3766; 3826; 3886; 3946

== Fire Horse months ==
When months are numbered using the sexagenary cycle, the fifth month of a year whose heavenly stem is 丁 (dīng) or 壬 (rén) is a Fire Horse month.

== Fire Horse days ==
A Fire Horse day occurs every 60 days according to the following table:

2023	2024	2025	2026	2027	2028	2029
17 February; 18 April; 17 June; 16 August; 15 October; 14 December	12 February; 12 April; 11 June; 10 August; 9 October; 8 December	6 February; 7 April; 6 June; 5 August; 4 October; 3 December	1 February; 2 April; 1 June; 31 July; 29 September; 28 November	27 January; 28 March; 27 May; 26 July; 24 September; 23 November	22 January; 22 March; 21 May; 20 July; 18 September; 17 November	16 January; 17 March; 16 May; 15 July; 13 September; 12 November
