= Siege of Kuwabara =

1542 siege

- Part of Sengoku period
Date	1542
Location	Kuwabara, Shinano Province 36°01′33″N 138°08′23″E
Result	Takeda victory

Belligerents
Forces of Suwa Yorishige	Takeda family forces

Commanders and leaders
Suwa Yorishige †	Takeda Shingen

Strength
1,100	3,000
- Location within Nagano Prefecture Siege of Kuwabara (Japan)

The siege of Kuwabara took place the day after the siege of Uehara; Takeda Shingen continued to gain power in Shinano Province by seizing Kuwabara castle from Suwa Yorishige. Suwa was escorted back to the provincial capital of Kōfu under "the pretext of safe conduct, but he was then forced to commit suicide."
