= Battle of Shiojiritoge =

1548 battle

- Part of the Sengoku period
| Date | August 22, 1548 |
| Location | Shiojiritoge, Shinano Province 36°04′12″N 138°01′40″E |
| Result | Takeda victory |

Belligerents
| Takeda clan | Ogasawara clan |

Commanders and leaders
| Takeda Shingen | Ogasawara Nagatoki |
- Location within Nagano Prefecture Battle of Shiojiritoge (Japan)

The 1548 Battle of Shiojiritoge was one of many battles fought by Takeda Shingen in his bid to conquer Japan's Shinano Province.

== History ==
It took place soon after Shingen had suffered a devastating loss in the Battle of Uedahara; he sought revenge, and to return to a string of victories.

Shingen launched a surprise attack upon Ogasawara Nagatoki's camp, using only a small rapid strike mounted force. Approaching in the night and attacking at dawn, Shingen caught his enemy unprepared, taking the camp as Ogasawara's men "grabbed their armor and swords."

This battle was one of many which serve as examples of Takeda Shingen's expertise and specialty in using cavalry to maximum effect.
