= Siege of Kiso Fukushima =

Siege of Kiso-Fukushima
- Part of the Sengoku period
Date	1554
Location	Fukushima Castle, Kiso River Valley, Shinano province, Japan
Result	Siege succeeds; Takeda victory
Territorial changes	Fukushima falls to Takeda Shingen

Belligerents
Takeda clan	Fukushima castle garrison

Commanders and leaders
Takeda Shingen	Kiso Yoshiyasu

Strength
3,600	2,000

The 1554 siege of Kiso-Fukushima was a siege by Takeda Shingen on Fukushima Castle, in the Kiso River Valley of Shinano province. This was one of many battles fought during Shingen's campaign to seize control of Shinano.

Kiso Yoshiyasu, commander of the besieged castle, surrendered as his garrison ran out of food and water, as a result of Shingen's starvation siege tactics.
