= Miyagi, Gunma =

Village in Gunma, Japan

Miyagi (宮城村, Miyagi-mura) was a village located in Seta District, Gunma Prefecture, Japan.

As of 2003, the village had an estimated population of 8,468 and a density of 175.87 persons per km^{2}. The total area was 48.15 km^{2}.

On December 5, 2004, Miyagi, along with the town of Ōgo, and the village of Kasukawa (all from Seta District), was merged into the expanded city of Maebashi and no longer exists as an independent municipality.
