= Kamiizumi Castle =

Castle in Kōzuke, Japan

Kamiizumi Castle (上泉城, Kamiizumi-jō) was a Japanese castle located in the province of Kōzuke (present-day Gunma Prefecture) during the early Sengoku period of Japanese history. Although the castle is destroyed, it is best known as the birthplace of Kamiizumi Nobutsuna. It is known that Nobutsuna's father made sure that his son was well-versed in the ways of bujutsu (martial arts) and he thoroughly trained his son many times near his castle. Through his father's training, Nobutsuna soon became a master of the spear and sword.
