= Siege of Takatō (1545) =

1545 certain siege by Takeda Shingen

- Part of the Sengoku period
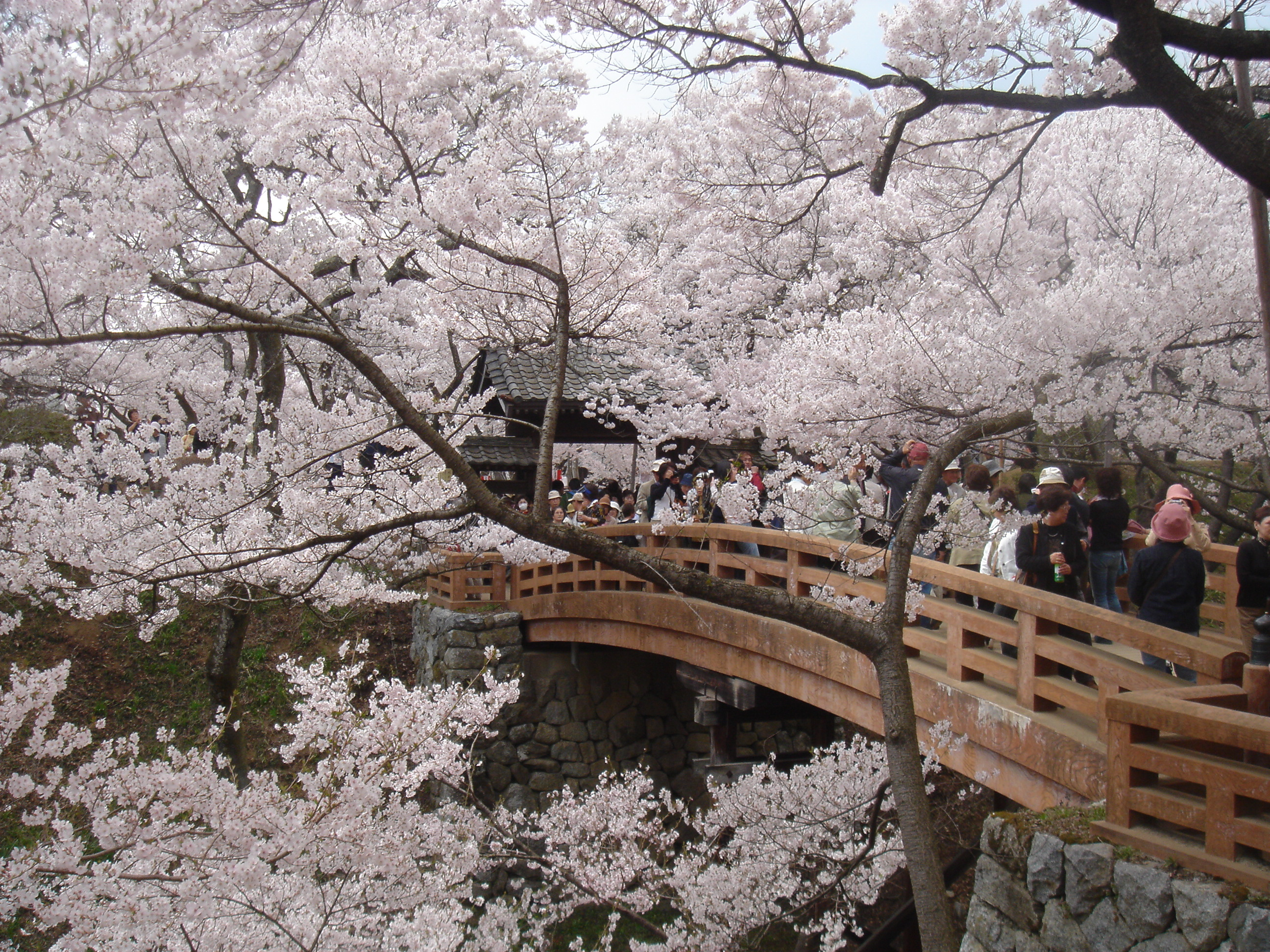
- Castle gate hidden behind sakura
Date	1545
Location	Takatō Castle, Shinano Province, Japan 35°49′59″N 138°03′46″E
Result	Takeda victory

Belligerents
forces of Takeda Shingen	forces of Takatō Yoritsugu

Commanders and leaders
Takeda Shingen; Itagaki Nobukata	Ogasawara Nagatoki; Tozawa Yorichika

Strength
5,000	5,100
- Location within Nagano Prefecture Siege of Takatō (1545) (Japan)

The 1545 siege of Takatō Castle, saw Takeda Shingen continuing his sweep through the Ima Valley of Shinano Province, seeking to take control of the entire province. He defeated Takatō Yoritsugu, the castellan.

== History ==
Yoritsugu had relied on support from his allies, Ogasawara Nagatoki and Tozawa Yorichika, who failed to aid in his defense. This marked the first time Takatō castle had been besieged.

== See also ==
- Siege of Takatō (1582)
