= Kuwabara Castle =

Coordinates: 36°01′33″N 138°08′23″E

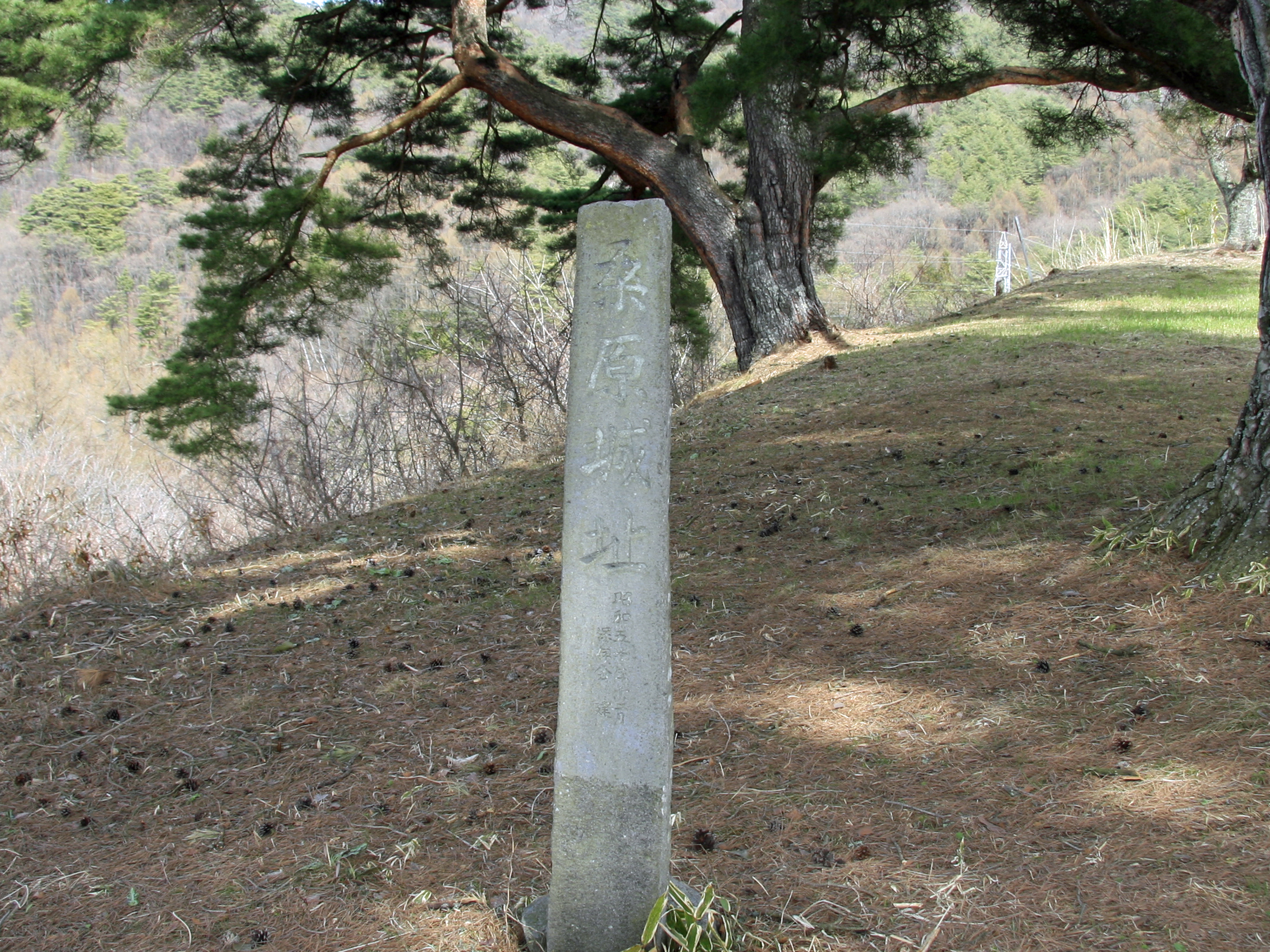

Kuwabara Castle (桑原城, Kuwabara-jō), also known as Takatoya Castle and Suisho Castle, is a yamashiro (castle located on a mountain) situated in Suwa, Nagano Prefecture, Japan. The castle was constructed sometime in the fifteenth century by the Kuwabara clan. By the time it came under the control of the Suwa clan, it had become a satellite castle to Uehara Castle. When forces of the Takeda clan arrived in the area in 1542, the lord of Uehara Castle, Suwa Yorishige, retreated to Kuwabara Castle, which was soon surrounded by Takeda soldiers. The castle fell after a two-day siege. Yorishige and his two brothers were taken to Kofu. A month later, they were forced to commit seppuku.
