= Fukui Castle (Osaka) =

- 福井城
- Ibaraki, Osaka in Japan
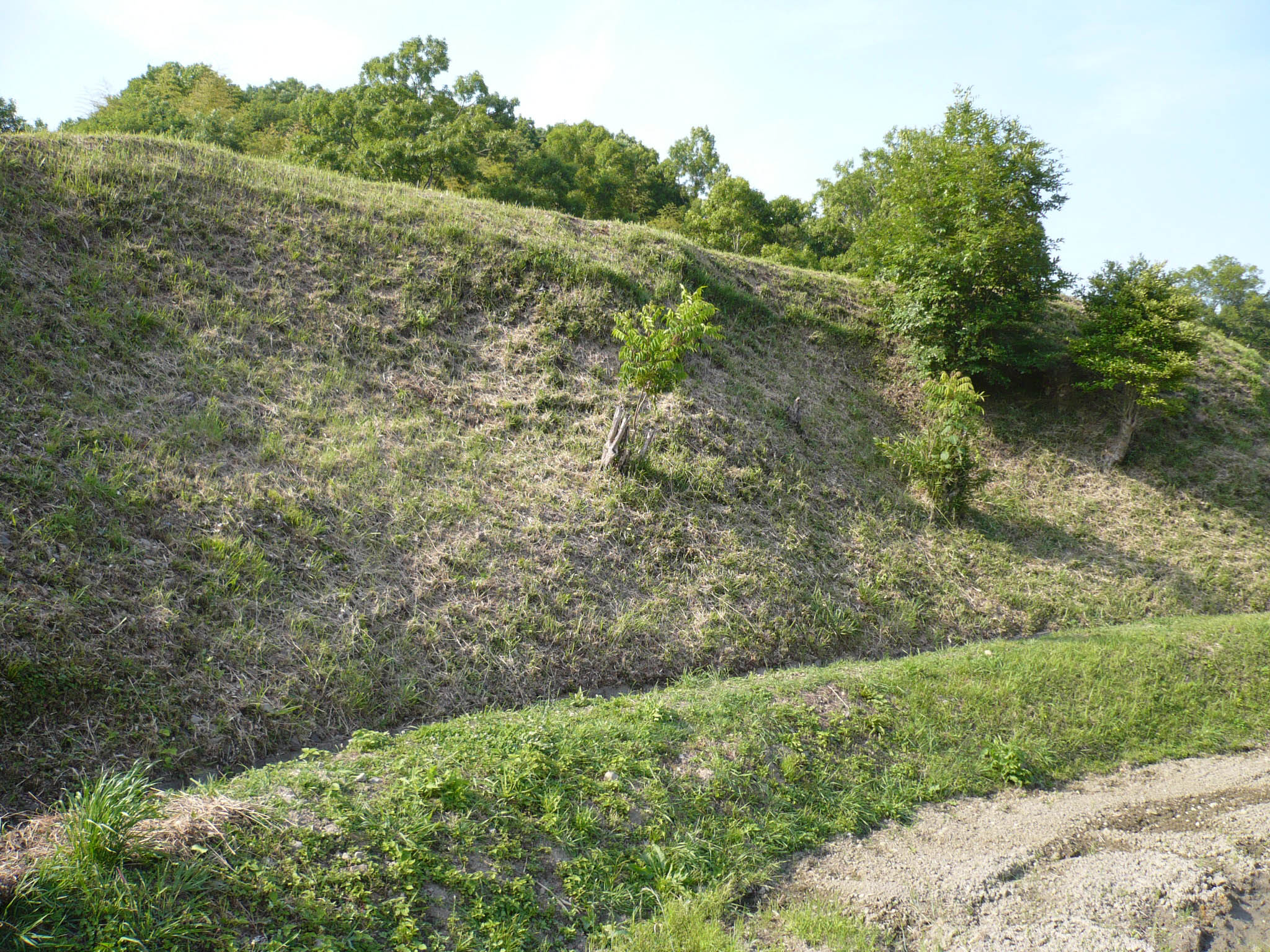
- Plateau under the inner citadel.

Site information
- Type: Mountain castles

Location
- Coordinates: 34°51′5.018″N 135°33′1.44″E

Site history
- Built: unknown
- In use: 1528

Fukui Castle (福井城, Fukui-jō) was a hill top castle located at Ibaraki, Osaka, Japan. It was burned to the ground in 1657.

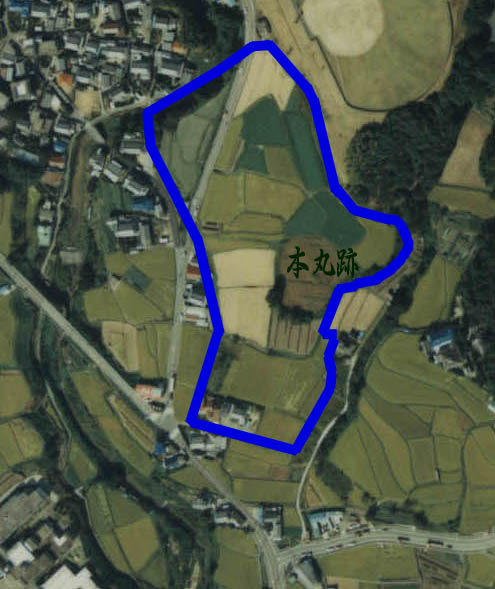
Blue line indicates castle area.本丸跡 indicates the place where there was the Honmaru

== Literature ==
- 『日本城郭大系（第12巻、大阪・兵庫）』 新人物従来社, Mar.,1981 (Japanese)
- 『わがまち茨木（城郭編）』 茨木市教育委員会, Mar.,1987 (Japanese)
- De Lange, William (2021). An Encyclopedia of Japanese Castles. Groningen: Toyo Press. pp. 600 pages. ISBN 978-9492722300.
