= Sakurabora Castle =

Coordinates: 35°53′10″N 137°13′44″E

Sakurabora Castle (桜洞城, Sakurabora-jō) was a medieval Japanese castle built in the Hida Province. It is now located in the present-day city of Gero, Gifu Prefecture. It was constructed by the daimyō Mitsuki Naoyori (三木直頼) in 1544, near the end of the Sengoku period.

== History ==
In 1579, the ruler of Hida Province Mitsugi Yoritsuna (三木自綱) began construction on Matsukura Castle, intending it as the new home for the Mitsugi clan. From the start of construction until the Mitsugi clan could be installed into the new castle, Sakurabora served as Yoritsuna's seat of power. Thereafter, once the clan was established in Matsukura Castle, the Mitsugi used Sakurabora as their winter home.

In 1585, Kanamori Nagachika attacked and captured Sakurabora Castle. Nagachika built his own fortress, Hagiwara-Suwa Castle (萩原諏訪城, Hagiwara-suwa-jō). After that time, Sakurabora Castle fell into disuse.

== Present day ==
The JR Takayama Line runs by the site where Sakurabora Castle once stood. Today, only traces of the old earthen walls remain. They are accessible on foot, about 20 minutes from Hida-Hagiwara Station.
