= Ōgo, Gunma =

Dissolved municipality in Gunma prefecture, Japan

Ōgo (大胡町, Ōgo-machi) was a town located in Seta District, Gunma Prefecture, Japan.

As of 2003, the town had an estimated population of 17,048 and a density of 862.75 persons per km^{2}. The total area was 19.76 km^{2}.

On December 5, 2004, Ōgo, along with the villages of Kasukawa and Miyagi (all from Seta District), was merged into the expanded city of Maebashi and no longer exists as an independent municipality.
