= Siege of Fukashi =

1550 siege

Coordinates: 36.2388°N 137.9691°E

- Part of the Sengoku period
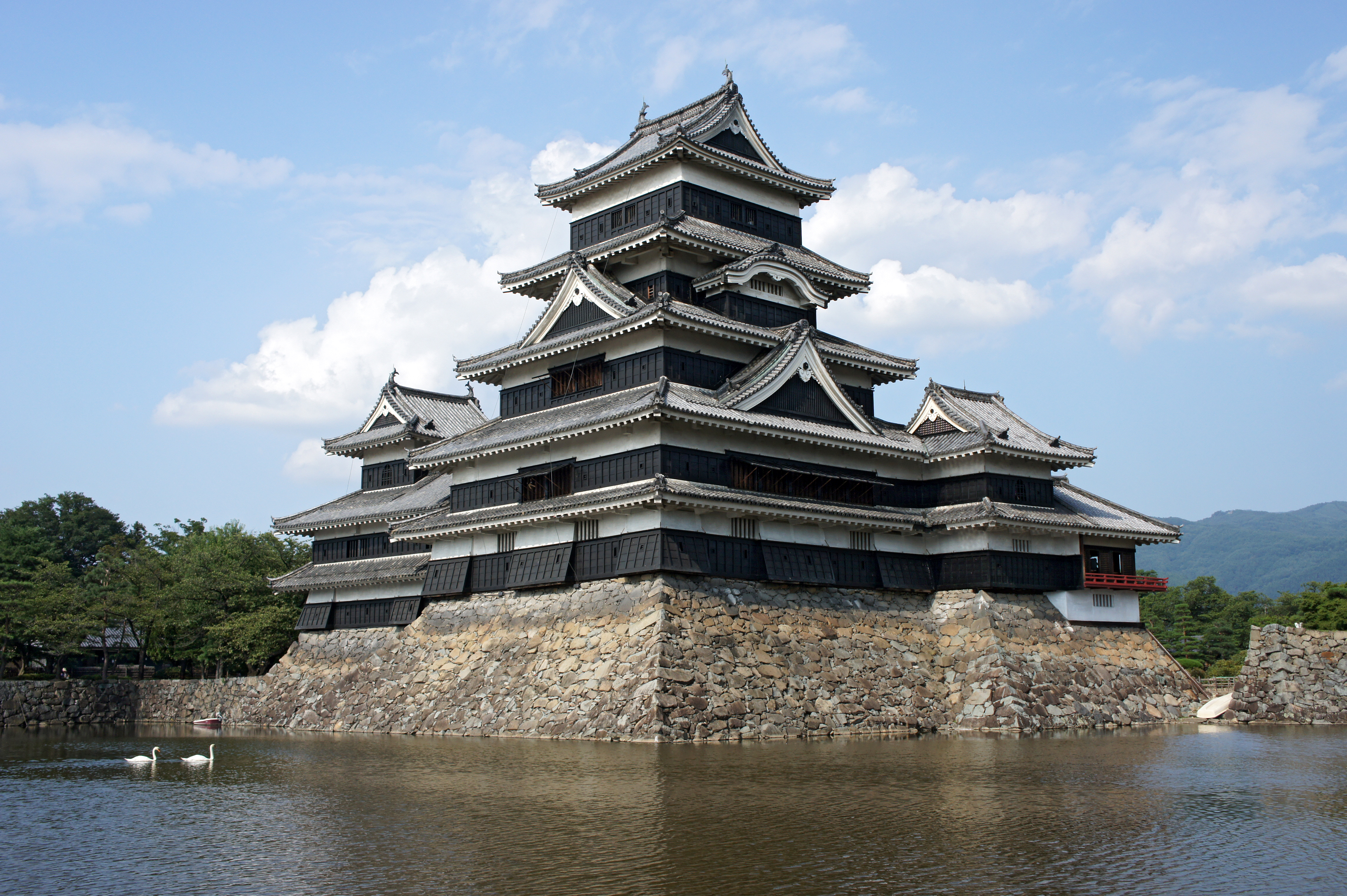
- Matsumoto Castle, which stands on the site of the earlier Fukashi Castle
Date	1550
Location	Fukashi Castle, Nagano Prefecture, Japan
Result	Takeda victory. Ogasawara Nagatoki forced to abandon his lands.

Belligerents
Takeda clan	Ogasawara clan

Commanders and leaders
Takeda Shingen	Ogasawara Nagatoki

Strength
3,200	4,000

The 1550 siege of Fukashi was one of a series of battles waged by Takeda Shingen in his long campaign to conquer Shinano province, which was ruled by a number of minor daimyō, notably the Suwa, Ogasawara, Murakami and Takato.

Shingen mounted his first invasion of Shinano in 1542 and steadily worked his way northwards, defeating the Suwa and Takato by 1547. His inexorable advance through the province alarmed the Uesugi clan, which controlled Echigo province to the north, and in 1547 Uesugi Norimasa sent an army into the province to confront Shingen, but this was swept aside at Odaihara. At this point the Murakami and Ogasawara finally entered the fray, and Murakami Yoshikiyo succeeded in defeating Shingen at Uedahara (1548), but Shingen regrouped and went back on the offensive in 1550. Identifying Yoshikiyo as the greater threat, he decided to concentrate his initial efforts on the weaker Ogasawara, and attacked their principal castle at Fukashi.

Shingen was able to seize Fukashi without much difficulty, and Shingen placed Baba Nobuharu in charge of the fortress. Matsumoto Castle was later built on the site.

The loss of Fukashi broke the power of the Ogasawara clan, and Ogasawara Nagatoki was forced to flee and seek refuge with his ally Murakami Yoshikiyo at Katsurao, which was itself besieged by Shingen four years later.
