= Kasukawa, Gunma =

Dissolved municipality in Seta district, Gunma prefecture, Japan

Kasukawa (粕川村, Kasukawa-mura) was a village located in Seta District, Gunma Prefecture, Japan.

As of 2003, the village had an estimated population of 11,529 and a density of 443.94 persons per km^{2}. The total area was 25.97 km^{2}.

On December 5, 2004, Kasukawa, along with the town of Ōgo, and the village of Miyagi (all from Seta District), was merged into the expanded city of Maebashi and no longer exists as an independent municipality.
