= Fukushima Castle (Shinano Province) =

- 福島城
- Kiso, Nagano, Japan
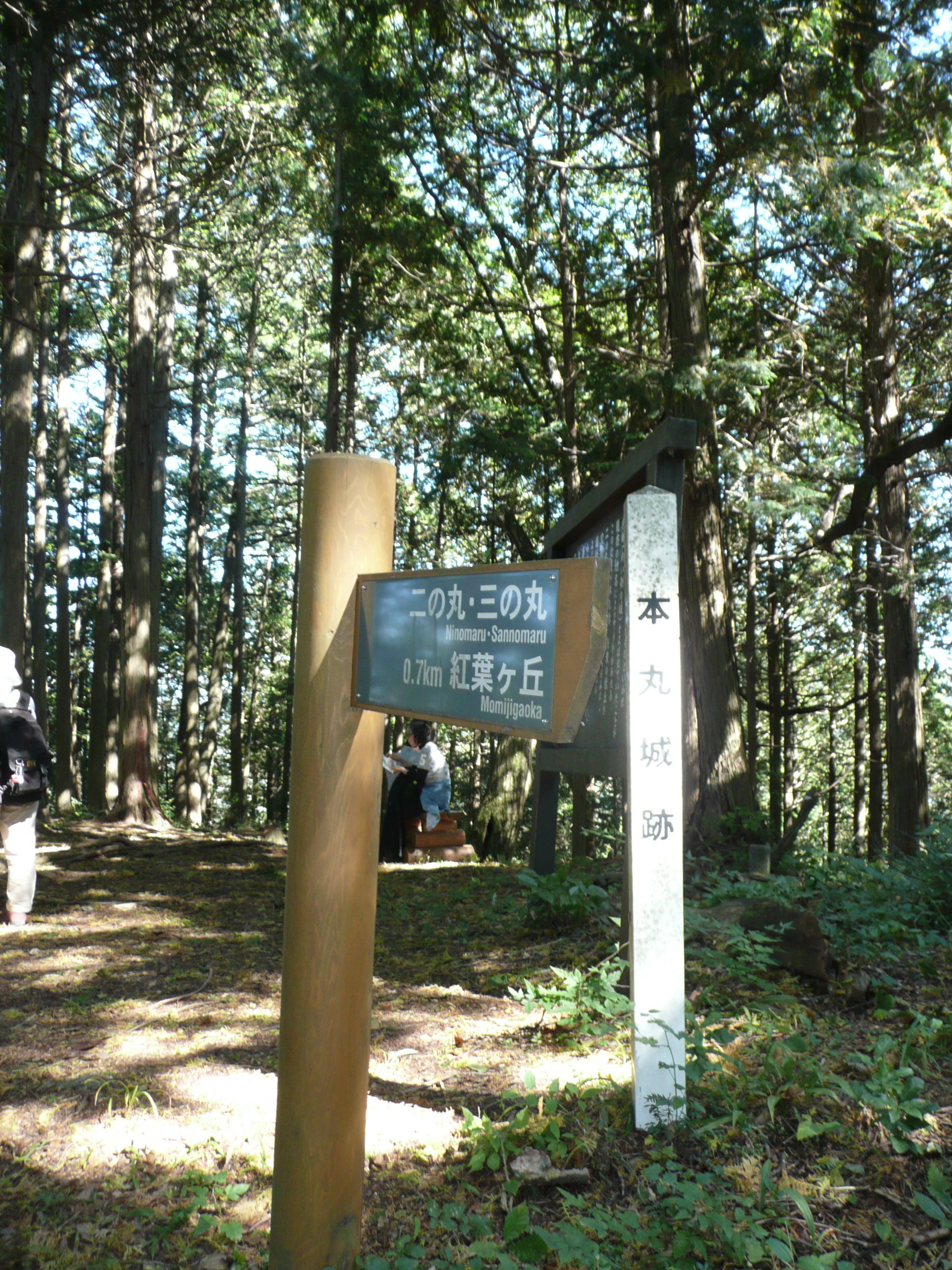
- Sign at the location of the castle ruins.

Site information
- Type: flatland-style Japanese castle
- Condition: demolished

Location
- Fukushima Castle Fukushima Castle (Shinano Province) (Japan)
- Coordinates: 35°51′18″N 137°41′41″E

Site history
- Built: 1532-1554
- In use: Sengoku period
- Fate: abandoned in 1598

Fukushima Castle (福島城, Fukushima-jō) was a castle located on the Kiso river in Kiso, Nagano, Japan.

== History ==
Fukushima Castle was the site of the Siege of Kiso-Fukushima led by Takeda Shingen in 1554. The castle's commander, Kiso Yoshiyasu surrendered the garrison when the food supplies ran out. The castle no longer stands.
