= Matsumoto Castle =

Castle in the Nagano Prefecture, Japan

- 松本城
- Matsumoto, Nagano Prefecture, Japan
- The keep and connected buildings

Site information
- Type: Hirashiro (flatland castle)
- Condition: Original keep (tenshu) and several other buildings and inner walls survive, several gates have been rebuilt since 1960

Location
- Location within Japan
- Coordinates: 36°14′20″N 137°58′09″E

Site history
- Built: Current structures date from 1594; 432 years ago
- Built by: Shimadachi Sadanaga
- In use: 1504; 522 years ago to 1868; 158 years ago
- Materials: Earth, stone, and wood
- Demolished: Outer castle was taken down and the land reclaimed in the Meiji Restoration

Matsumoto Castle (松本城, Matsumoto-jō), originally known as Fukashi Castle, is a castle in city of Matsumoto, Nagano Prefecture. It is one of Japan's premier historic castles, along with Himeji and Kumamoto. It was the seat of Matsumoto Domain under the Edo Period Tokugawa shogunate.

The keep (天守閣, tenshukaku), which was completed in the late sixteenth century, maintains its original wooden interiors and external stonework. It is listed as a National Treasure of Japan, and is one of the twelve surviving tenshu in Japan. It is surrounded by four other buildings also designated as National Treasures.

Matsumoto Castle is a flatland castle 平城 (hirajiro) because it is not built on a hilltop or amid rivers, but on a plain. Its complete defences would have included an extensive system of inter-connecting walls, moats, and gatehouses.

Built 50 years after the introduction of firearms in Japan, the castle is constructed with thick walls designed for gun warfare, and includes both rectangular firing windows for muskets (teppozama) as well as vertical firing windows for bows (yazama). Since 1988, the castle has been home to Matsumoto Castle Gun Museum, which hosts an exhibition on historical firearm warfare in Japan, based on a collection of guns donated to the city by Michishige Akahane, a local collector.

== History ==
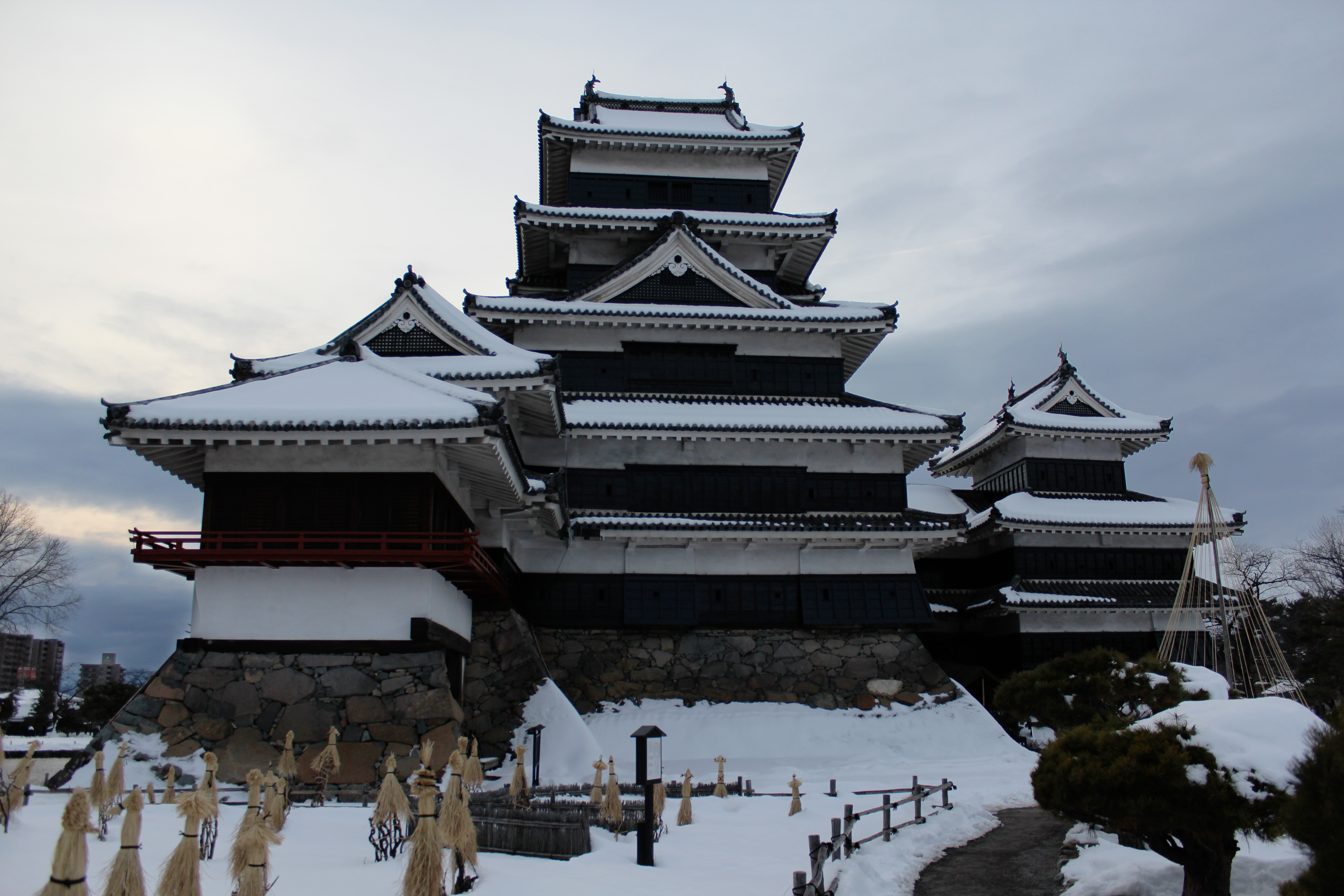
Matsumoto Castle in winter

Matsumoto Castle dates to the Sengoku period. A fortification was built at this location by the shugō of Shinano Province, Shimadachi Sadanaga of the Ogasawara clan during the Eisho era (1504–1520). This minor border post was originally called Fukashi Castle. In 1550 it was seized by the Takeda clan following the Siege of Fukashi.

Takeda Shingen appointed his retainer Baba Nobuharu as castellan. The castle was the Takeda field headquarters for their conquest of the Matsumoto Basin and as a redoubt in the constant conflict between the Takeda and the powerful Uesugi clan to the north. Following the defeat of the Takeda clan by Oda Nobunaga in 1582, the castle was surrendered to Oda Nagamasu. It was soon reassigned to Kiso Yoshimasa.

With the assassination of Oda Nobunaga in 1582, the castle was seized by Ogasawara Dosetsuzai with the backing of Uesugi Kagekatsu. His nephew, Ogasawara Sadayoshi, later pledged fealty to Tokugawa Ieyasu, and renamed the castle "Matsumoto Castle".

Following Toyotomi Hideyoshi's conquest of Odawara in 1590, Tokugawa Ieyasu was transferred from his ancestral domains to the Kantō region, and Ishikawa Kazumasa was placed in charge of Matsumoto. Kazumasa and his son Yasunaga built the tower and other parts of the castle, including the three towers: the tenshu and the small yagura in the northwest, both begun in 1590, and the Watari Yagura, the residence, the drum gate, the black gate, the Tsukimi Yagura, the moat, the innermost bailey, the second bailey, the third bailey, and the sub-floors in the castle, much as they are today. They were also instrumental in laying out the castle town and its infrastructure. It is believed much of the castle was completed by 1593–94.

During the Edo period, the Tokugawa shogunate established the Matsumoto Domain. The Ogasawara returned briefly as daimyō of Matsumoto from 1613 to 1617. They were followed by the Toda-Matsudaira clan from 1617 to 1633, Matsudaira clan from 1633 to 1638, Hotta clan from 1638 to 1642, Mizuno clan from 1642 to 1725 and by the Toda-Matsudaira clan again from 1725 to the Meiji restoration in 1868.

== Preservation ==
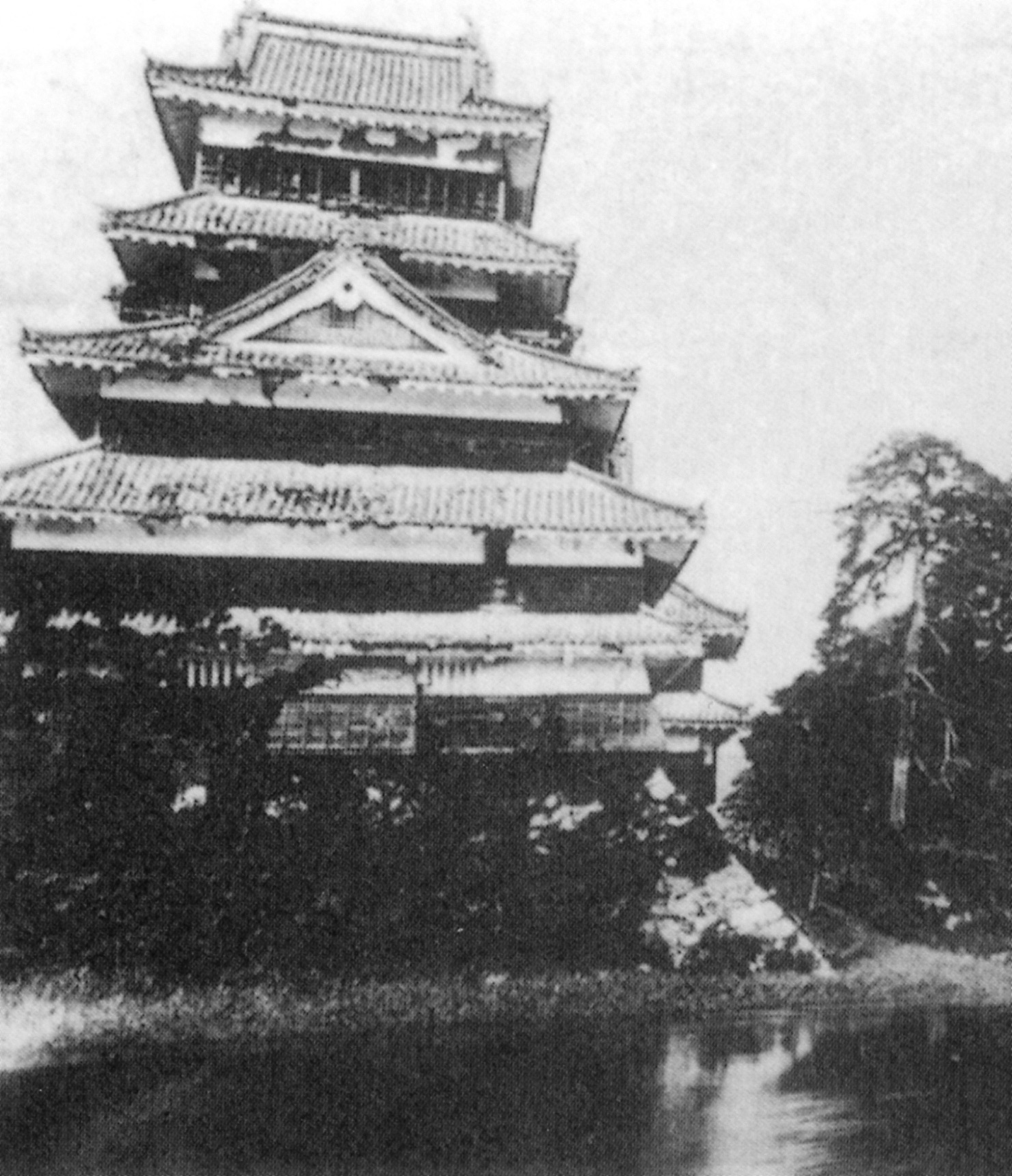
The keep, leaning, prior to 1904

In 1872, the new Meiji government ordered the destruction of all former feudal fortifications. Most of the castle structures were razed, and the outer grounds of Matsumoto Castle were sold off at auction for redevelopment. When news broke that the tenshu was going to be demolished, an influential figure from Matsumoto, Ichikawa Ryōzō, along with residents from Matsumoto, started a campaign to save the building. Their efforts were rewarded when the tower was acquired by the city government.

The daimyo residence in the Ni-no-Maru enclosure was also preserved for use as the prefectural office for Chikuma Prefecture. However, it was burned down in an act of arson in 1876, with only a storehouse dating from the end of the Edo period surviving. At the time, Chikuma and Nagano prefectures were about to be merged to form modern-day Nagano Prefecture, and there was a controversy over where to locate the prefectural capital. The loss of this building decided the location in favor of Nagano city, and the Matsumoto District Court was built on the site in 1878.

In the late Meiji period the tenshu started to lean to one side. It was because of neglect coupled with a structural defect, but many people believed the tower leaned due to the curse of Tada Kasuke. He had been caught and executed for attempting to appeal unfair tax laws (Jōkyō uprising). A local high school principal, Kobayashi Unari, decided to renovate the castle and appealed for funds. The castle underwent "the great Meiji renovation" between 1903 and 1913.

The castle was designated a National Historic Site in 1930. The five surviving original structures in the main keep complex ( Tenshu, Inui-ko-tenshu (small northern tower), Watari-yagura (roofed passage), Tatsumi-tsuke-yagura (southern wing), and Tsukimi-yagura (moon-viewing room) ) were designated as National Treasures of Japan in 1952. This enabled access to government funding for a major restoration project from 1950 to 1955, during which these buildings were dismantled and rebuilt. The surviving storehouse from the Ni-no-Maru daimyo residence also still stands in the Ni-no-Maru. The second floor of the main keep features a gun museum, Teppo Gura, with a collection of guns, armor, and other weapons.

In 1990, the Kuromon-Ninomon (second gate of the Black Gate) and sodebei (side wall) were reconstructed. The square drum gate was reconstructed in 1999. On April 6, 2006, Matsumoto Castle was selected as one of Japan's Top 100 Castles. Matsumoto Castle was damaged in a 5.4 magnitude earthquake on June 30, 2011. The earthquake caused around ten cracks in the inner wall of the main tower. There is a plan to restore the soto-bori (outer moat), which was reclaimed for a residential zone.

== Gallery ==
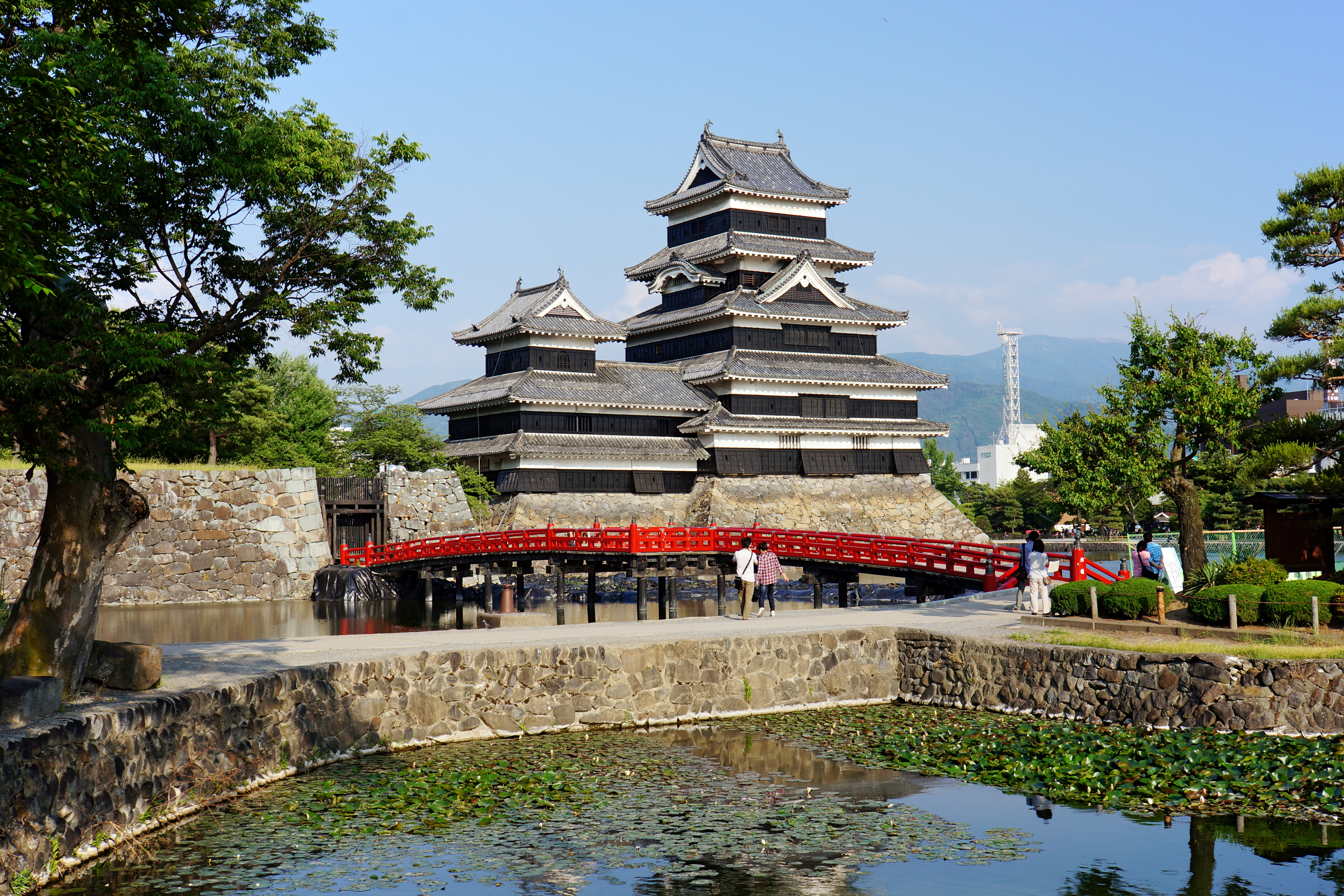
The Tenshu and Inui Kotenshu

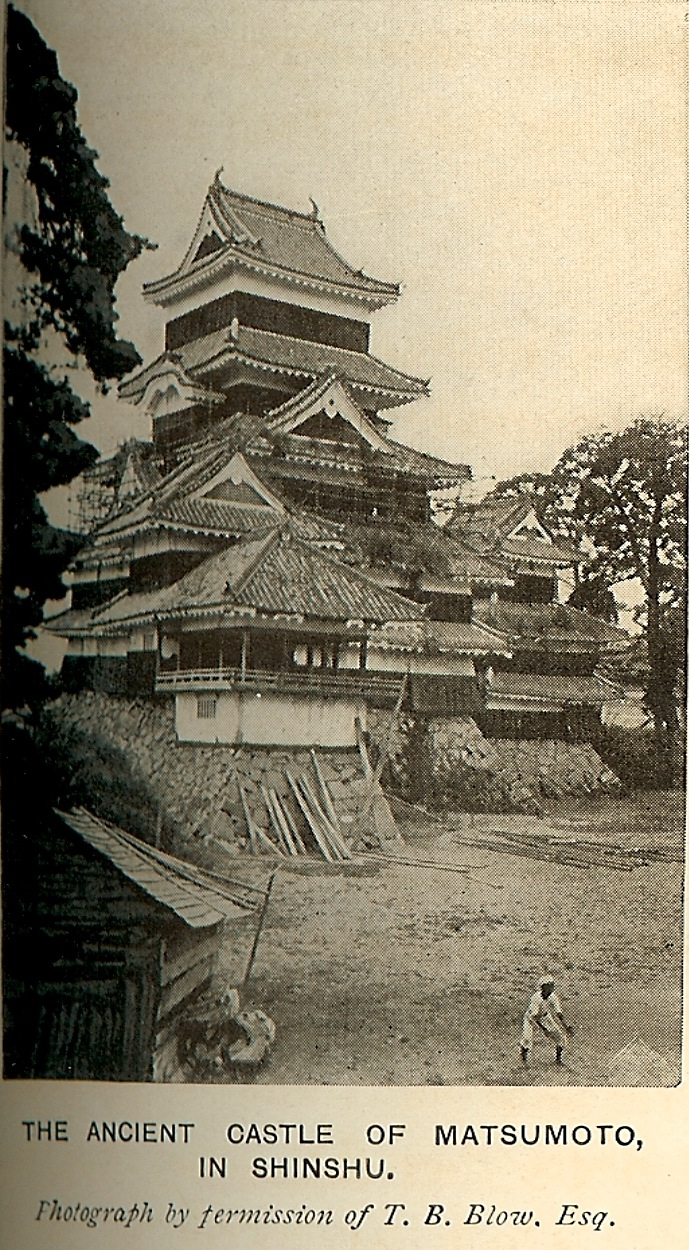
The exterior of the castle c.1910

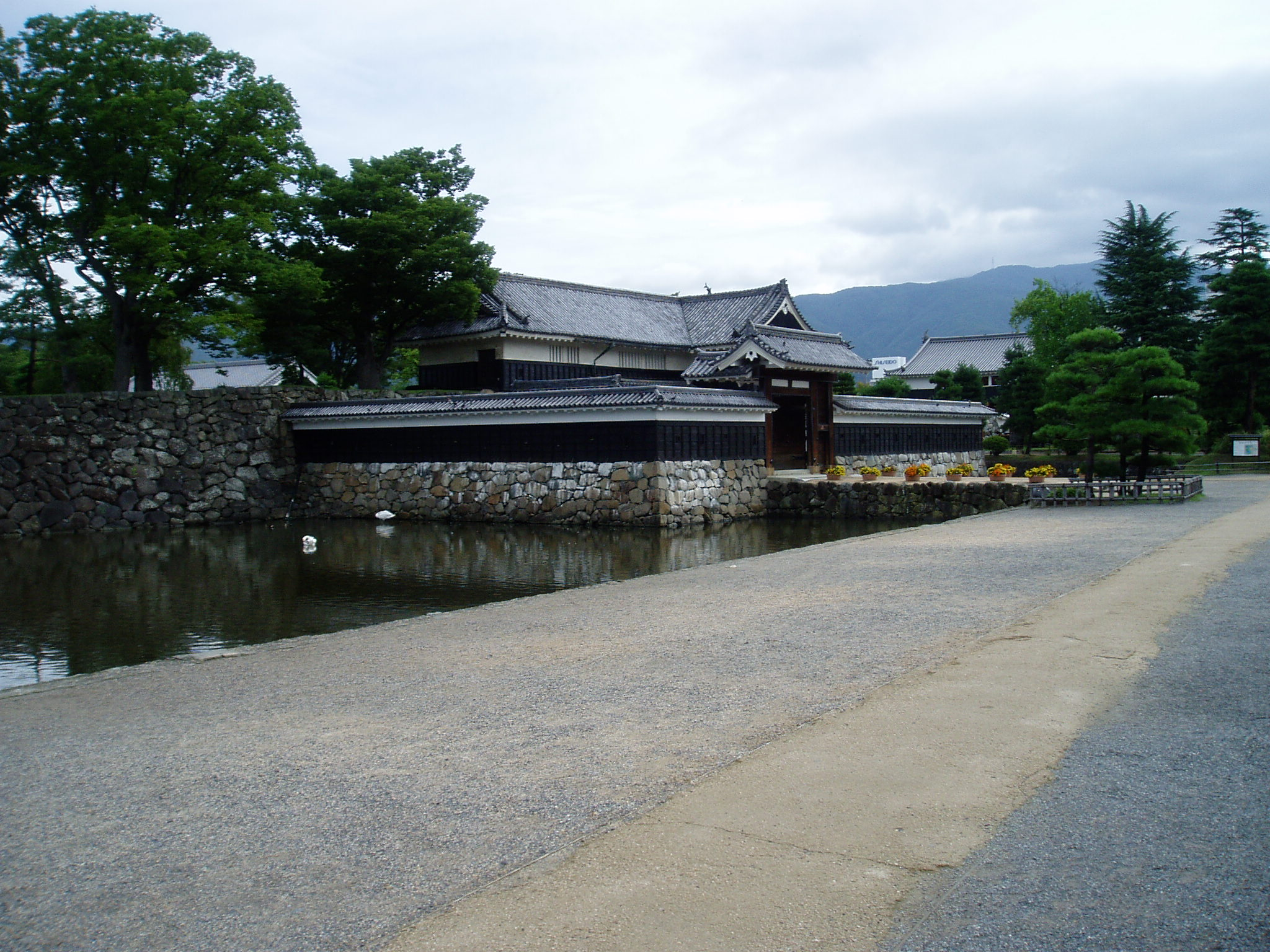
Kuromon (Black Gate)

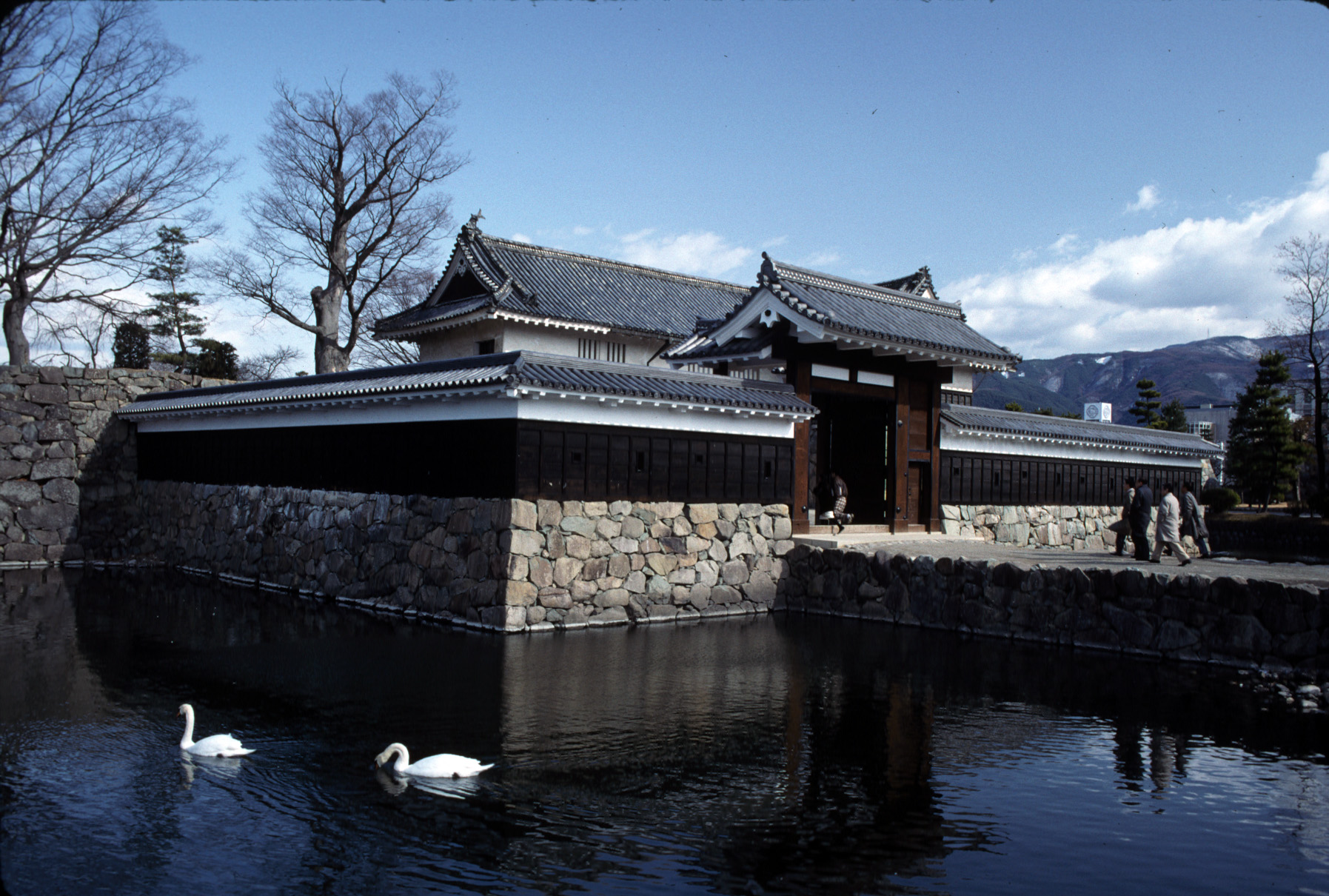
Kuromon (Black Gate), a closer view

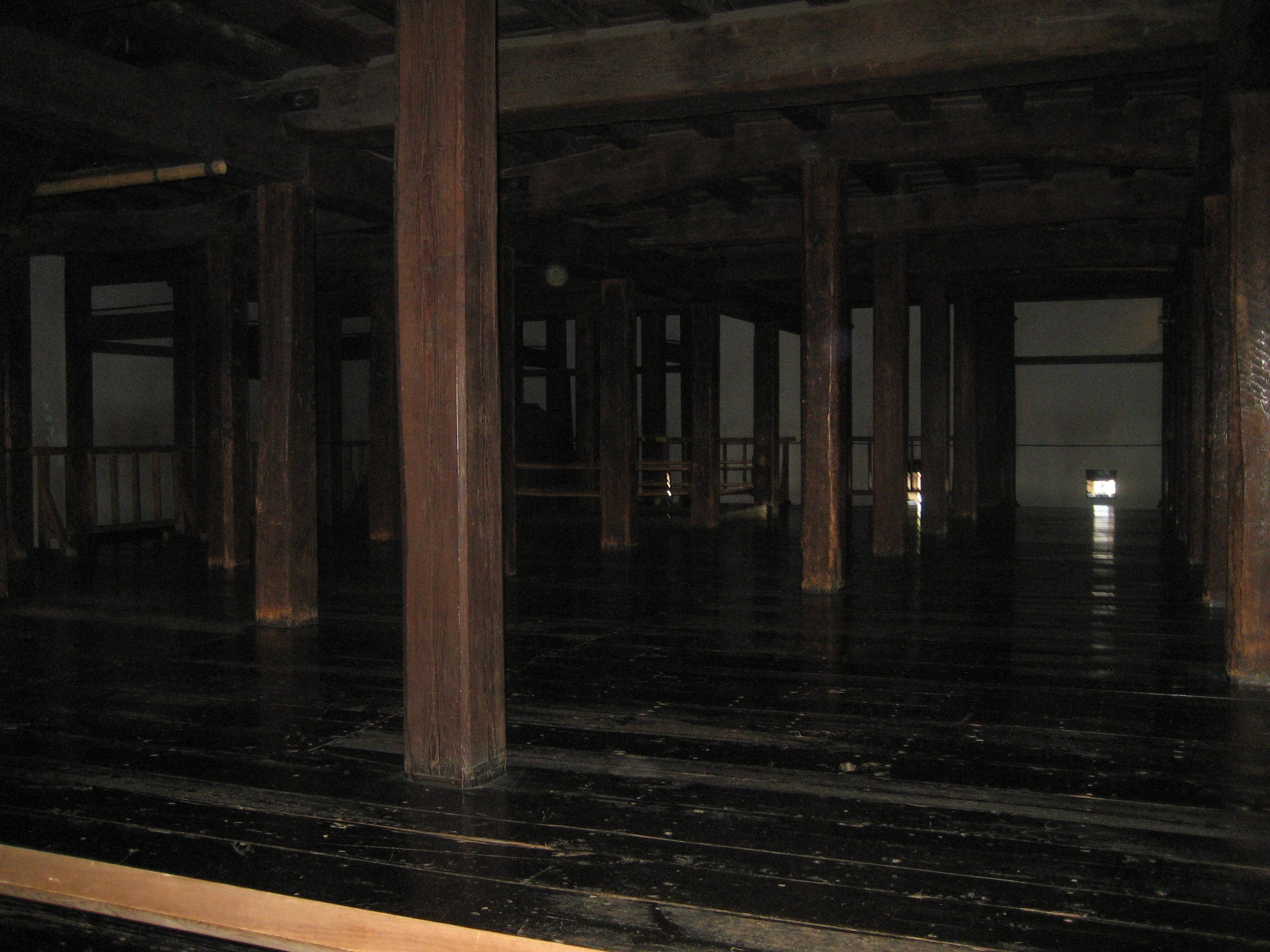
Inside Matsumoto castle

Window for firing bows

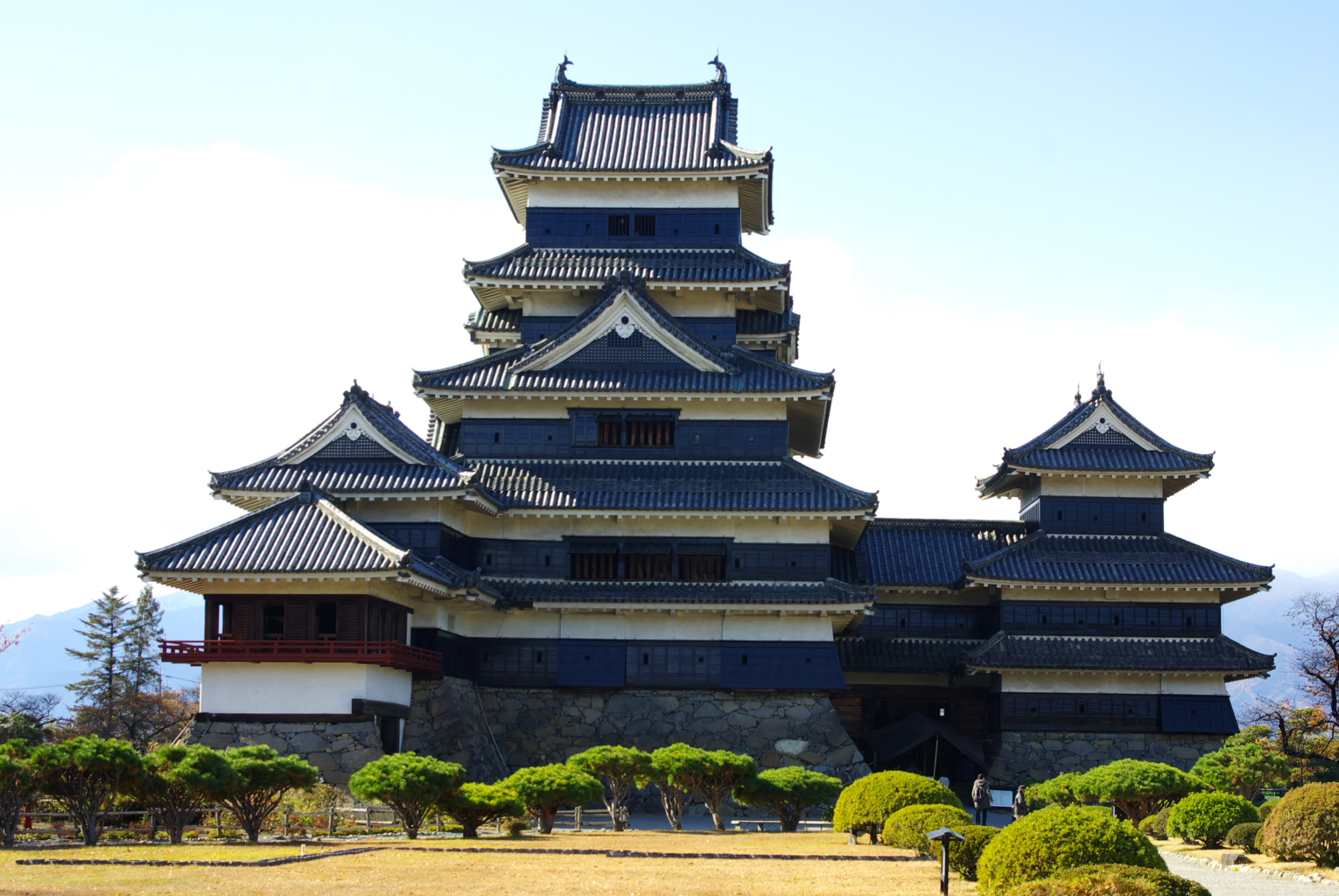
Matsumoto Castle keep complex as seen from inside the main enclosure

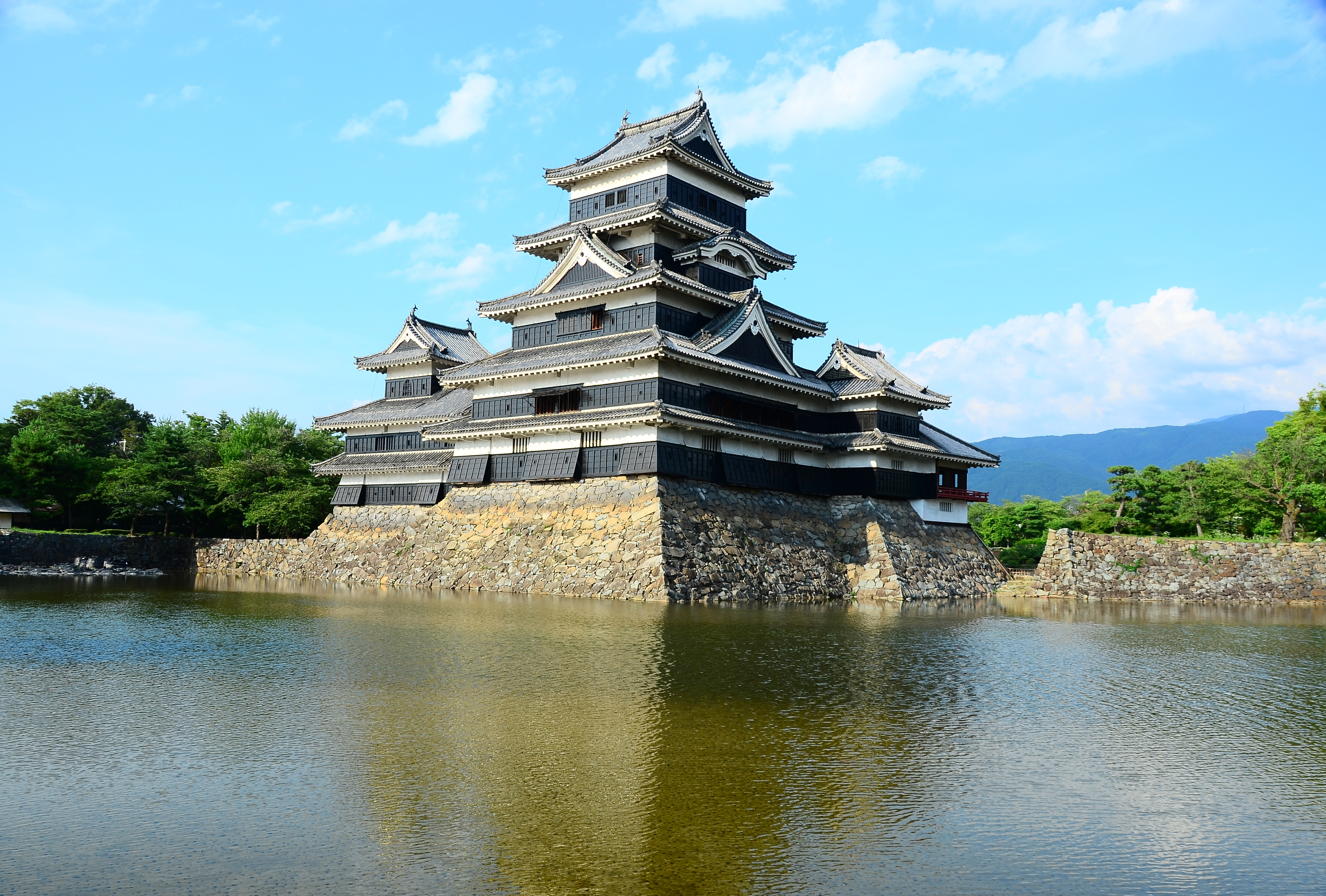
The Inui Kotenshu (left), Tenshu (center) Tatsumi Tsukeyarua (right) and moat

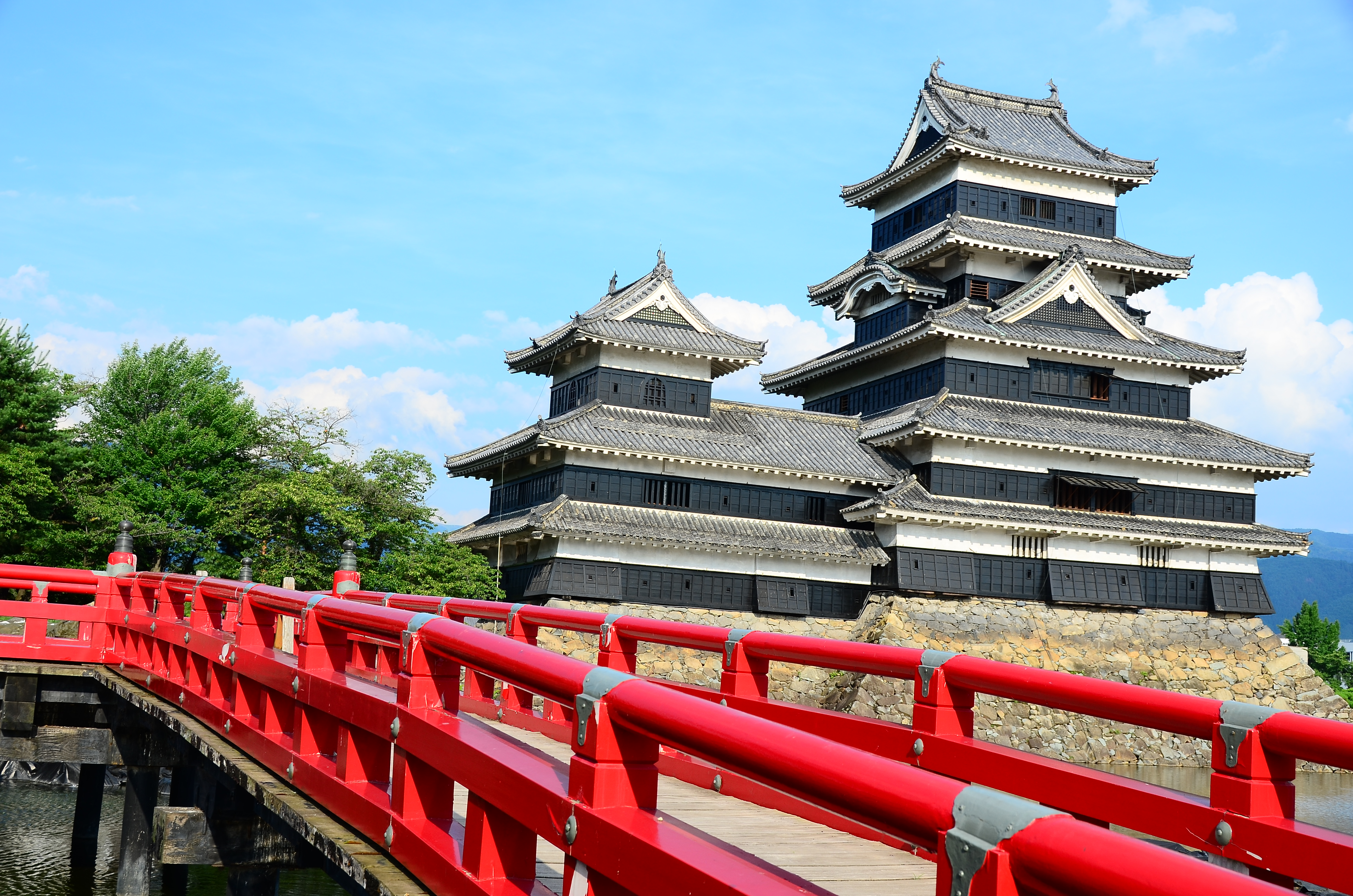
Inui Kotenshu and Tenshu as seen from the bridge

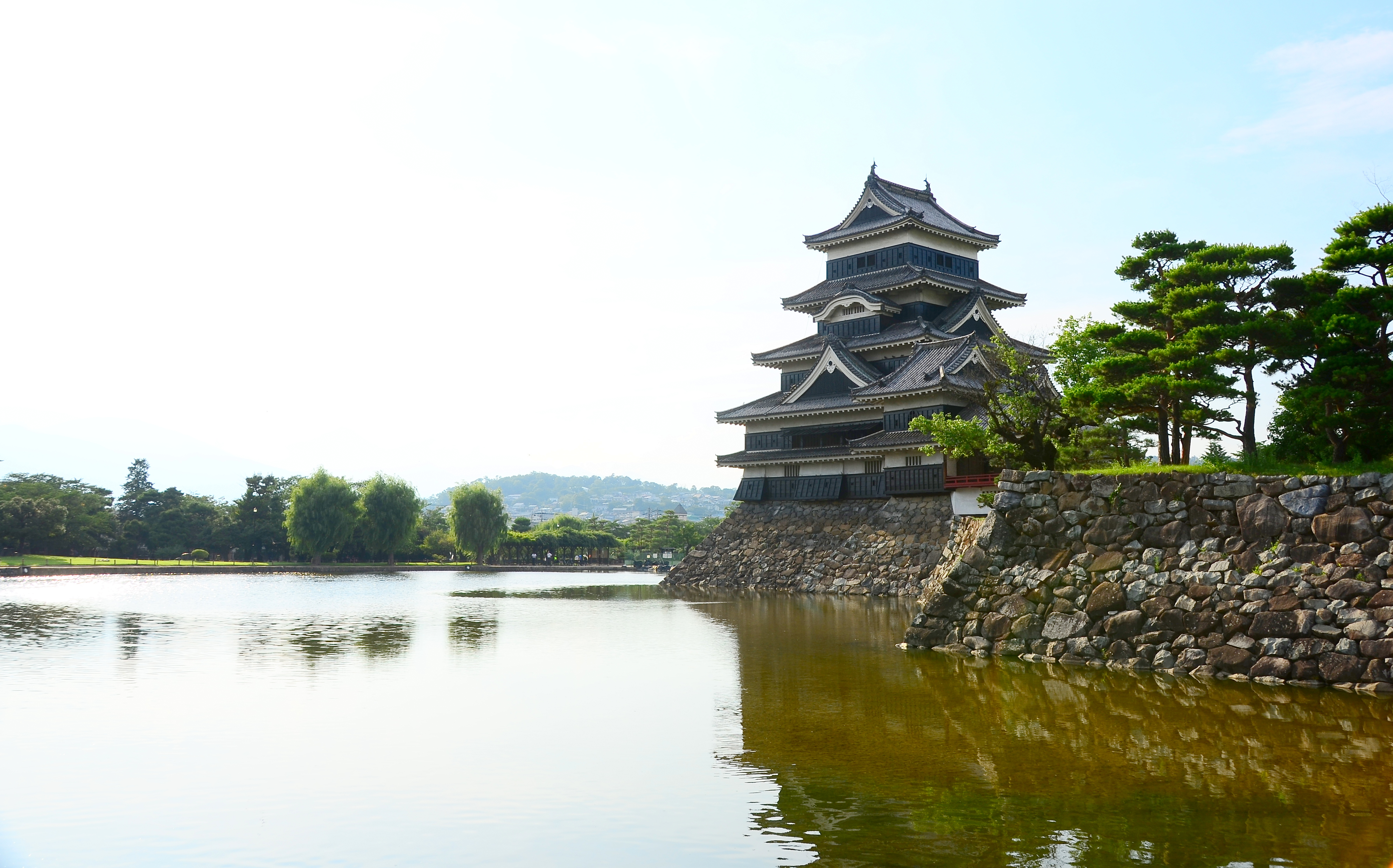
Castle view from the main gate

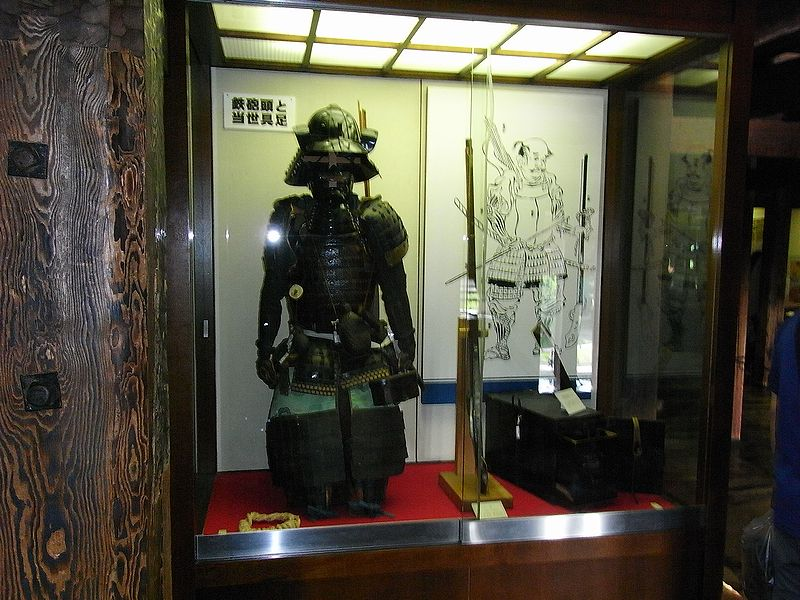

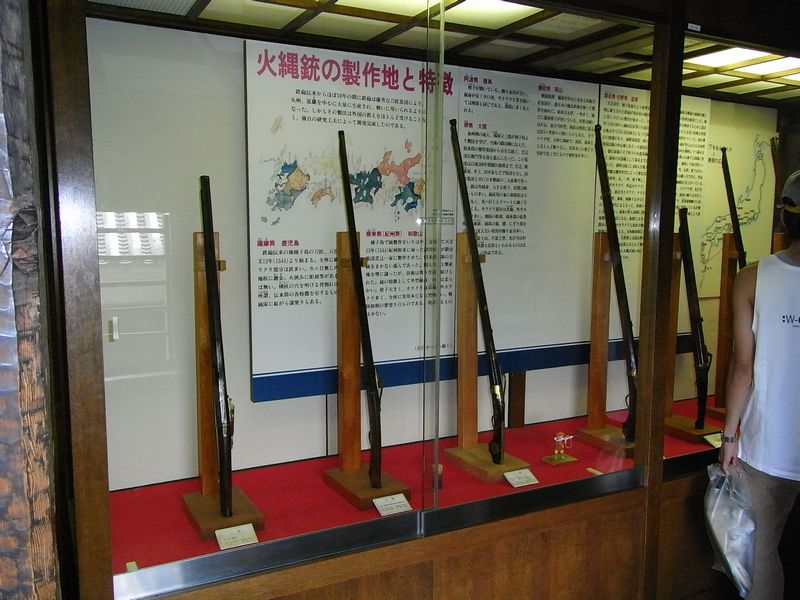

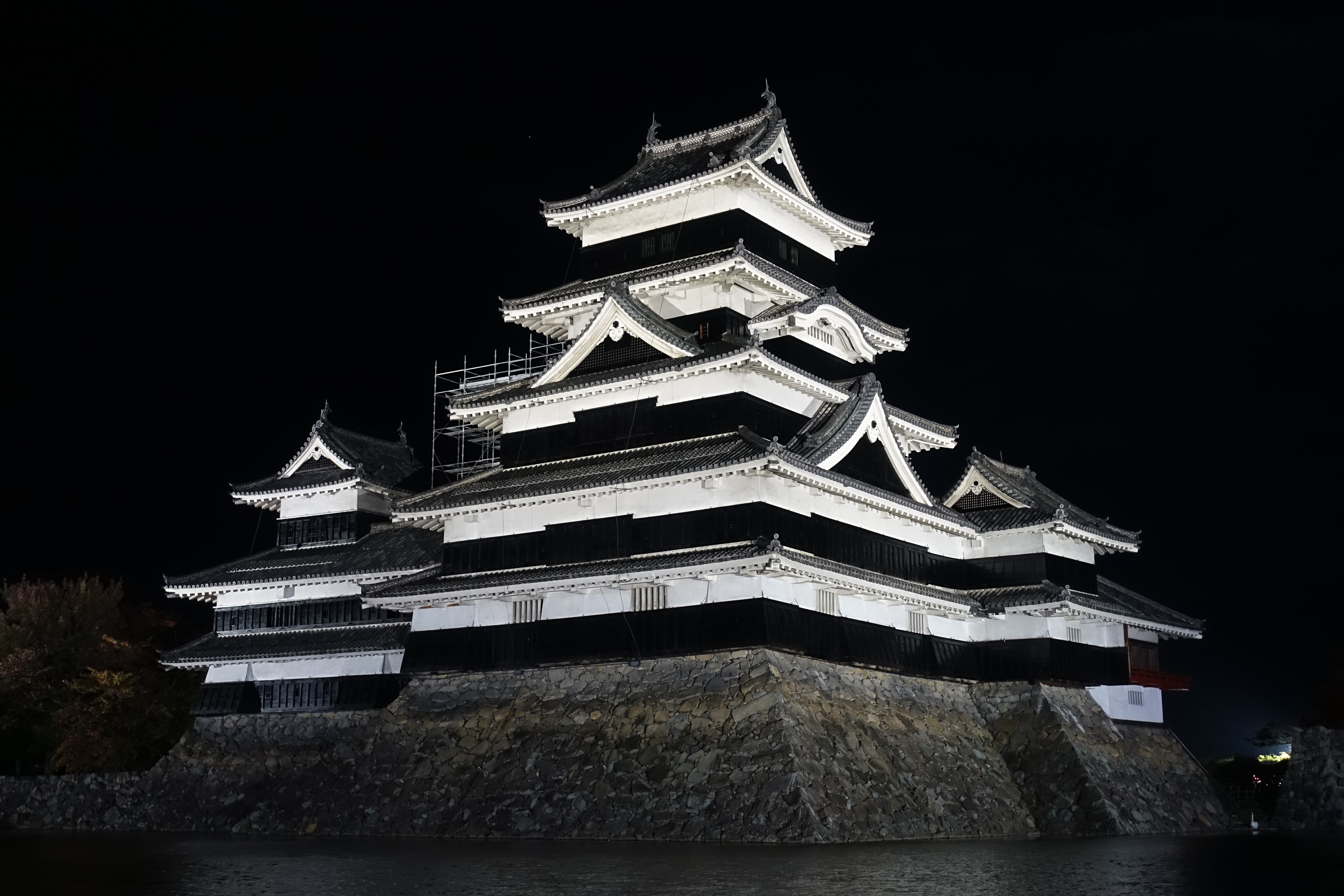
View of illuminated Matsumoto Castle

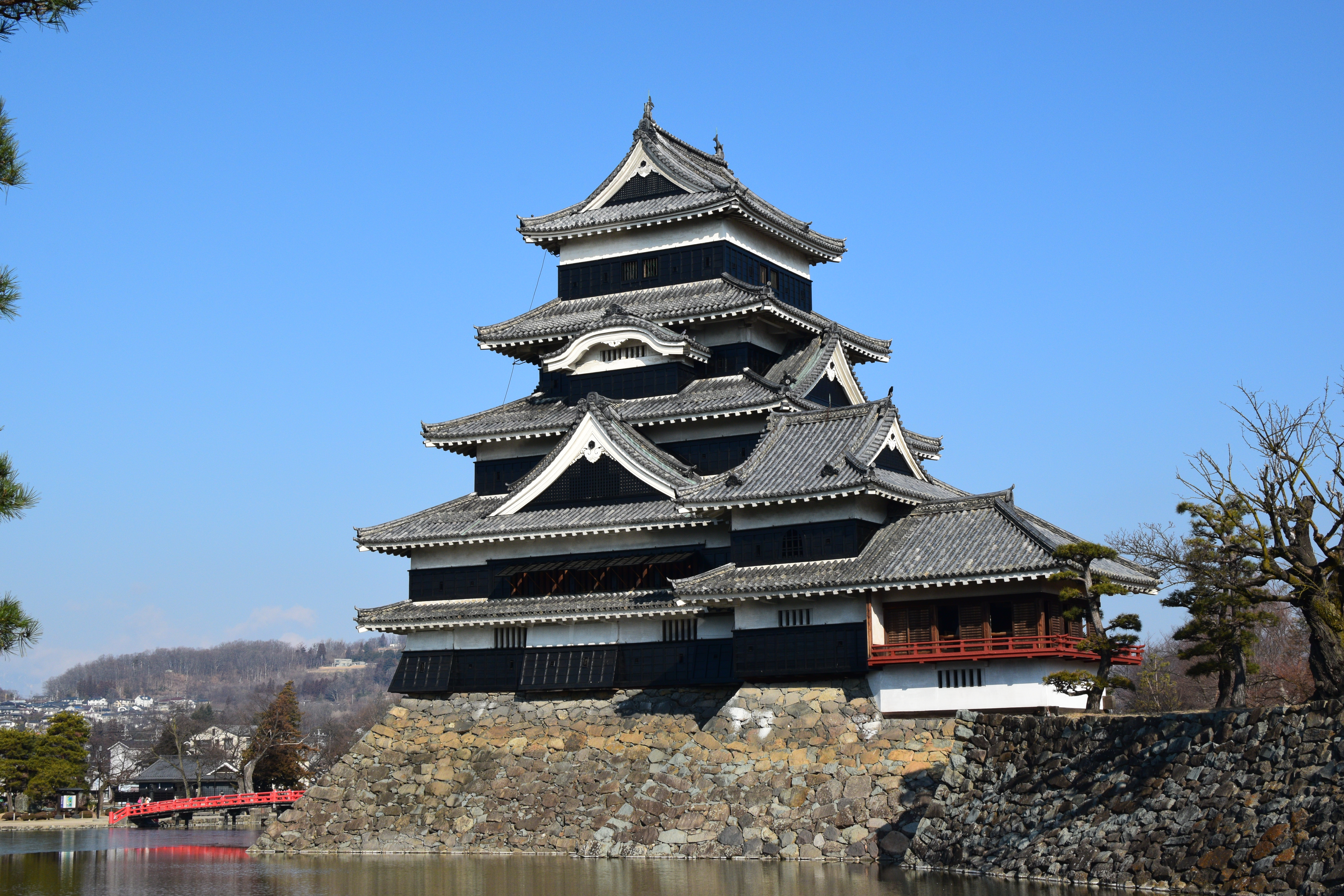

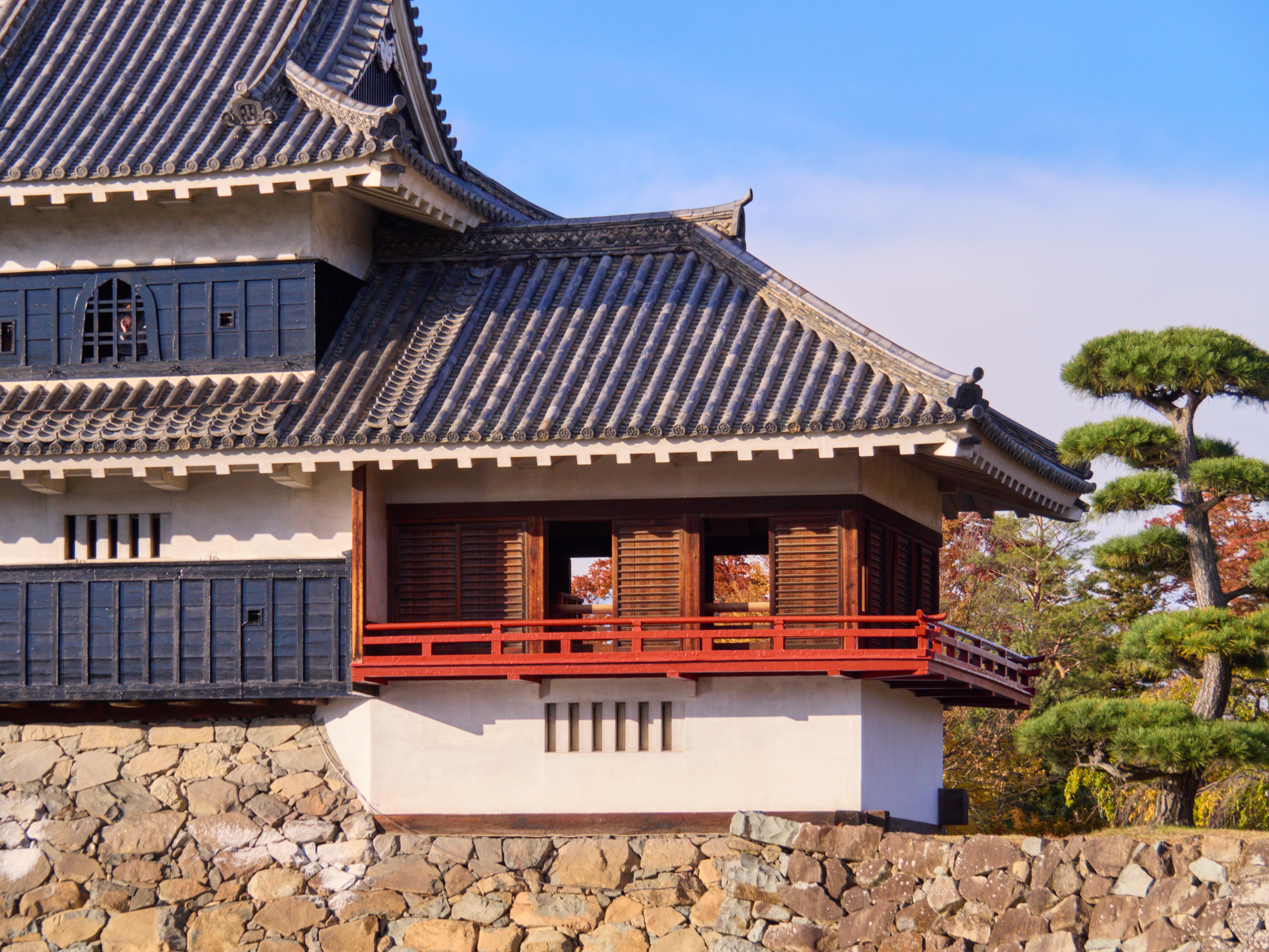
Moon-Viewing Wing of Matsumoto Castle

== See also ==
- List of National Treasures of Japan (castles)
- List of Historic Sites of Japan (Nagano)
- Tourism in Japan

== Literature ==
- Benesch, Oleg and Ran Zwigenberg (2019). Japan's Castles: Citadels of Modernity in War and Peace. Cambridge: Cambridge University Press. p. 375. ISBN 9781108481946.
- De Lange, William (2021). An Encyclopedia of Japanese Castles. Groningen: Toyo Press. pp. 600 pages. ISBN 978-9492722300.
- Mitchelhill, Jennifer (2013). Castles of the Samurai:Power & Beauty. USA: Kodansha. ISBN 978-1568365121.
- Schmorleitz, Morton S. (1974). Castles in Japan. Tokyo: Charles E. Tuttle Co. ISBN 0-8048-1102-4.
- Motoo, Hinago (1986). Japanese Castles. Tokyo: Kodansha. pp. 200 pages. ISBN 0-87011-766-1.

(In Japanese)

- Nakagawa, Haruo (2005). Zusetsu Kokuhō Matsumoto-Jō (National Treasure, Matsumoto Castle Illustrated).Issōsha Publishing
