= List of national treasures of Japan (castles) =

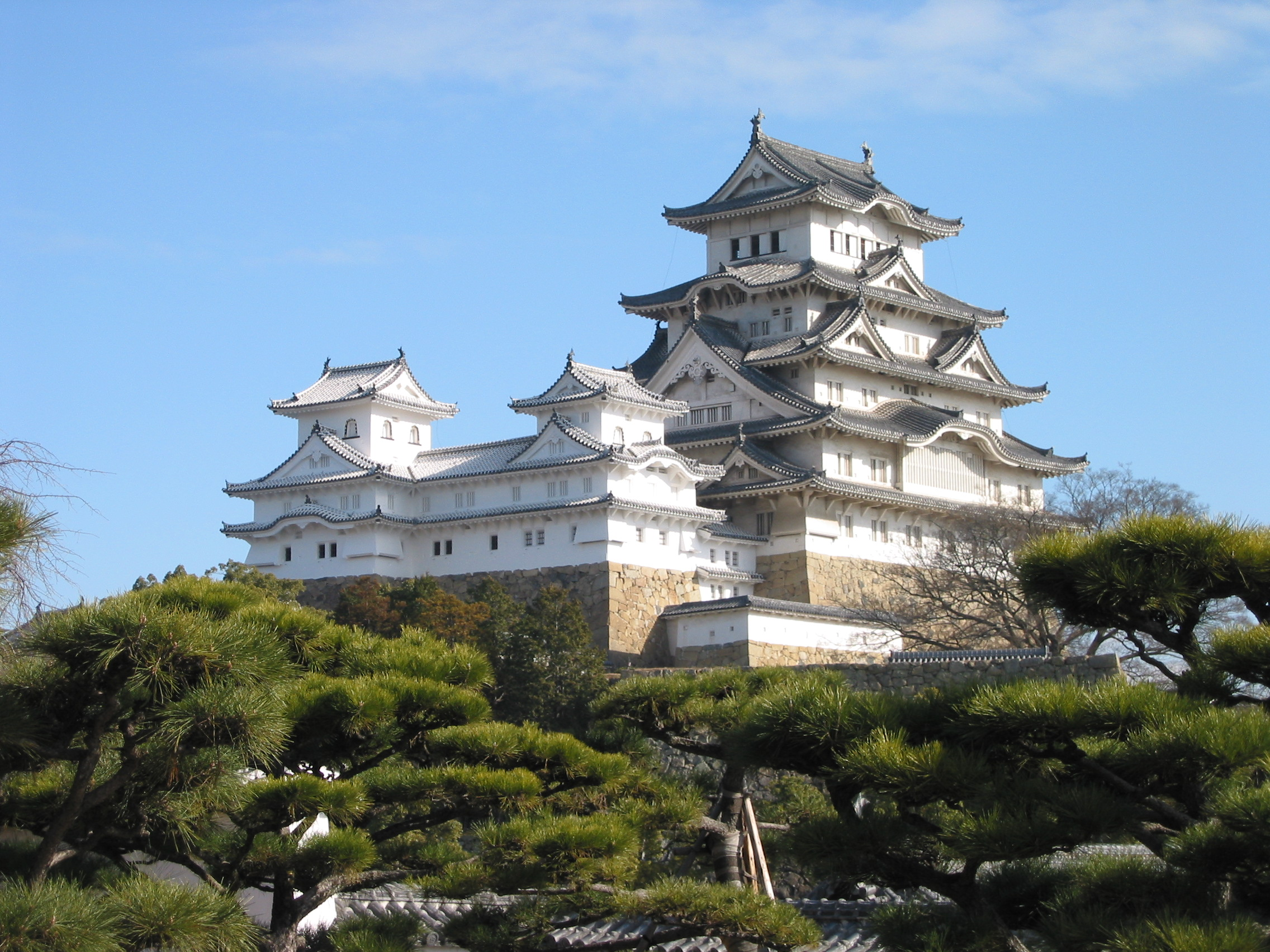
Himeji Castle is the most visited castle in Japan and a UNESCO World Heritage Site.

The Japanese Sengoku period from the mid-15th to early 17th century was a time of nearly continual military conflict. Powerful military lords known as daimyōs, such as Oda Nobunaga, Toyotomi Hideyoshi, and Tokugawa Ieyasu, struggled to unify Japan. During the Sengoku period, because of constant warfare, many fortifications and castles were built. Archetypal Japanese castle construction is a product of the Momoyama period and early Edo period.

A new era of castle construction began when the daimyo Nobunaga built Azuchi Castle from 1576 to 1579. Earlier fortifications of the Kamakura and Muromachi periods were crude large-scale structures; Azuchi, however, with rich ornamentation and a keep rising seven stories high, became the prototype for castle construction of the period. The style of Azuchi Castle marked a shift in the function of the castles from a place that was merely a fortress and military garrison to a political, cultural and economic center. The newer style castles functioned as home to the daimyōs, his family, and his most loyal retainers. Because of the expense of building such a lavish structure, castles in the style of Azuchi, functioned also to highlight the power and prestige of the daimyōs. These new castles were built of wood and plaster on a stone foundation. Generally the main keep or tenshu was positioned at the highest point, surrounded by a series of interlocking baileys with walls, small towers and pathways. Residential buildings were located in one of the outer circles. The daimyō conducted his business in the citadel.

Almost 100 major castles were built between 1596 and 1615. The peak of castle-building occurred during the years 1600 to 1615: in 1600 Tokugawa Ieyasu defeated the Toyotomi clan in the Battle of Sekigahara; and in 1615 the Toyotomi forces were finally destroyed in the siege of Osaka. The Tokugawa shogunate then limited the number of castles to one per province; and banned the building of new castles entirely in 1620. By the time of the Meiji Restoration in the late 19th century, castles were in a state of disuse and neglect. Seen as symbolic of the ruling elite of previous eras, some castles were dismantled and sold as firewood. Others were destroyed by fire, earthquake or typhoon. Only twelve castles have a donjon that is considered original.

The term "national treasure" has been used in Japan to denote cultural properties since 1897. The definition and the criteria have changed since the inception of the term. These castle structures adhere to the current definition, and were designated national treasures when the Law for the Protection of Cultural Properties was implemented on June 9, 1951. The items are selected by the Ministry of Education, Culture, Sports, Science and Technology based on their "especially high historical or artistic value". This list presents nine entries of national treasures from five castles built during the late Momoyama to early Edo period; however, the number of structures is actually more because in some cases multiple structures have been combined to form a single entry. (Note: The national treasure structures of Hikone Castle are registered as a single national treasure under one registration number. Only in the main treasure table of this article, the single entry is split in two parts for readability.) (Note: The national treasure structures of Matsumoto Castle are registered as a single national treasure under one registration number. Only in the main treasure table of this article, the single entry is split in five parts for readability.) The structures listed include donjon, watch towers and connecting galleries.

In addition to the primarily defensive structures at these five castles, there are also six structures in Nijo Castle's Ninomaru Goten complex, a fortified palace complex located in the castle’s second or outer bailey (Ninomaru) that have national treasure status. Because these palace structures are listed as residences by the Japanese cultural authorities, Nijo Castle is often not listed as a castle with national treasure structures. However, as goten (castle palaces) were the central and arguably most important feature of Japanese castles, the palace is a historical part of Nijo Castle. In spite of its residential classification, Ninomaru Goten was actually used primarily for administrative purposes. The Ninomaru Goten structures are not included in the list below.

== Features ==
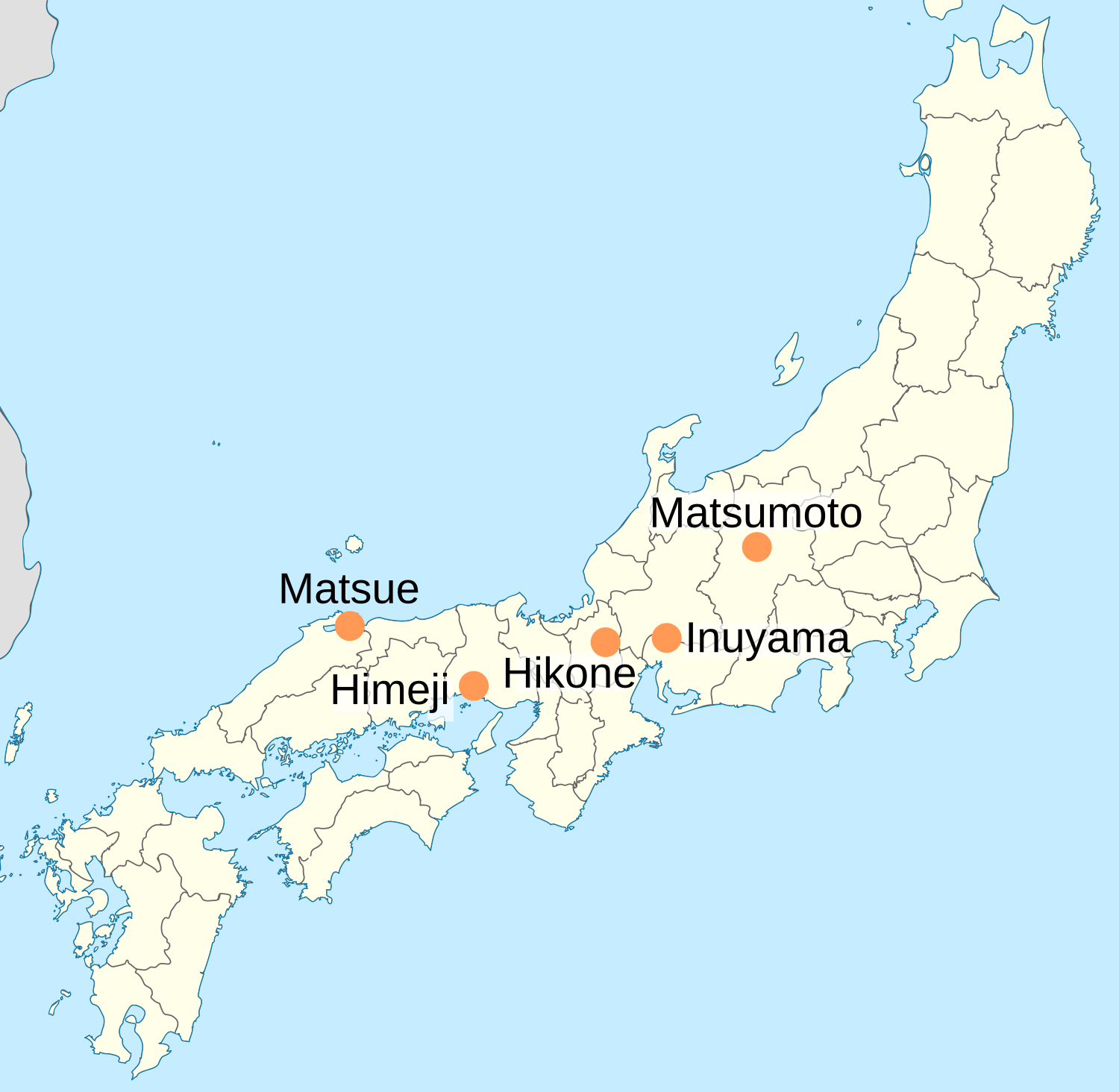
Map showing the location of castle national treasures in Japan

The nine national treasures on this list are distributed over five castles as follows: Himeji Castle has five national treasure structures; Hikone Castle, Inuyama Castle, Matsue Castle and Matsumoto Castle each have one. Three main types of castles exist. Generally the types are characterised according to the topography of the castle's site and named accordingly: mountain castles (山城, yamajiro); flatland castles (平城, hirajiro), as exemplified by Matsumoto Castle; and flatland mountain castles (平山城, hirayamajiro), which are castles built on hills in a plain such as Himeji Castle, Hikone Castle, Inuyama Castle, and Matsue Castle. The donjon can be constructed in two ways. In the older bōrōgata (望楼型) style, the top of the main keep is formed by a type of lookout tower placed on top of one or more hip-and-gable (irimoya) style roofs. Hikone Castle, Himeji Castle, Inuyama Castle and Matsue Castle are representative of this style. The sōtōgata (層塔型) style represented by the keep of Matsumoto Castle has a virtually square foundation. Each level is slightly smaller than the one below but maintains the same shape.

Only in rare cases the donjon stands independent of other structures. Generally it is connected to smaller watch towers called yagura, either directly (fukugōshiki (複合式)) or via a connecting gallery (渡櫓, watariyagura) in which case the style is called renketsushiki (連結式). Matsumoto Castle has both styles, renketsushiki in the northwest and fukugōshiki in the southeast. At Himeji Castle three watch towers, four connecting galleries and the main donjon enclose a small courtyard. A typical keep would have between three and seven stories discernible from the outside. Its inner structure including the number of floors could differ from the outward appearance. Castle towers at Himeji, Inuyama, Matsue and Matsumoto Castle have one floor more than is visible from the outside.

== Usage ==
The table's columns (except for Image) are sortable pressing the arrows symbols. The following gives an overview of what is included in the table and how the sorting works.

- Name: name of the structure as registered in the Database of National Cultural Properties
- Castle: name of the castle in which the structure is located
- Construction: architecture and general remarks including the number of stories (outside) and floors (inside); the column entries sort by the type of structure (donjon, yagura, watariyagura)
- Date: period and year of the construction; the column entries sort by year. If only a period is known, they sort by the start year of that period.
- Location: "town-name prefecture-name" and geo-coordinates of the structure; The column entries sort as "prefecture-name town-name".
- Image: picture of the structure; If the image shows more than one structure, the respective structure is indicated by a blue rectangle.

== Treasures ==
Name	Castle	Construction	Date	Location	Image
Tenshu (天守)	Hikone Castle	donjon, three stories/three floors with an underground room and entry hall, hongawarabuki roof (Note: (hongawarabuki, 本瓦葺): a tile roof composed of flat broad concave tiles and semi-cylindrical convex tiles covering the seams of the former)	Momoyama period, 1606	Hikone, Shiga; 35°16′35.21″N 136°15′6.64″E	A castle with white walls, dark roofs and many gables on a platform of unhewn stones.
Connecting tower (附櫓, tsukeyagura) and Tamon Tower (多聞櫓, tamon yagura)	Hikone Castle	yaguras, each single-storied, hongawarabuki roof	Momoyama period, 1606	Hikone, Shiga; 35°16′35.74″N 136°15′6.68″E	A single-storied structure connected to a main donjon of a castle. Both have white walls, dark roofs and are built on a platform of unhewn stones.
Big Tenshu (大天守, daitenshu)	Himeji Castle	main donjon, five stories/six floors with a one-story basement, with hongawarabuki roof; connected to the ni-corridor in the west and the i-corridor in the north (Note: The four corridors at Himeji Castle are labeled as "I", "Ro", "Ha", "Ni" corresponding to "A", "B", "C", "D".)	Momoyama period, 1608	Himeji, Hyōgo; 34°50′21.66″N 134°41′38.67″E	A large castle tower with white walls and dark roofs on a platform of unhewn stones.
Northwest Small Tower (乾小天守, inui kotenshu)	Himeji Castle	donjon three stories/four floors with a one-story basement, with hongawarabuki roof; connected to the ro-corridor in the east and the ha-corridor in the south	Momoyama period, around 1609	Himeji, Hyōgo; 34°50′22.57″N 134°41′37.72″E	A three-storied castle tower with white walls and a dark roof on a platform of unhewn stones. It is connected to a two-storied structure.
West Small Tower (西小天守, nishi kotenshu)	Himeji Castle	donjon three stories/three floors with a two-story basement, with hongawarabuki roof; connected to the ni-corridor in the east and the ha-corridor in the north	Momoyama period, around 1609	Himeji, Hyōgo; 34°50′21.83″N 134°41′37.62″E	A three-storied castle tower with white walls and a dark roof on a platform of unhewn stones. It is connected to a two-storied structure.
East Small Tower (東小天守, higashi kotenshu)	Himeji Castle	donjon three stories/three floors with a one-story basement, with hongawarabuki roof; connected to the ro-corridor in the west and the i-corridor in the south	Momoyama period, around 1609	Himeji, Hyōgo; 34°50′22.45″N 134°41′39.11″E	A small three-storied castle tower next to a large five-storied tower. Both have white walls, dark roofs and are built on a platform of unhewn stones.
I, Ro, Ha, Ni-corridors (イ, ロ, ハ, ニの渡櫓, i, ro, ha, ni no watariyagura) (Note: The kitchen is attached to the nomination.)	Himeji Castle	two stories/two floors with a one-story basement, hongawarabuki roof; I-corridor: between Big Tenshu and East Small Tower, 9.03 metres (29.6 ft) high on a 8.88 m (29.1 ft) high stone wall Ro-corridor: between East Small Tower and Northwest Small Tower, 9.03 metres (29.6 ft) high on a 8.3 m (27 ft) high stone wall Ha-corridor: between Northwest Small Tower and West Small Tower, 9.17 metres (30.1 ft) high on a 10.06 m (33.0 ft) high stone wall Ni-corridor: between West Small Tower and Big Tenshu, 9.68 metres (31.8 ft) high covering an area of 56.78 m^{2} (611.2 sq ft)	Momoyama period, around 1609	Himeji, Hyōgo; 34°50′22.06″N 134°41′38.25″E	A two-storied structure between two three-storied castle towers next to a large five-storied tower. Each has white walls, dark roofs and is built on a platform of unhewn stones. Courtyard surrounded by castle towers and lower structures.
Tenshu (天守)	Inuyama Castle	donjon, three stories/four floors with a two-story basement, ca 25 m (82 ft) high, with hongawarabuki roof. There are single-storied watchtowers with hongawarabuki roofs on the south and west side	Momoyama period, 1601	Inuyama, Aichi; 35°23′18″N 136°56′21″E	A castle with white walls and dark roofs on a base of unhewn stones.
Tenshu (天守) (Note: The national treasure structures of Matsue Castle are registered as a single national treasure under one registration number. Only in the main treasure table of this article, the single entry is split in two parts for readability.)	Matsue Castle	donjon, four stories/five floors with an underground room, hongawarabuki roof	Momoyama period, 1607–1611	Matsue, Shimane; 35°28′30.48″N 133°3′2.57″E	Main keep of a castle with dark walls, dark roofs on a platform of unhewn stones.
Connecting tower (附櫓, tsukeyagura)	Matsue Castle	yagura, one story/one floor, hongawarabuki roof	Momoyama period, 1607–1611	Matsue, Shimane; 35°28′29.86″N 133°3′2.71″E	Small tower attached to a castle with dark walls, dark roofs on a platform of unhewn stones.
Tenshu (天守)	Matsumoto Castle	main donjon, five stories/six floors, with hongawarabuki roof	Momoyama period, Bunroku era	Matsumoto, Nagano; 36°14′19.03″N 137°58′7.87″E	A large 5-storied castle tower with black wooden walls located on a platform of unhewn stones surrounded on two sides by water. The tower is connected to lower structure on two sides.
Northwest Small Tower (乾小天守, inui Kotenshu)	Matsumoto Castle	secondary donjon, three stories/four floors, hongawarabuki roof	Momoyama period, Bunroku era	Matsumoto, Nagano; 36°14′19.66″N 137°58′7.81″E	A 3-storied castle tower with black wooden walls located on a platform of unhewn stones above a water filled moat. The tower is connected to a lower structure on one sides.
Connecting Tower (渡櫓, watari yagura)	Matsumoto Castle	yagura, two stories/two floors, hongawarabuki roof	Momoyama period, Bunroku era	Matsumoto, Nagano; 36°14′19.42″N 137°58′7.8″E	A 2-storied structure connecting a 3-storied castle tower with a 5-stoired tower. All three structures have black wooden walls and are located on a platform of unhewn stones above a water filled moat.
Southeast Connecting Tower (辰巳附櫓, tatsumi tsukeyagura)	Matsumoto Castle	yagura, two stories/two floors, hongawarabuki roof	Momoyama period, Bunroku era	Matsumoto, Nagano; 36°14′18.76″N 137°58′8.32″E	A two-storied tower connected on one side to a five-storied castle tower and on the other to a lower one-storied structure. All three structures have black wooden walls and are located on a platform of unhewn stones.
Moon-viewing Tower (月見櫓, tsukimi yagura)	Matsumoto Castle	yagura, one-storied with one-storied basement, hongawarabuki roof	early Edo period, Kan'ei era	Matsumoto, Nagano; 36°14′18.77″N 137°58′8.63″E	A one-storied structure with a veranda with red handrail connected to a two-storied castle tower. Both are located on a platform of unhewn stones.

== See also ==
- Japanese castle
- 100 Fine Castles of Japan

== Notes ==
General

Architecture

== Bibliography ==
- Cluzel, Jean-Sébastien (2008). Architecture éternelle du Japon – De l'histoire aux mythes (illustrated ed.). Editions Faton. ISBN 978-2-87844-107-9.
- Coaldrake, William Howard (1996). Architecture and authority in Japan. Nissan Institute/Routledge Japanese studies (illustrated ed.). Routledge. ISBN 978-0-415-05754-7.
- Deal, William E. (2007) [1973]. Handbook to life in medieval and early modern Japan (illustrated, revised ed.). New York: Oxford University Press. ISBN 978-0-19-533126-4.
- Nishi, Kazuo; Hozumi, Kazuo (1996) [1983]. What is Japanese architecture? (illustrated ed.). Kodansha International. ISBN 978-4-7700-1992-9.
- Turnbull, Stephen; Dennis, Peter (2003). Japanese castles 1540–1640. Fortress Series. Vol. 5. Osprey Publishing. ISBN 978-1-84176-429-0.
