= Sagiyama Castle =

Japanese castle

Coordinates: 35°26′58.79″N 136°45′3.22″E

- 鷺山城
- Gifu, Gifu Prefecture, Japan
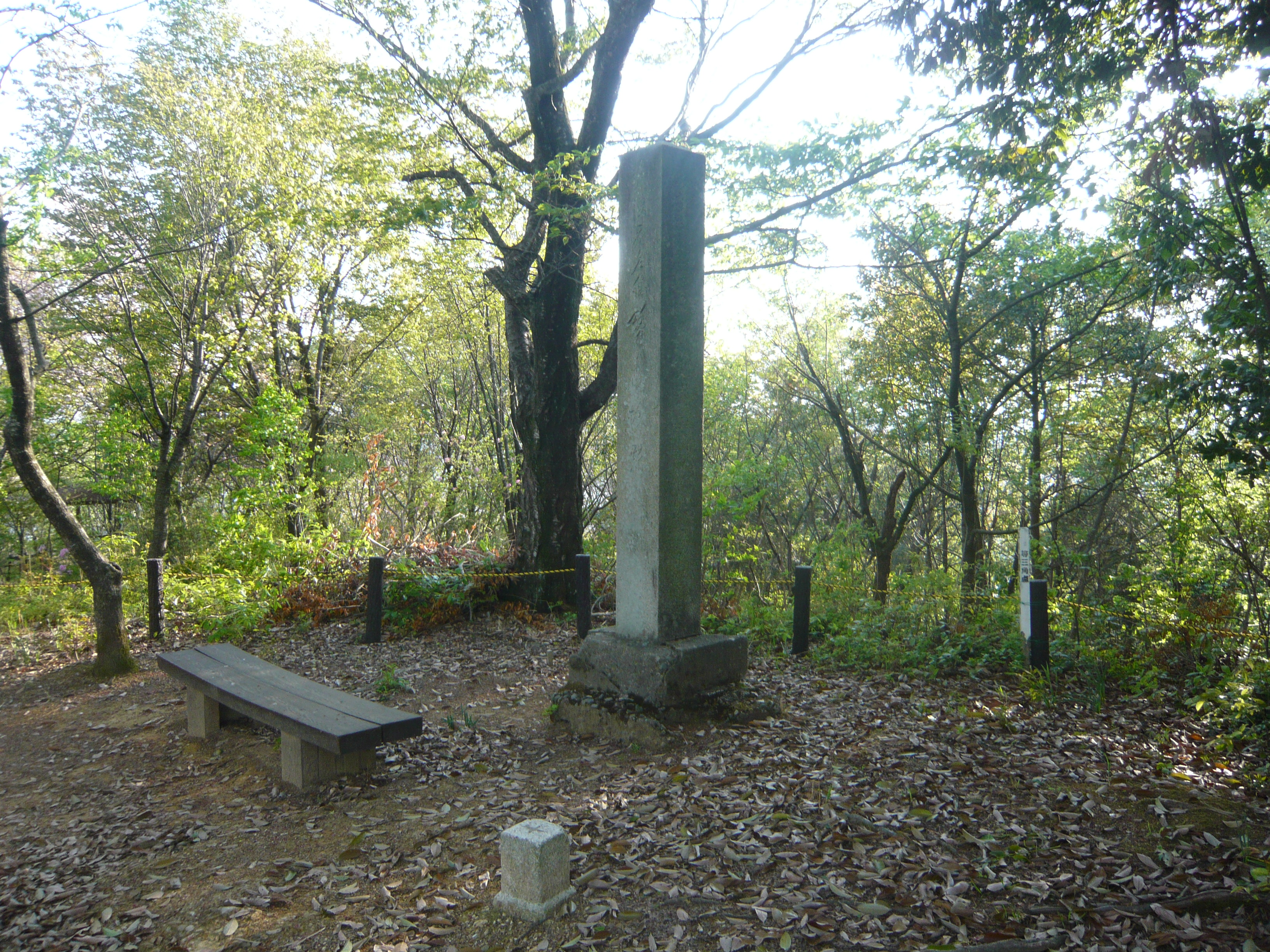
- Stone marker for Sagiyama Castle

Site information
- Type: Mountaintop castle

Location

Site history
- Built: ca. 1185
- Built by: Satake Hideyoshi
- In use: 12th to 16th centuries
- Demolished: 1556

Garrison information
- Past commanders: Saitō Dōsan, Saitō Yoshitatsu
- Occupants: Toki clan, Saitō clan

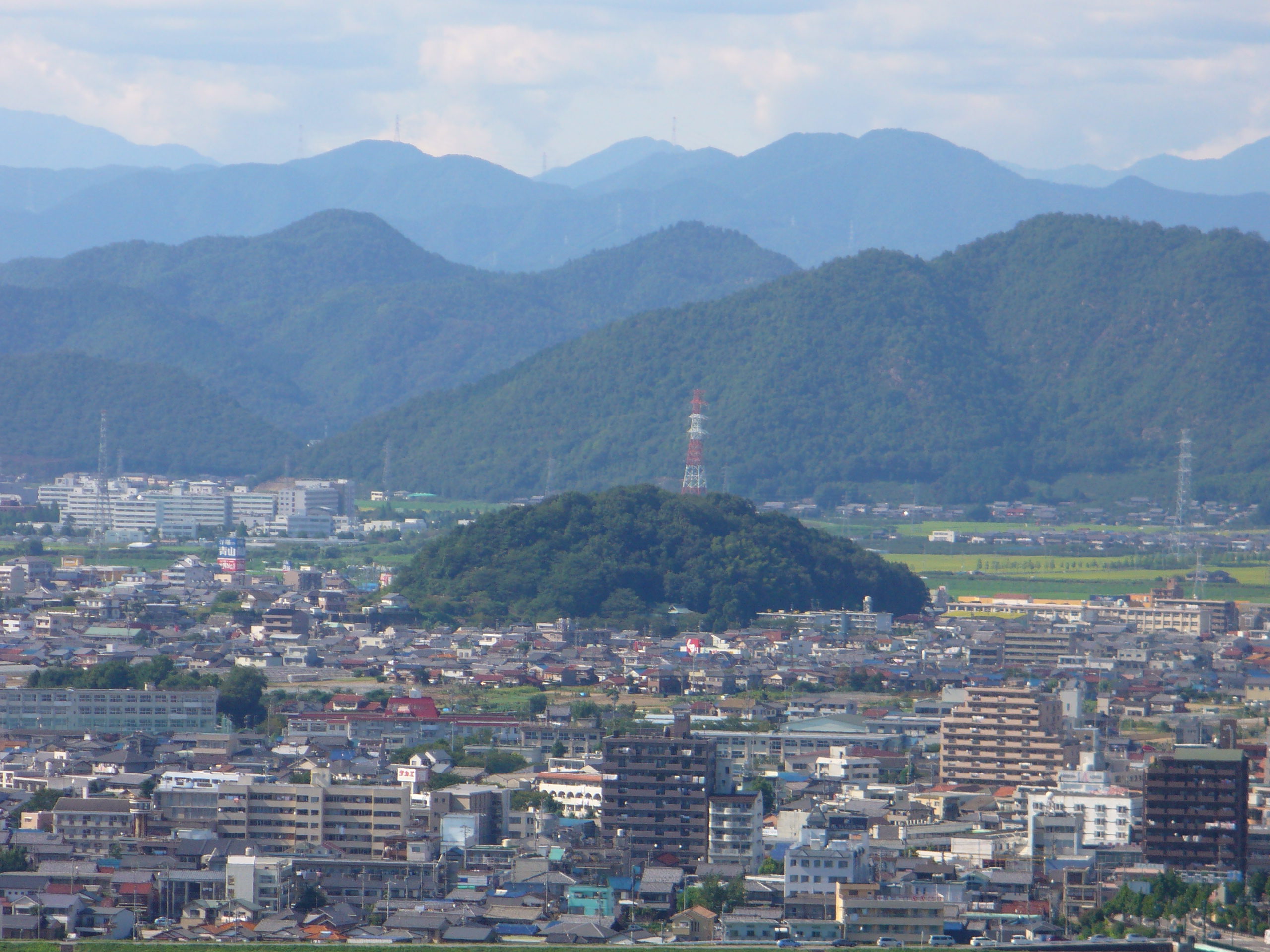
Mount Sagi

Sagiyama Castle (鷺山城, Sagiyama-jō) was a castle built in Mino Province in middle Japan during the late-Heian period (late 12th century); it was destroyed during the Sengoku period in the mid-16th century. The castle's ruins are located in the present-day city of Gifu, Gifu Prefecture. It stood at the peak of Mount Sagi, which was only 68 m (223 ft). Because the castle was built as a residence and not a defensive fortress, its location on a small mountain was of little consequence.

== History ==
Sagiyama Castle was built by Satake Hideyoshi between 1185 and 1190. It served as a main castle for the Toki clan, who were the shugo of Mino Province at the time, at first. However, after the construction of Kawate Castle to the south in 1353, Sagiyama Castle no longer played an important role in the area. Toki Yorinari moved into the castle in the early 16th century, but chose to live in Kawate Castle after becoming the shugo.

After Saitō Dōsan usurped power from the Toki clan in 1530, he moved the area's power into Inabayama Castle atop Mount Kinka. However, he occasionally took refuge in Sagiyama Castle because of its ease of access. Dōsan gave possession of Sagiyama Castle to his son, Saitō Yoshitatsu, in 1548 after some repairs. Originally, Dōsan was planning on naming Yoshitatsu as his successor, but when Yoshitatsu heard that Dōsan might choose another son, Yoshitatsu killed his two brothers. The murders led to the Battle of Nagaragawa between Dōsan and Yoshitatsu in 1556, which resulted in Dōsan's death and the destruction of the castle.

== Present ==
In the modern era the site of Sagiyama Castle is preserved as a historic park, and a number of its earthworks — including low earthen ramparts and traces of moats — remain visible on Mount Sagi (鷺山). 岐阜の旅ガイ ド攻城団

In 1964, during large civil-engineering projects for the opening of the Tōkaidō Shinkansen and the construction of the Meishin (名神) Expressway, portions of Mount Sagi were quarried for fill material; this work reduced the size of the hill. During those excavations, workers recovered stones that have been interpreted as foundation stones (礎石) thought to be associated with the former castle structures. mori70shiro.dousetsu.com 歴史探索

Although parts of the mountain were cut away, the remaining castle site is protected and interpreted locally: a stone marker (城址碑) stands near the summit and the area is managed as Sagiyama Park, where visitors can still see sections of the surviving embankments and moats. 岐阜の旅ガイド登山とアウトドアの情報サイト／▴ヤマニア.net
