= Toki (name) =

Toki is a given name and surname.

== People with the name ==
People with the name include:

- Toki, son of Wigod, Englishman in the service of William the Conqueror
- Asako Toki (土岐 麻子; born 1976), Japanese singer-songwriter and lyricist
- Gōnoyama Tōki (豪ノ山 登輝; Tōki Nishikawa, born 1998), Japanese sumo wrestler
- Luke Toki (born 1986), Australian television personality
- Nicola Toki New Zealand conservationist
- Rose Toki-Brown (born 1976) Cook Islands politician, and Cabinet Minister
- Shuichi Toki (born 1964) Japanese equestrian
- Shun'ichi Toki (土岐 隼一; born 1989), Japanese voice actor and singer
- Tatsuo Toki (斎 辰雄; 1904–1967), Japanese decathlete
- Valmaine Toki, New Zealand barrister and solicitor
- Zenmaro Toki (土岐 善麿; 1885–1980), Japanese Naturalist tanka poet
- Toki Ginjiro (土岐 銀次郎; 1894–1976), Japanese Governor of Toyama and Saitama Prefecture
- Toki Jurozayemon Mitsuchika (登喜十郎左衛門光隣; died 1582), Japanese retainer of the Akechi clan and relative of Akechi Mitsuhide
- Toki Masafusa (土岐 政房; 1467–1519), Japanese samurai warrior
- Toki Mabogunje (fl. 2000s), Nigerian lawyer, broadcaster, poet and business consultant
- Toki Pilioko (born 1995) French rugby player and actor
- Toki Shigeyori (土岐 成頼; 1442–1497), Japanese leading military commander
- Tōki Susumu (闘牙 進; born 1974), Japanese sumo wrestler
- Toki Tamaru (田丸 辰; born 2002), Japanese kickboxer
- Toki Wright (born 1980) American rapper
- Toki Yorinari (土岐 頼芸; 1502–1582), Japanese samurai warrior
- Toki Yoritoshi (土岐 頼稔; 1695–1744), Japanese daimyō
- Toki Yukutomo (行友 翔哉; born 2005), Japanese footballer

== Fictional characters ==
- Kamen Rider Tōki, a fictional character in Kamen Rider Hibiki
- Princess Toki, a character in Naruto
- Toki, the second of the four brothers of Hokuto Shinken in Fist of the North Star
- Toki, a character from Hayao Miyazaki's 1997 animated film Mononoke Hime
- Toki Fujiwara, a character in the anime Code:Breaker
- Toki Wartooth, the rhythm guitarist of the metal band Dethklok in Metalocalypse
- Toki, a character in Canimals
