= Toki =

Toki may refer to:

== People ==
- Toki (name), including a list of people and fictional characters with the given name or surname
- Toki clan, a Japanese samurai clan
- Toqui, or Toki, the title of the leader of the Mapuche during a time of war

== Places ==
- Toki, Gifu, Japan
- Toki, Podkarpackie Voivodeship, in south-east Poland
- Toki, Masovian Voivodeship, in east-central Poland

== Other uses ==
- TOKİ, Turkey's government-backed housing agency
- "Toki" (song), by Casper Mágico, Anuel AA, Luar la L and iZaak, 2024
- Toki (train), a train service in Japan
- Toki (video game), 1989
- Toki (whiskey), a brand of Japanese whiskey by Suntory
- Toki, Japanese name of the Crested ibis
- Toki, a cultivar of Japanese apple
- Toki, the word for speech/language and hello in Toki Pona, a constructed language
- Toki, a company by Rob Monster to distribute servers to Africa and Asia

== See also ==
- Palnatoke, or Palna Toki, legendary Danish hero
