= Nagamori Castle =

Coordinates: 35°23′52″N 136°47′57″E

Nagamori Castle 長森城
- Gifu, Gifu Prefecture, Japan

Location
- Location within Gifu Prefecture Location within Japan

Site history
- Built: 1185
- Built by: Tosanobō Shōshun
- In use: 1185–late-16th century
- Demolished: late-16th century

Nagamori Castle (長森城, Nagamori-jō) was a castle built in Mino Province, Japan, by Tosanobō Shōshun (土佐坊昌俊), in 1185, and lasted from the Heian period to the early Sengoku period. It is located in the Kiridōshi area of the city of Gifu, Gifu Prefecture, Japan. After the castle was dismantled in the beginning of the Sengoku period, the Kiridōshi Jin'ya was built on the same spot. It served as the base for the area shugo until the construction of Kawate Castle nearby.

== History ==
Tosanobō Shōshun served as the jito of the area during the late 12th century.

During the Nanboku-chō period, Toki Yoritō served as the shugo of Mino Province. In 1339, he moved his base from the present-day city of Toki to Nagamori Castle. The castle only remained in the hands of the Toki clan for a short time, however, as Toki Yoriyasu built the more spacious Kawate Castle nearby to serve as the new base of operations.

It is unclear when the castle was demolished, but it is known that Saitō Dōsan chose to use Inabayama Castle as his base when he gained control of the area.
