= List of cultural properties of Japan – paintings (Gifu) =

This list is of the cultural properties of Japan designated in the category of paintings (絵画, kaiga) for the Prefecture of Gifu.

== National Cultural Properties ==
As of 1 February 2016, nine Important Cultural Properties have been designated (including one *National Treasure), being of national significance.

Property	Date	Municipality	Ownership	Comments	Image	Dimensions	Coordinates	Ref.
*The Five Wisdom Kings, colour on silk 絹本著色五大尊像 kenpon chakushoku godaison zō	Heian period	Ōno	Kiburi-ji (来振寺)	five scrolls (Gōzanze Myōō pictured)			35°29′56″N 136°39′05″E	
Saitō Dōsan, colour on silk Saitō Yoshitatsu, colour on silk 絹本著色斎藤道三像 絹本著色斎藤道三像 kenpon chakushoku Saitō Dōsan zō kenpon chakushoku Saitō Yoshitatsu zō	Muromachi period	Gifu	Jōzai-ji			96.9 centimetres (38.1 in) by 45.8 centimetres (18.0 in); 73.9 centimetres (29.1 in) by 34.3 centimetres (13.5 in)	35°25′56″N 136°46′15″E	
Senju Kannon, colour on silk 絹本著色千手観音像 kenpon chakushoku Senju Kannon zō	Southern Song	Tajimi	Eihō-ji			191.0 centimetres (75.2 in) by 105.8 centimetres (41.7 in)	35°20′48″N 137°07′49″E	
Nude, oil on canvas, by Yamamoto Hōsui 裸婦図〈山本芳翠筆／油絵 麻布〉 rafu zu (Yamamoto Hōsui hitsu abura-e mafu)	c. 1880	Gifu	Gifu Prefecture (kept at the Museum of Fine Arts, Gifu)			83.0 centimetres (32.7 in) by 134.0 centimetres (52.8 in)	35°24′00″N 136°43′47″E	
Aizen Myōō, colour on silk 絹本著色愛染明王像 kenpon chakushoku Aizen Myōō zō		Motosu	private					
Enma-ten, colour on silk 絹本著色閻魔天像 kenpon chakushoku Enma-ten zō		Motosu	private					
Hōrōkaku Mandala, colour on silk 絹本著色宝楼閣曼荼羅図 kenpon chakushoku Hōrōkaku mandara zu		Motosu	private					
Dragon and Clouds, ink on paper, byōbu by Maruyama Ōkyo 紙本墨画雲竜図 応挙筆 六曲屏風 shihon bokuga unryū zu Ōkyo hitsu rokkyoku byōbu	C18	Motosu	private	pair of six-fold screens; perhaps the same as the listing under Kyoto Prefecture of the same subject by the same painter, with the same original designation date (23 April 1908)				

== Prefectural Cultural Properties ==
As of 18 September 2015, one hundred and four properties have been designated at a prefectural level.

Property	Date	Municipality	Ownership	Comments	Image	Dimensions	Coordinates	Ref.
Amida Nyorai 阿弥陀如来像(神戸町); Amida Nyorai (Gōdo)		Gōdo	Jingo-ji (神護寺)			159 centimetres (63 in) by 44 centimetres (17 in)	35°25′16″N 136°36′42″E	

== See also ==
- Cultural Properties of Japan
- List of National Treasures of Japan (paintings)
- Japanese painting
- List of Historic Sites of Japan (Gifu)
- List of Museums in Gifu Prefecture
