= Toki Shigeyori =

Toki Shigeyori (土岐 成頼, 1442 – May 5, 1497) was a leading military commander during the Muromachi period in Mino Province (modern-day Gifu Prefecture), Japan. The characters for his name can also be read as Toki Nariyori. He became the eighth head of the Toki clan at the age of 15 and was the adopted son of Toki Mochimasu. His sons included Toki Masafusa and Toki Motoyori. After becoming a priest later in life, his name was changed to Muneyasu (宗安). His remains are at Zuiryū-ji in the city of Gifu.

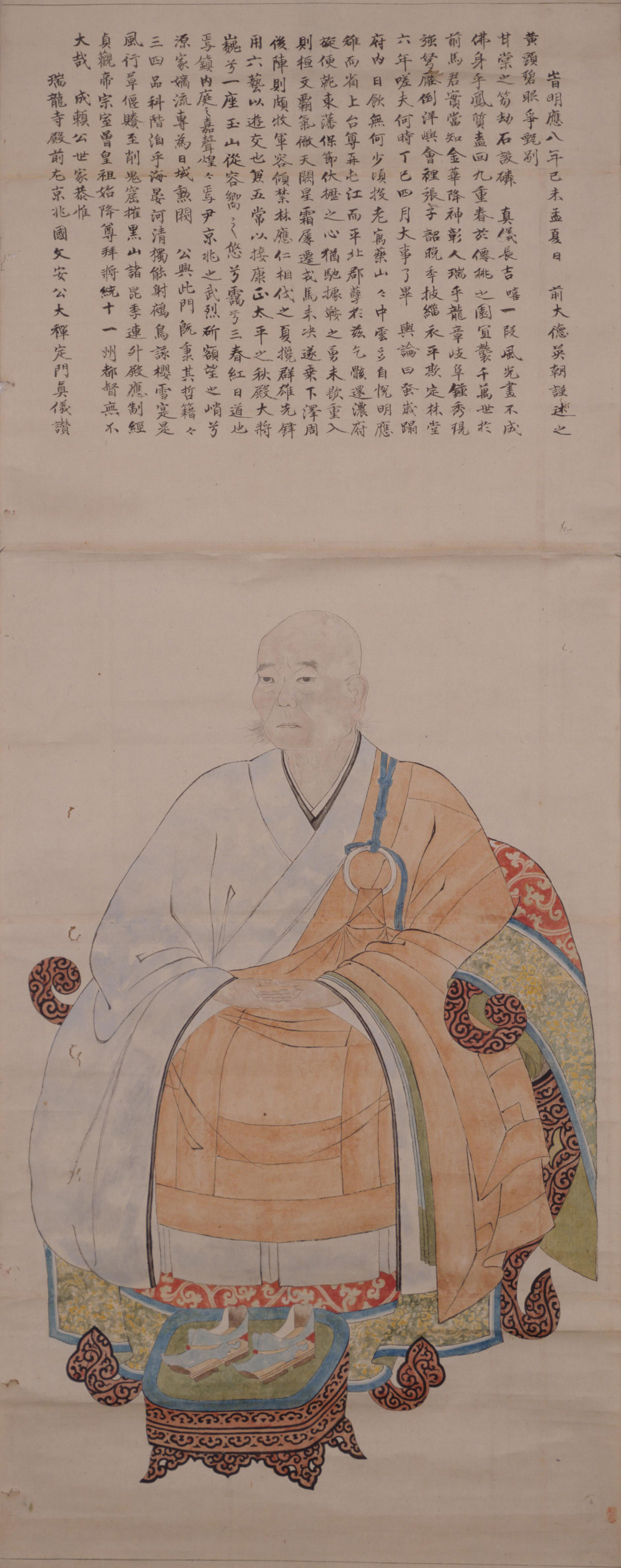
Toki Shigeyori

== Rise to power ==
When Mochimasu's eldest son, Toki Mochikane (土岐持兼) died, Mochikane's son was selected to be the next shugo (governor) of Mino Province. However, Saitō Toshinaga, a shugodai (vice-governor), pushed Shigeyori to be the next shugo. At the time, Shigeyori was a member of the related Isshiki clan, but was adopted by Mochimasu and succeeded him in 1467. This is one of the many examples during the middle part of the Muromachi period in which the shugodai usurped the power of the shugo; the Saitō clan even had its own power usurped later on.

In 1467, Shigeyori fought for the western armies in the Ōnin War. He commanded a group of 8,000 men and fought with the forces stationed in Kyoto; his actions protected the life of Saitō Myōchin, the current shugodai of Mino Province. Afterwards, the Tomishima (富島氏 Tomishima-shi) and Nagae (長江氏 Nagae-shi) clans sided with the eastern armies and a civil war broke out within Mino Province, but Myōchin was able to defeat them. Because there were fears that the eastern armies would be able to take control of an influence the bakufu, the western armies worked to gain organize and join with powerful shrines and other strong groups. Through this, Myōchin was able to extend his power to Owari, Ise, Ōmi and Hida provinces and Shigeyori was able to exert more influence over the western armies.

== Return to Mino Province ==
In 1477, after the end of the Ōnin War, Shigeyori gave sanctuary to Ashikaga Yoshimi and his son Ashikaga Yoshitane, the nominal heads of the western armies, he returned home to Mino Province. Yoshimi and Yoshitane spent the following eleven years living in Kawate Castle.

After Myōchin died in 1480, Saitō Myōjun and Saitō Toshifuji fought for the right to succeed Myōchin. Myōjun won and further strengthened the power of the Saitō clan.
