= Jōzai-ji =

Jōzai-ji (常在寺) is the name of three Buddhist temples of the Nichiren sect in Japan. It could refer to one of the following:

- Jōzai-ji (Toshima) in Toshima, Tokyo
- Jōzai-ji (Ebina) in Ebina, Kanagawa Prefecture
- Jōzai-ji (Gifu) in Gifu, Gifu Prefecture (the Saitō clan's temple)
