= Mizunami Fossil Museum =

- 瑞浪市化石博物館
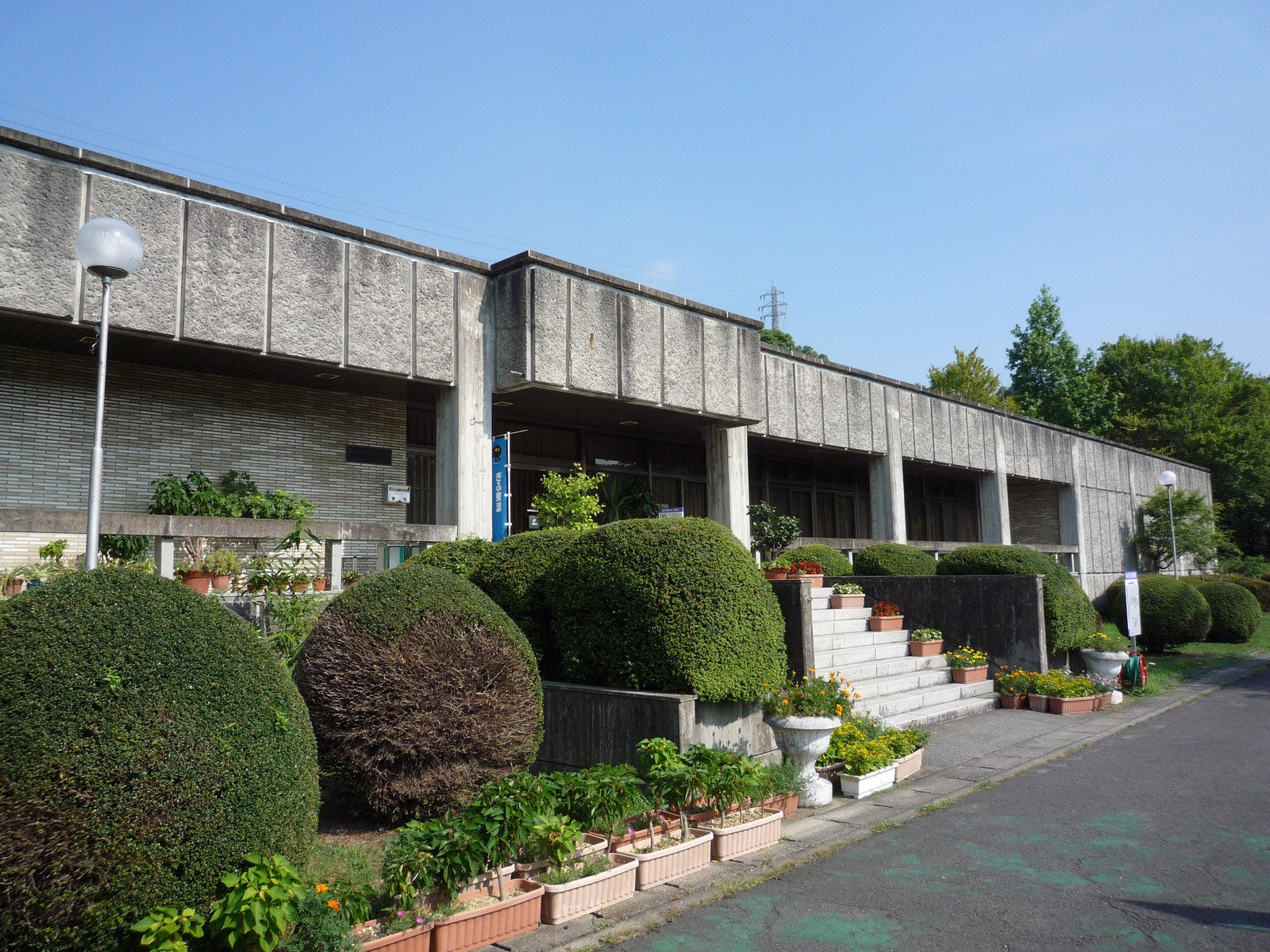
- Mizunami Fossil Museum

- Location within Japan

General information
- Location: 1-47 Yamanouchi, Akeyo-chō, Mizunami, Gifu Prefecture, Japan
- Coordinates: 35°22′23″N 137°14′07″E
- Opened: 1974

Website
- Official website

Mizunami Fossil Museum (瑞浪市化石博物館, Mizunami-shi Kaseki Hakubutsukan) is a museum of fossils in Mizunami, Gifu Prefecture, Japan. The museum, which opened in 1974, has a special focus on the palaeoenvironment of the area and on the fossils of the Miocene Mizunami Group. The collection includes some 250,000 fossils, of which around 3,000 are included in the permanent display.

== Publications ==
- Bulletin of the Mizunami Fossil Museum (瑞浪市化石博物館研究報告) (1974–)

== See also ==
- Gifu Prefectural Museum
- Fukui Prefectural Dinosaur Museum
