= Gifu Prefectural Museum =

- 岐阜県博物館
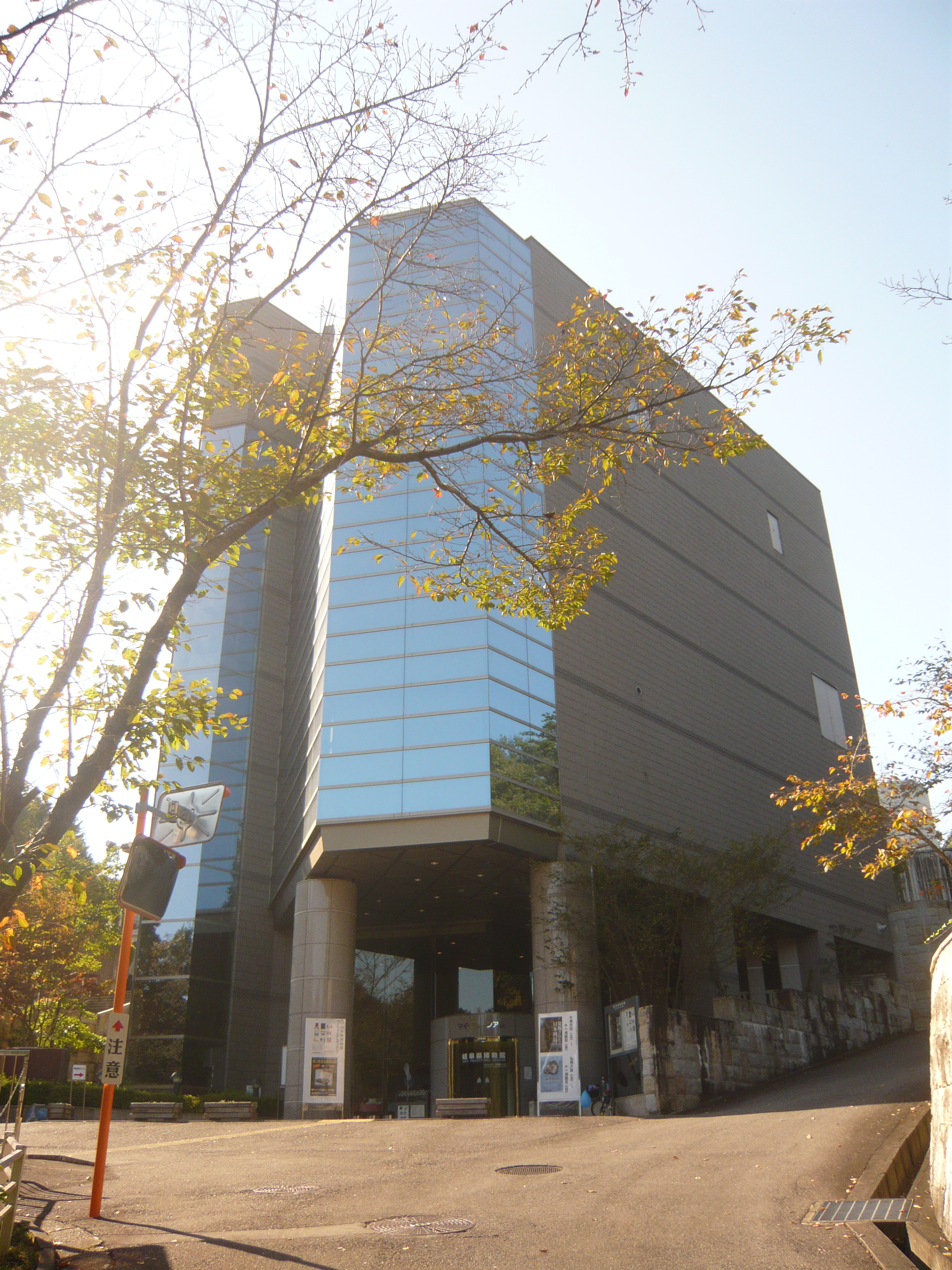
- Interactive map of the Gifu Prefectural Museum area

General information
- Location: 1989 Oyana, Seki, Gifu Prefecture, Japan
- Coordinates: 35°28′41″N 136°52′09″E
- Opened: May 1976

Website
- Official website

Gifu Prefectural Museum (岐阜県博物館, Gifu-ken Hakubutsukan) opened in Seki, Gifu Prefecture, Japan, in 1976. The collection and its display relate the natural and cultural history of the area.

== See also ==
- List of Cultural Properties of Japan - paintings (Gifu)
- List of Historic Sites of Japan (Gifu)
- Museum of Fine Arts, Gifu
