= Zuiryū-ji (Gifu) =

Buddhist temple in Gifu, Japan

Coordinates: 35°25′10.98″N 136°46′1.26″E

Zuiryū-ji 瑞龍寺
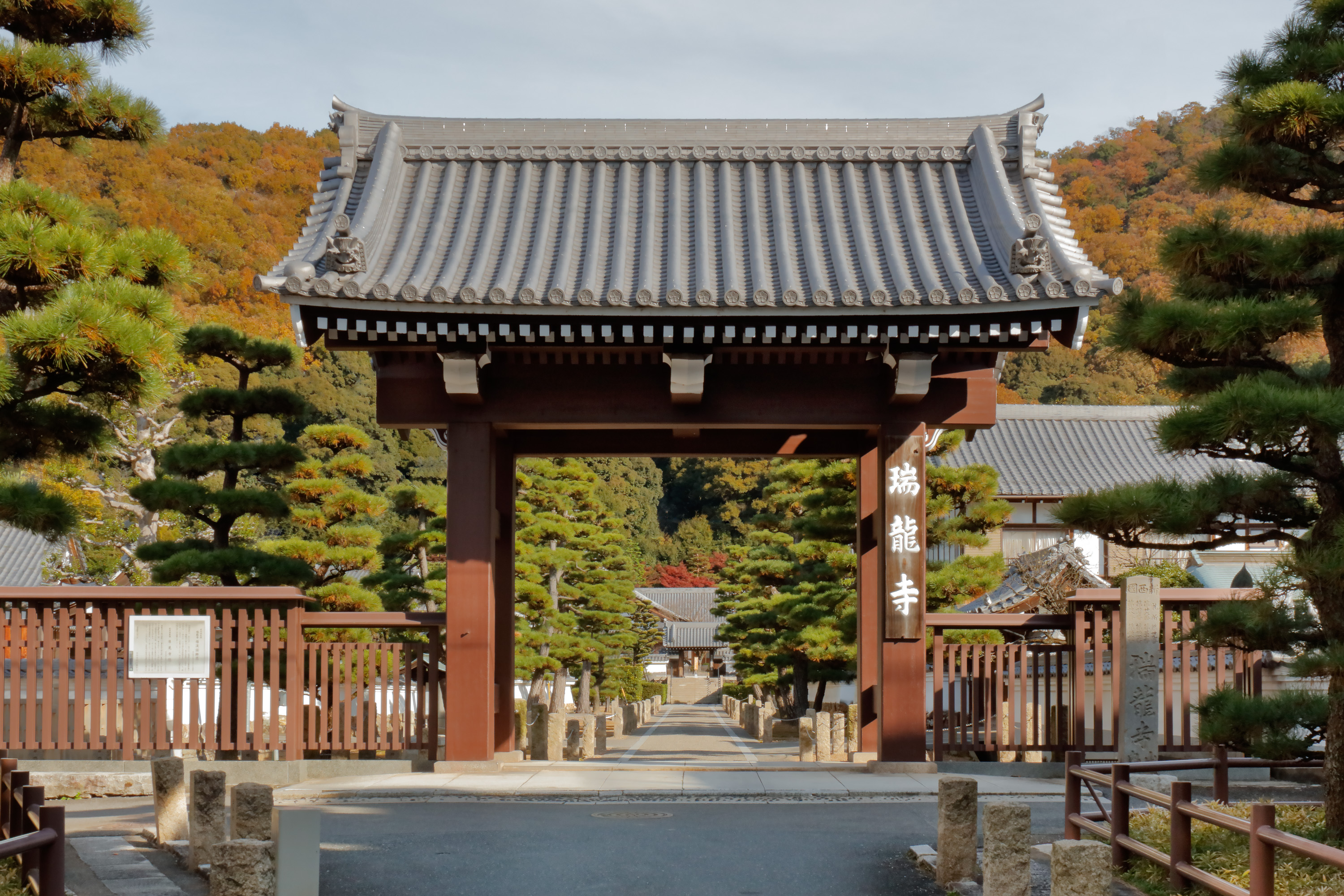
- Entrance to Zuiryo-ji

Religion
- Affiliation: Rinzai sect

Location
- Location: 19 Tera-machi, Gifu, Gifu Prefecture
- Country: Japan
- Interactive map of Zuiryū-ji 瑞龍寺

Architecture
- Completed: 1468

Website
- Zuiryo-ji

Zuiryū-ji (瑞龍寺) is a Buddhist temple of the Rinzai sect built in Mino Province (modern-day Gifu, Gifu Prefecture, Japan). It is a branch temple of Myōshin-ji in Kyoto, Kyoto Prefecture, Japan.

== History ==
Construction of the temple was completed in 1468.

== Temple buildings ==
After entering the main gate there are six temples: three are located on the left of the main path (Tentaku-in, Kaizen-in, Unryu-in) and three are on the right (Zuiun-in, Kakusei-in, Gaun-in). The graves of Saitō Myōchin and Toki Shigeyori are also located on the compound.

== Gallery ==
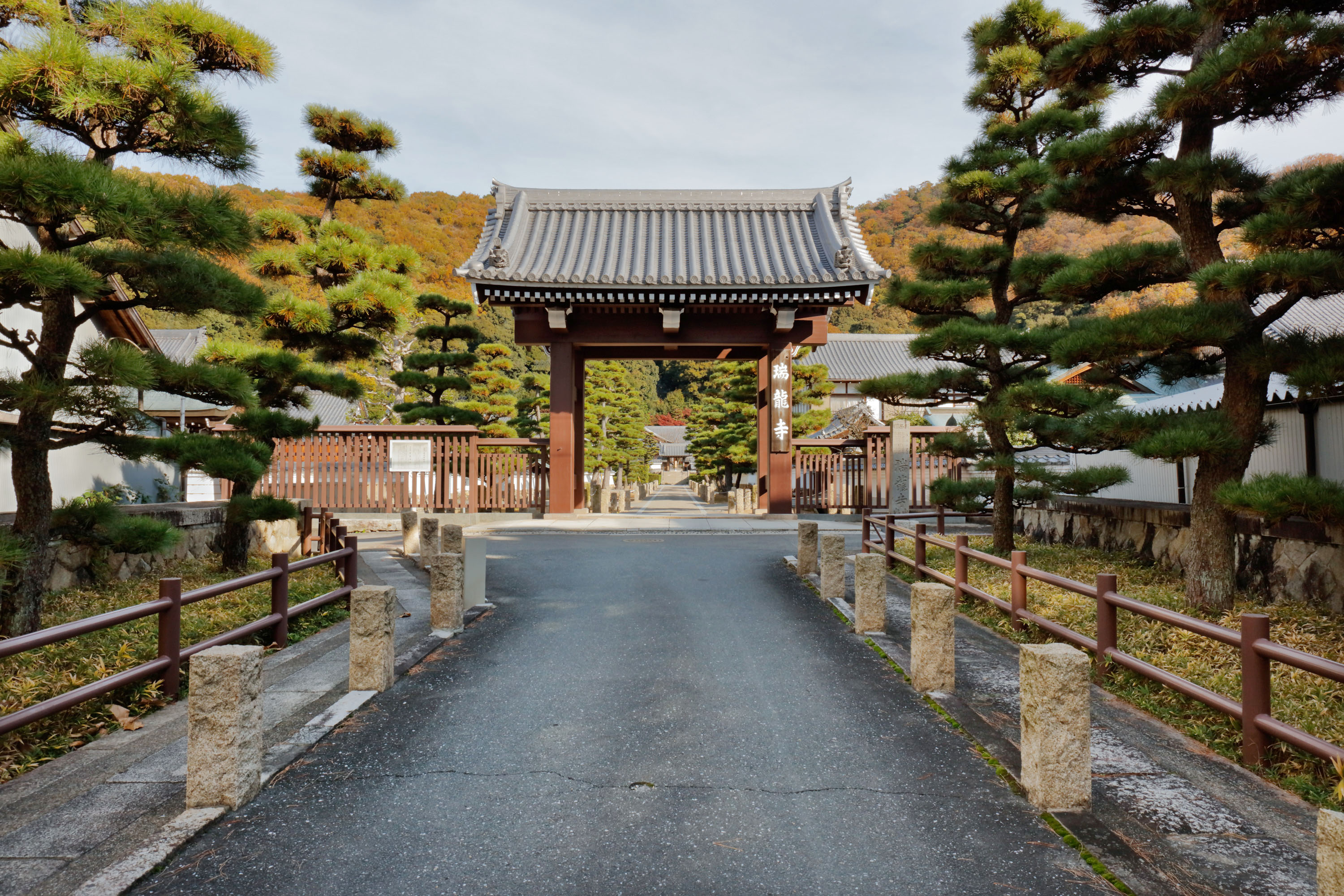

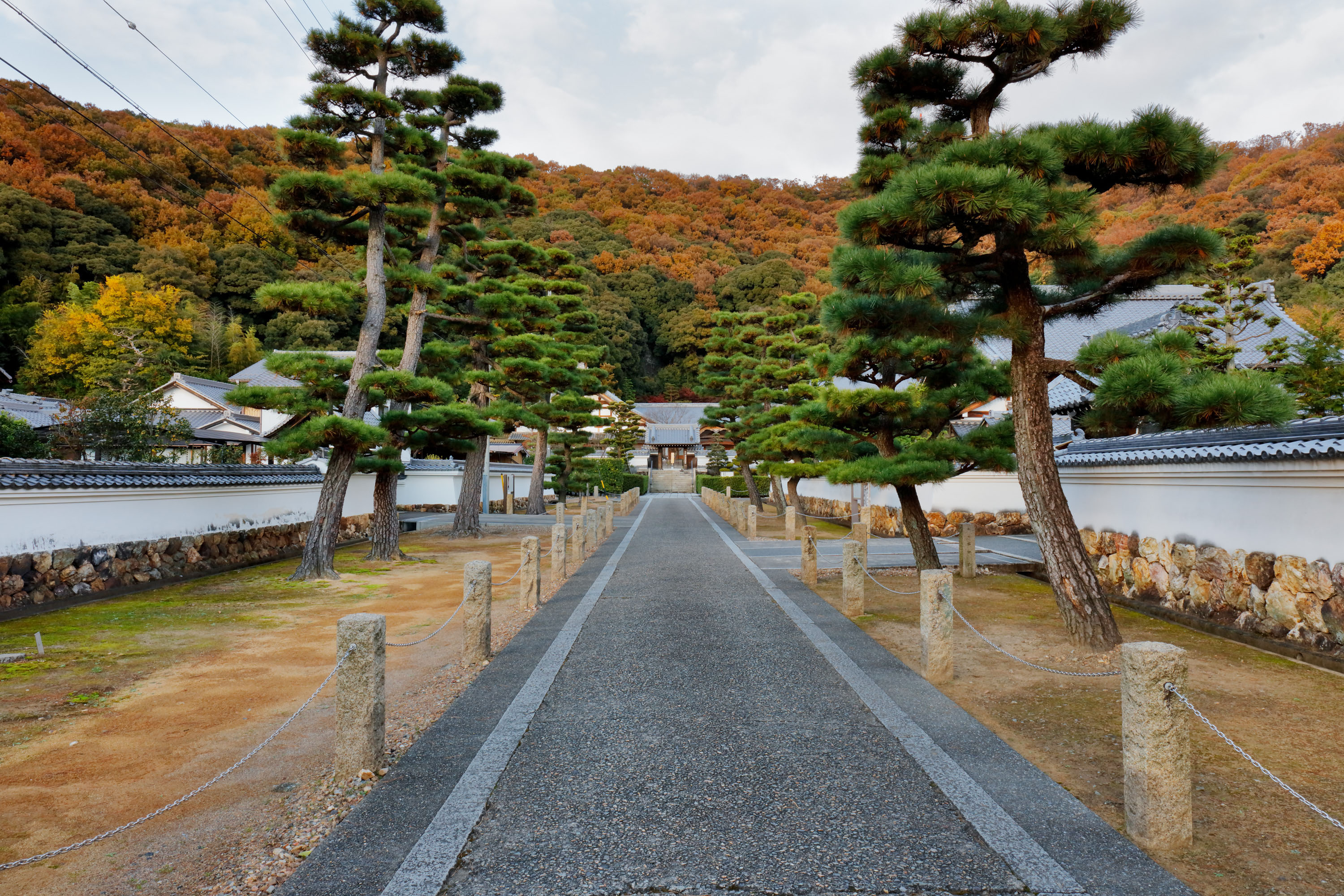

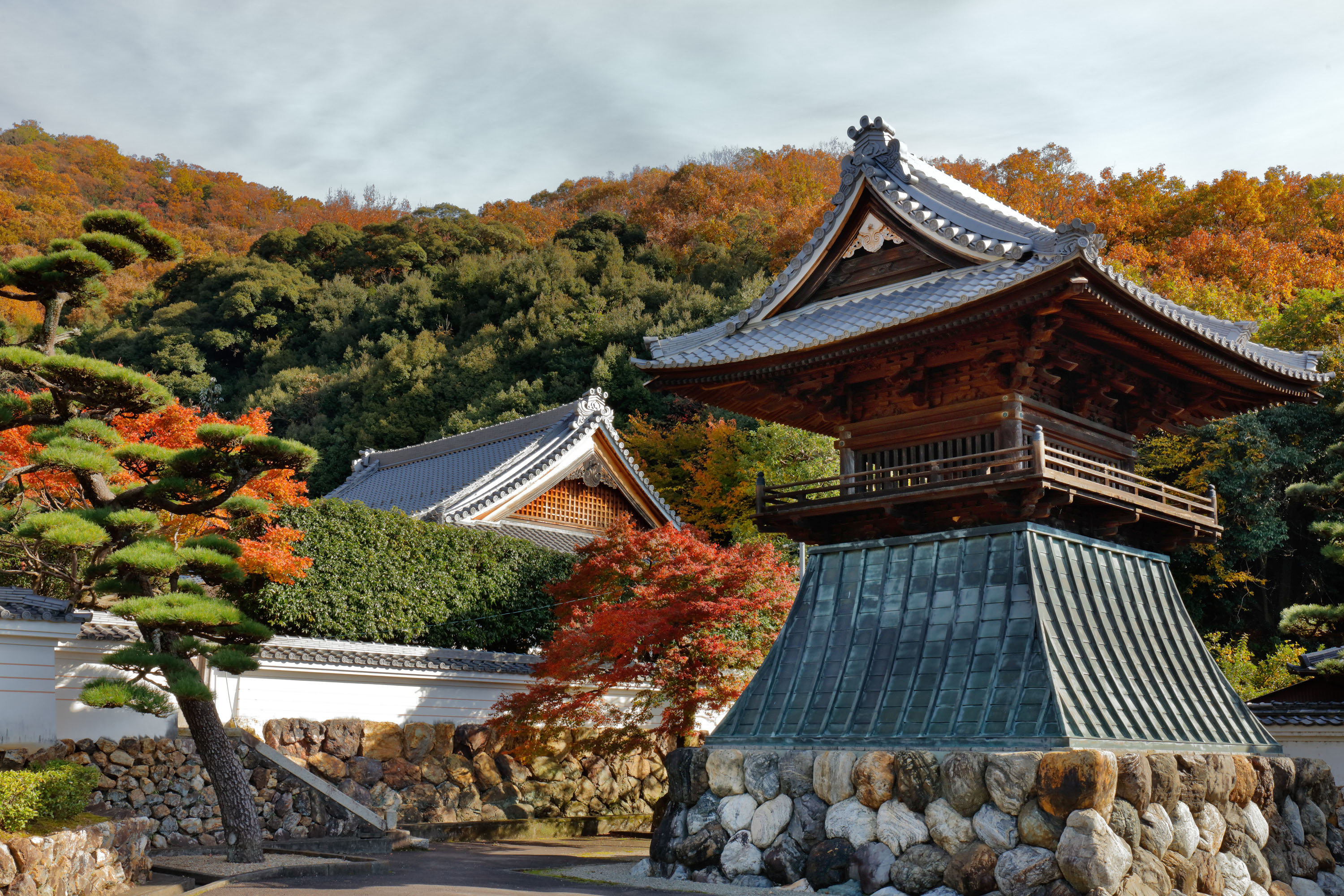

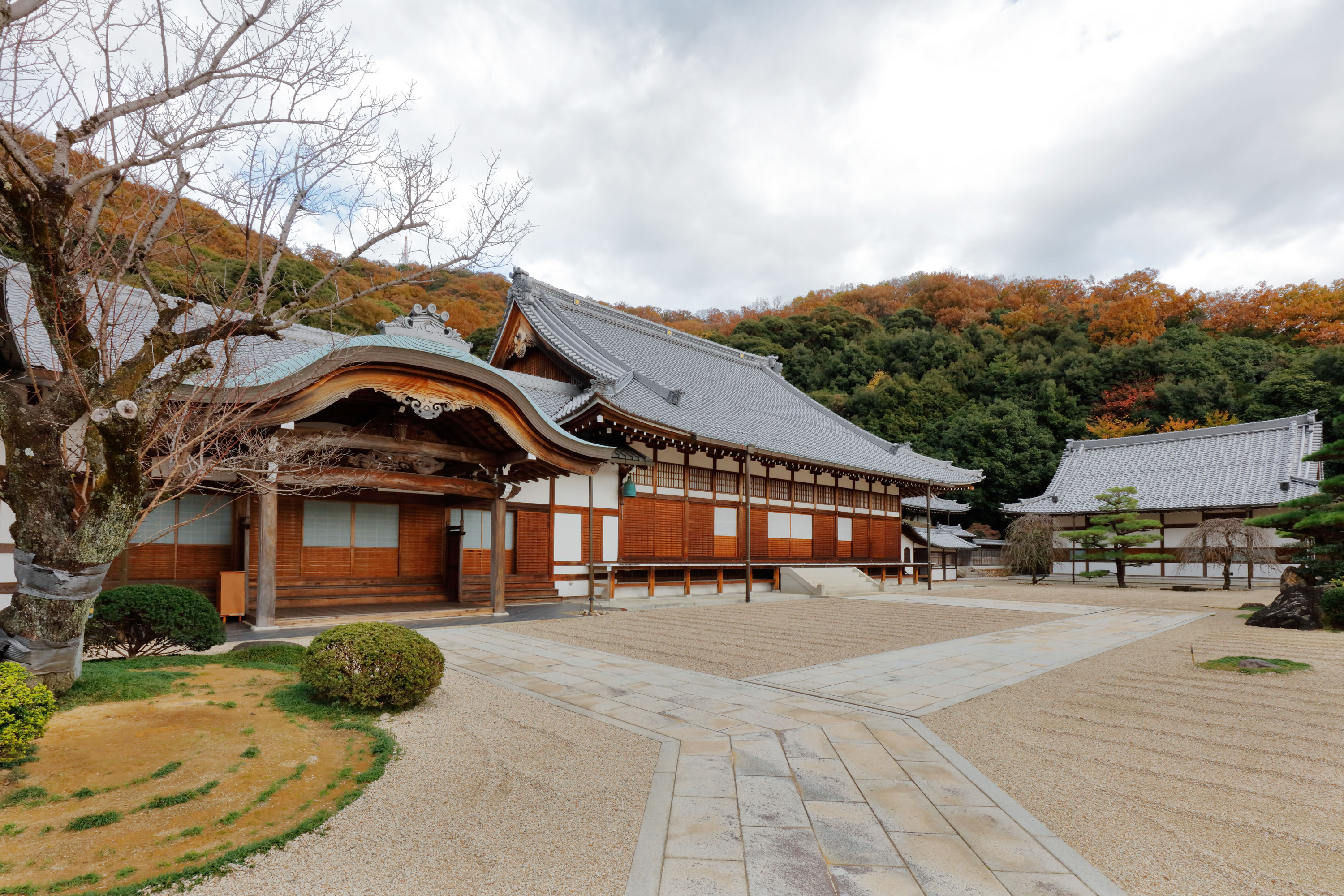

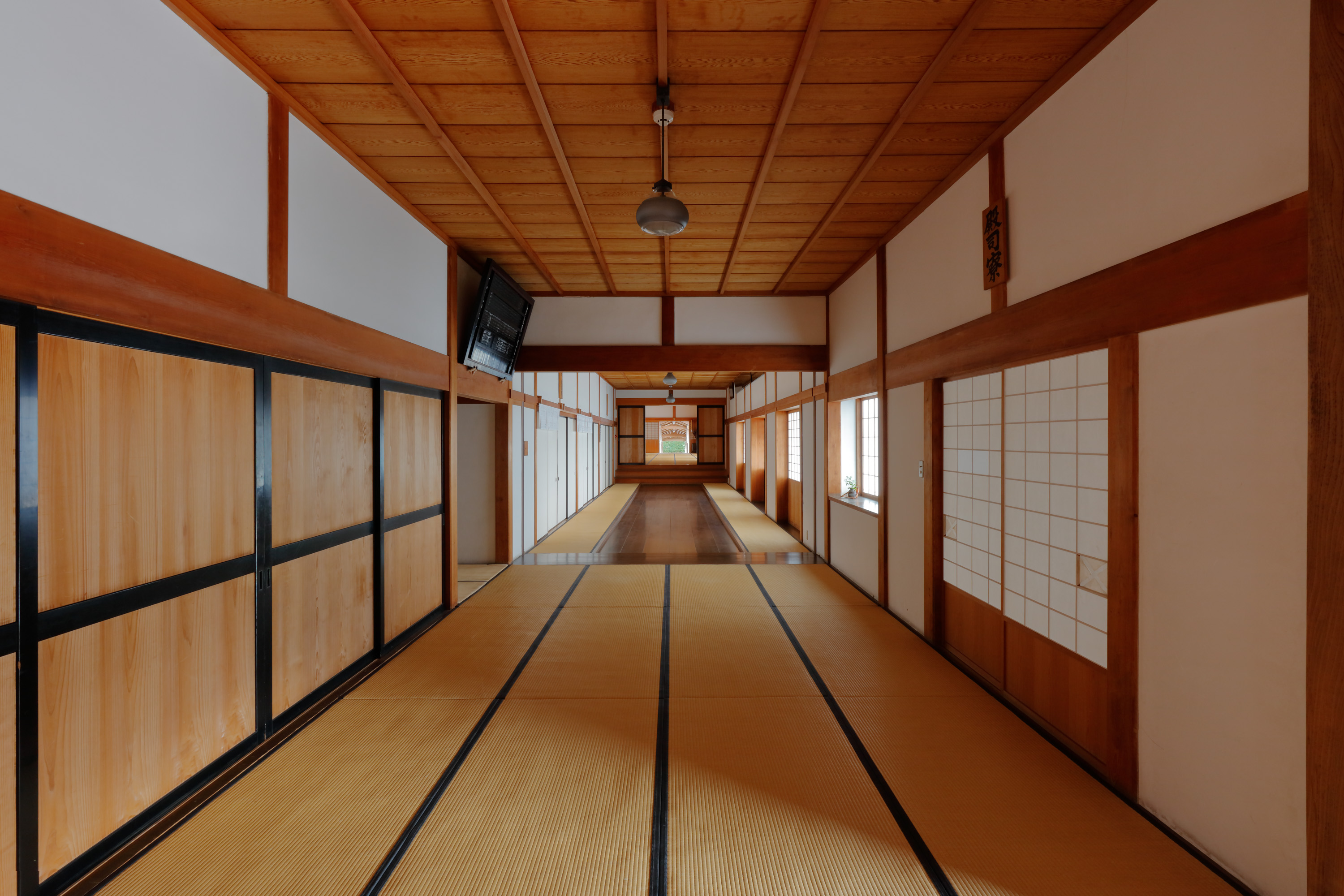

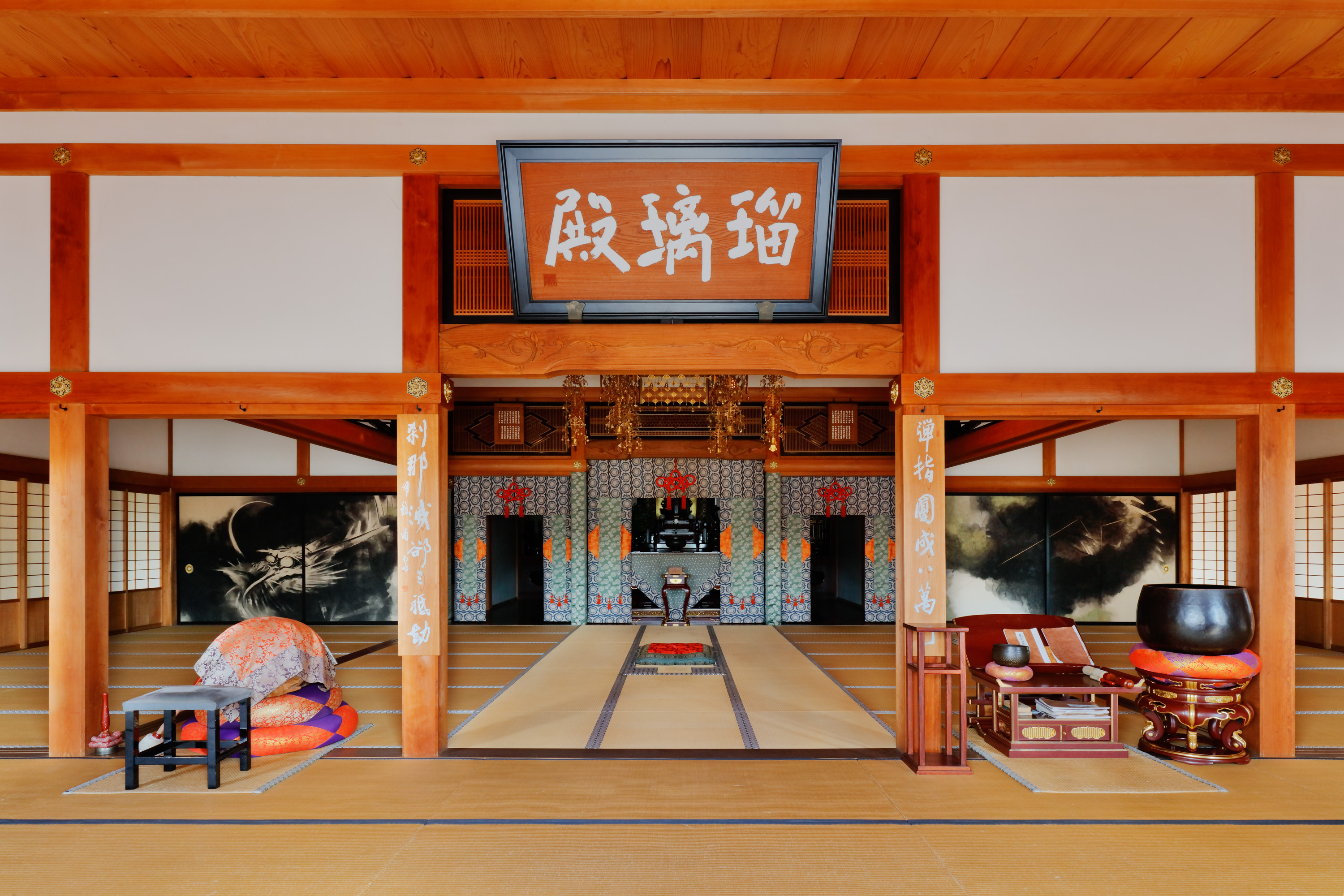

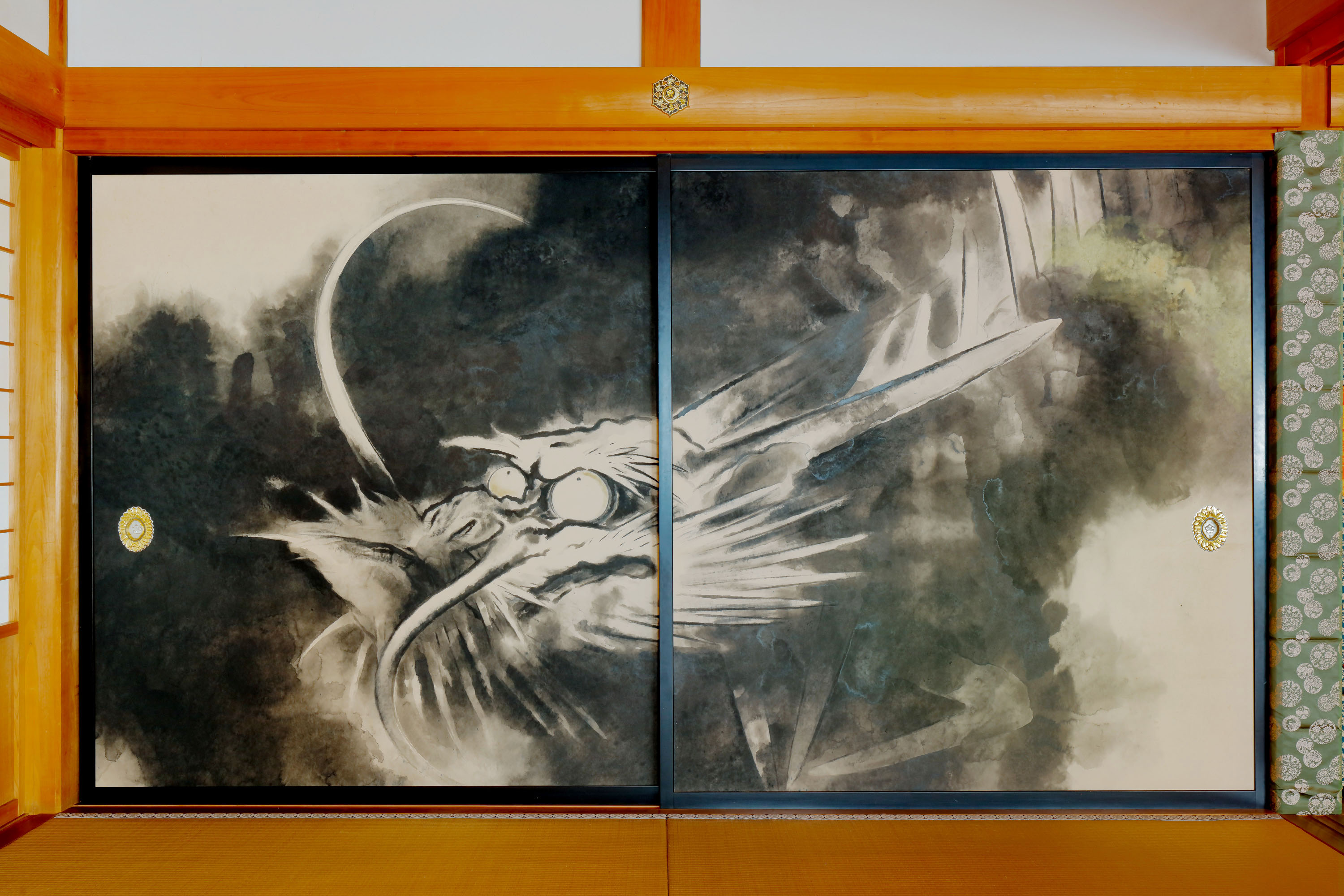

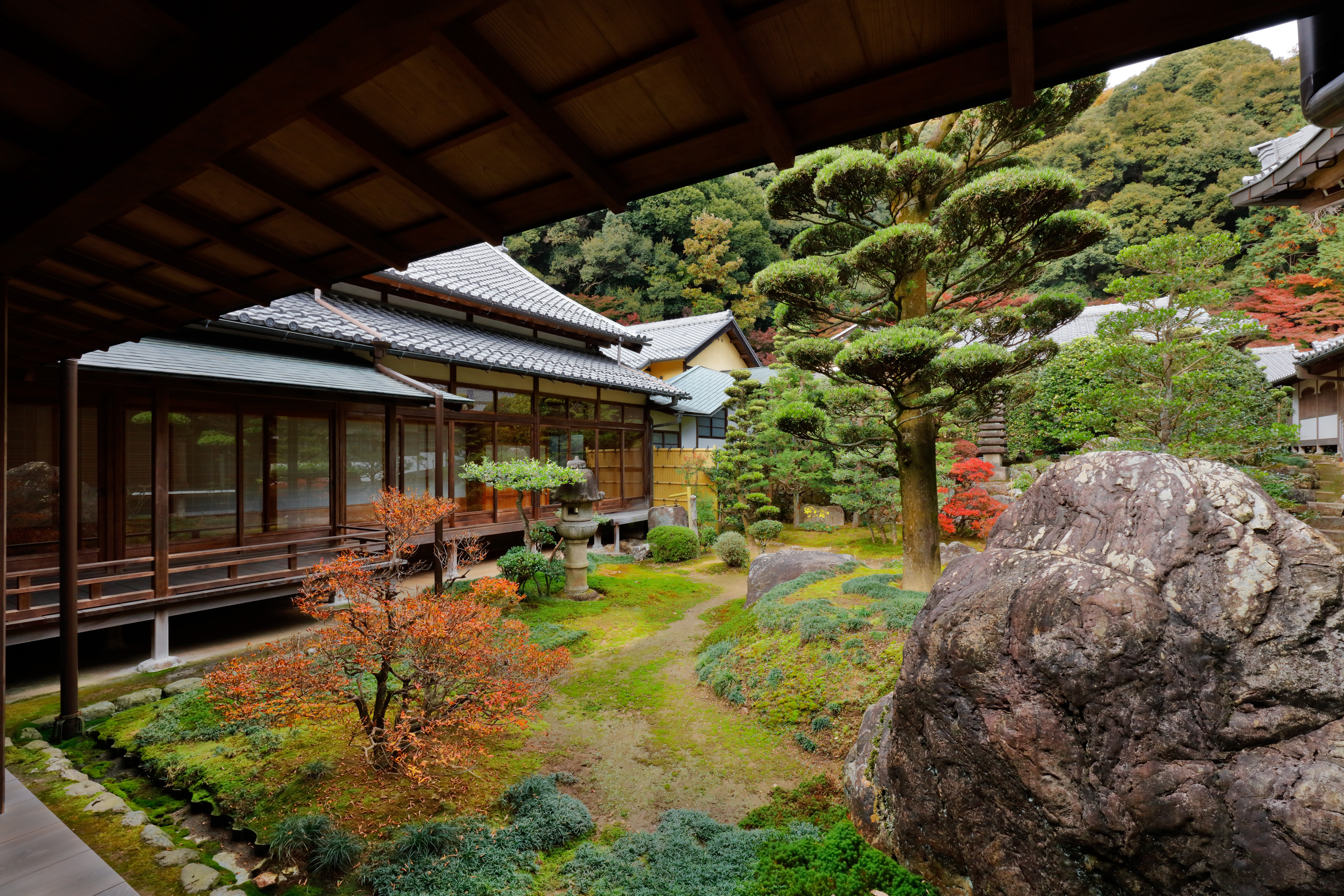

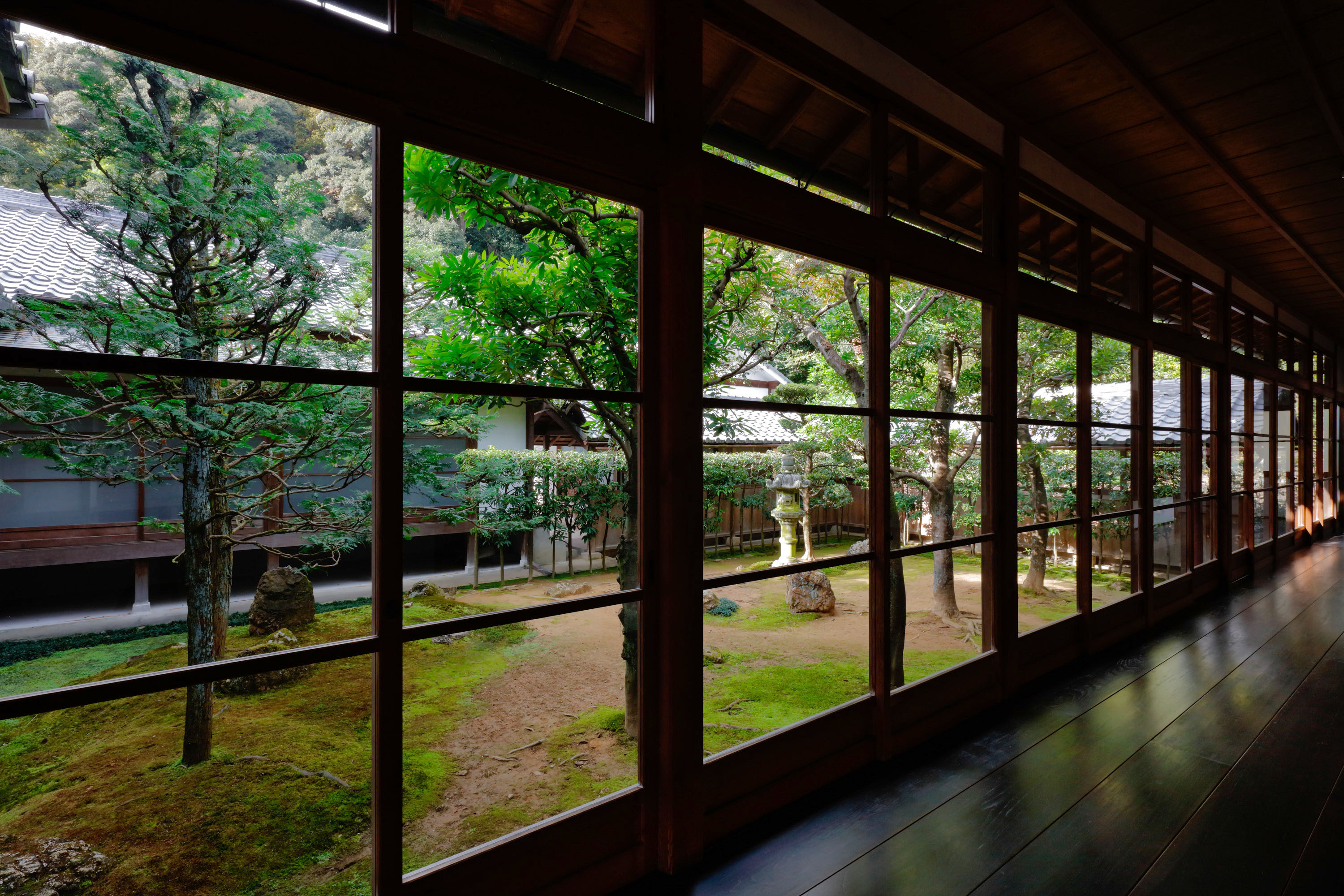

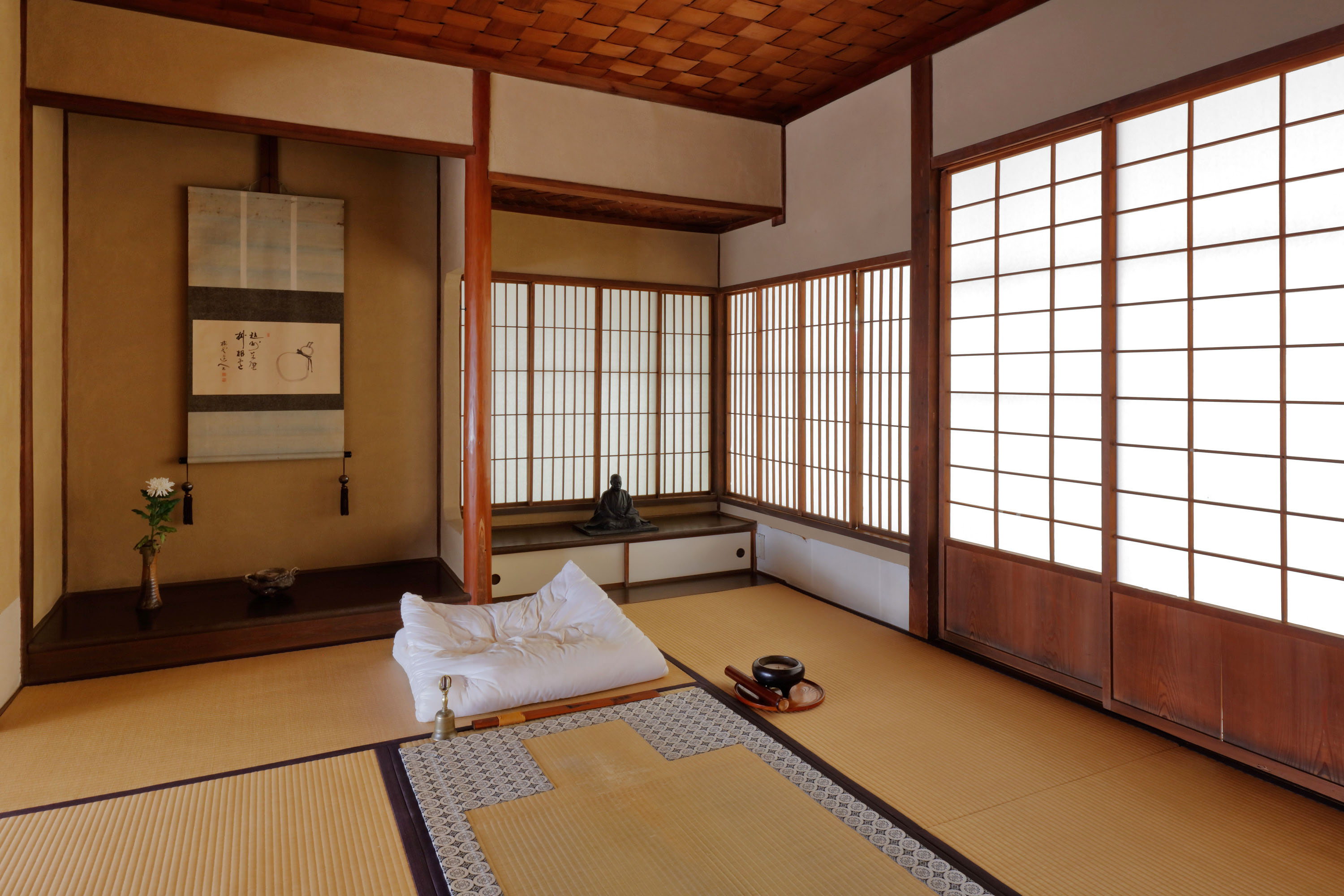

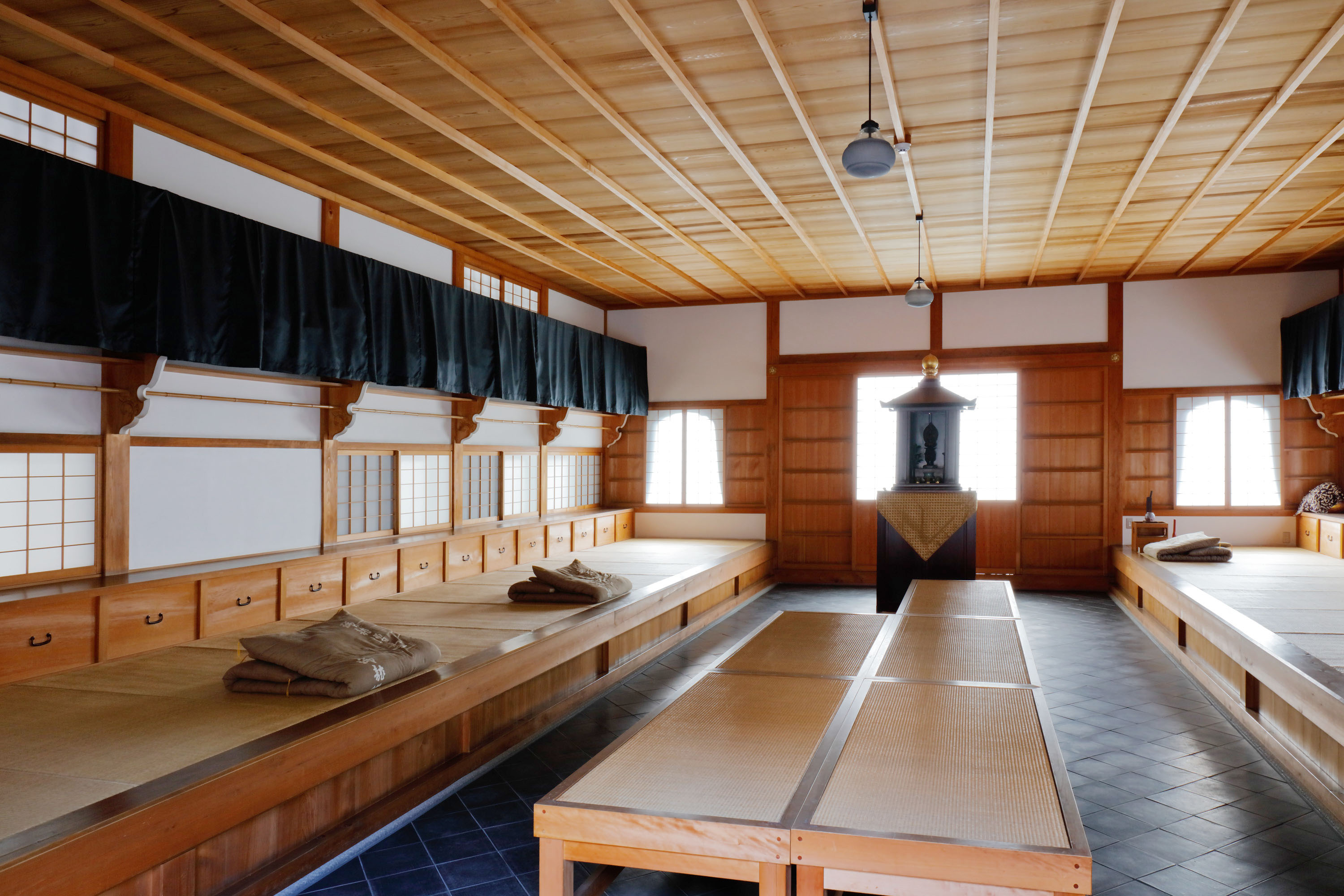

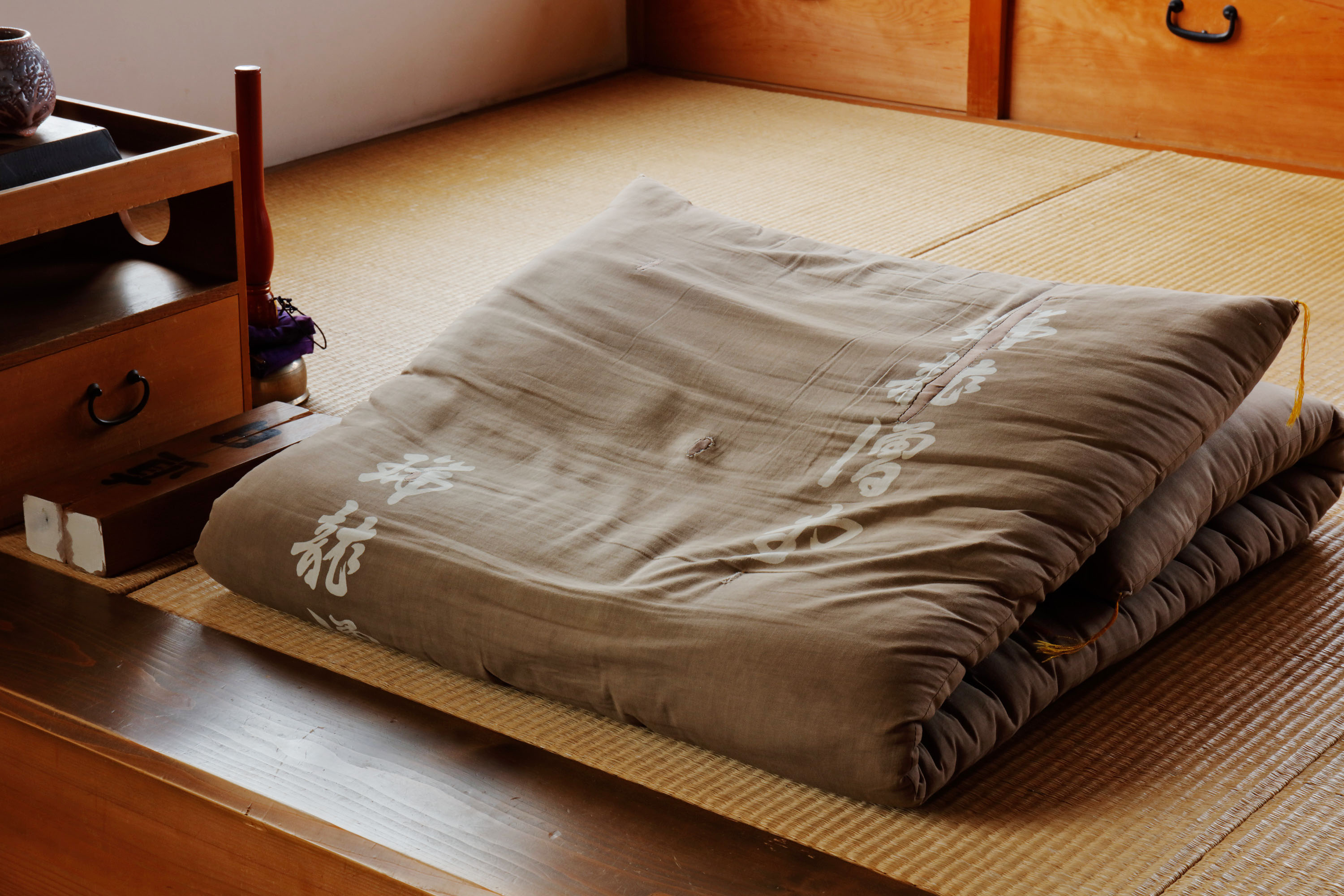

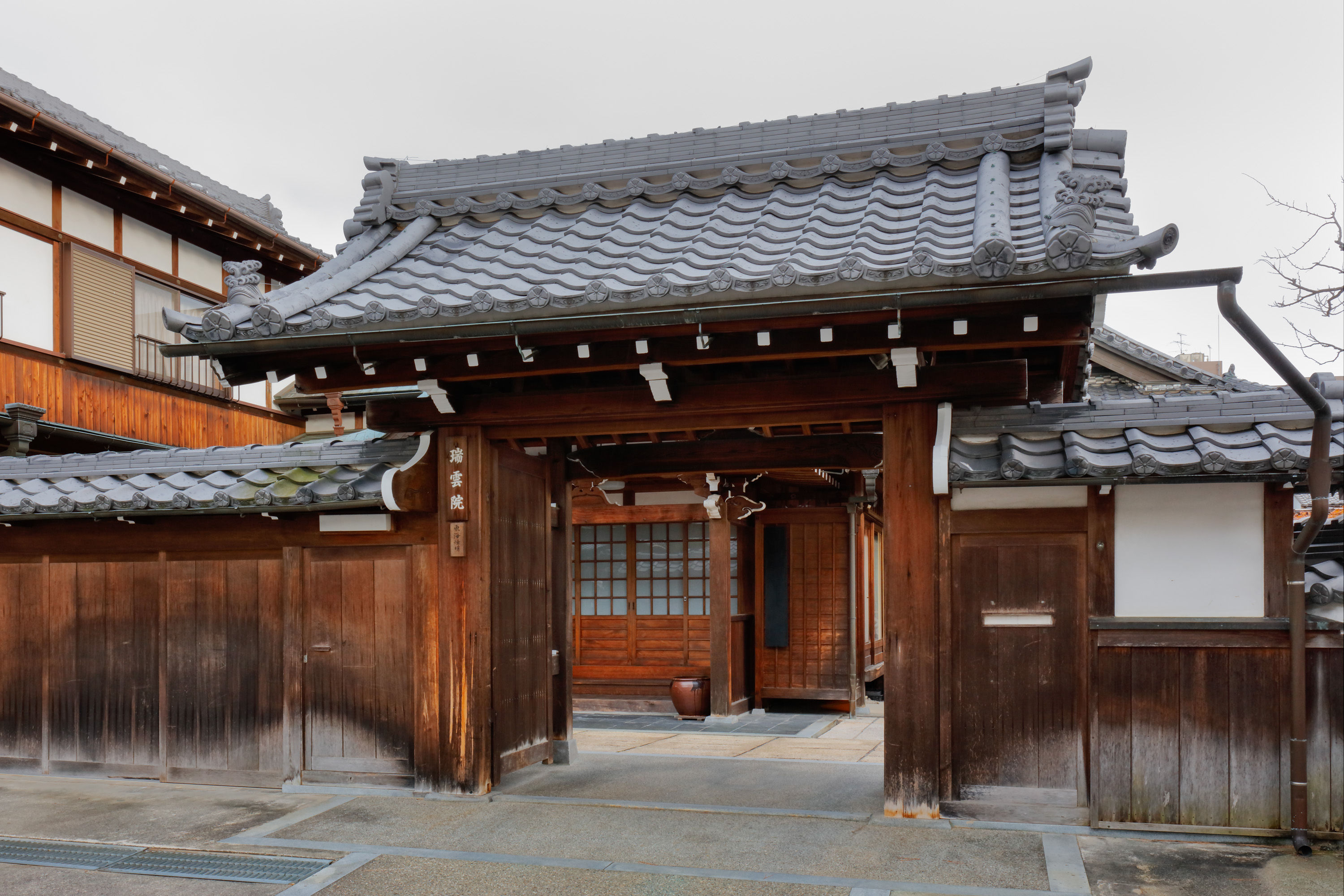
Zuiun-in

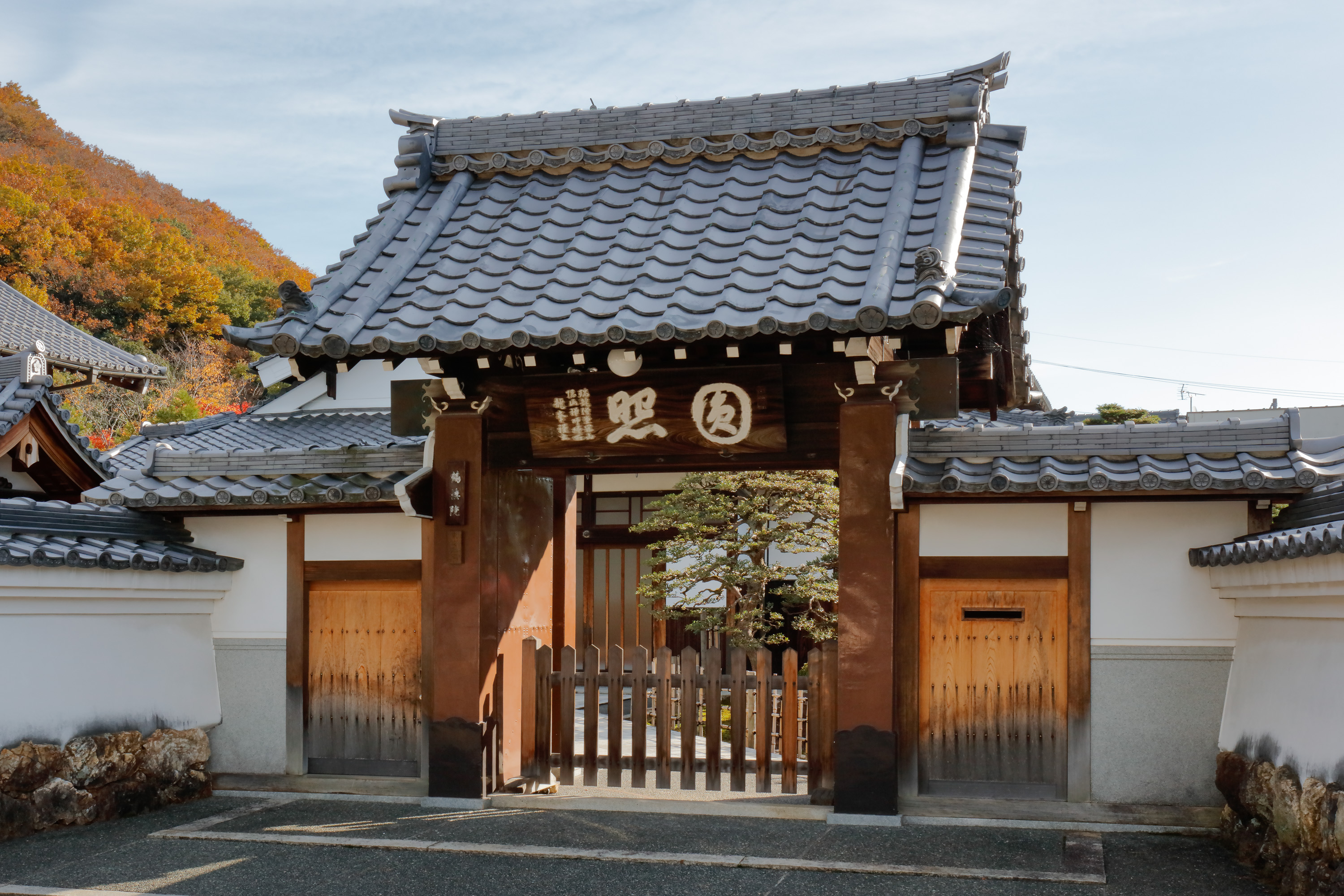
Kakusei-in

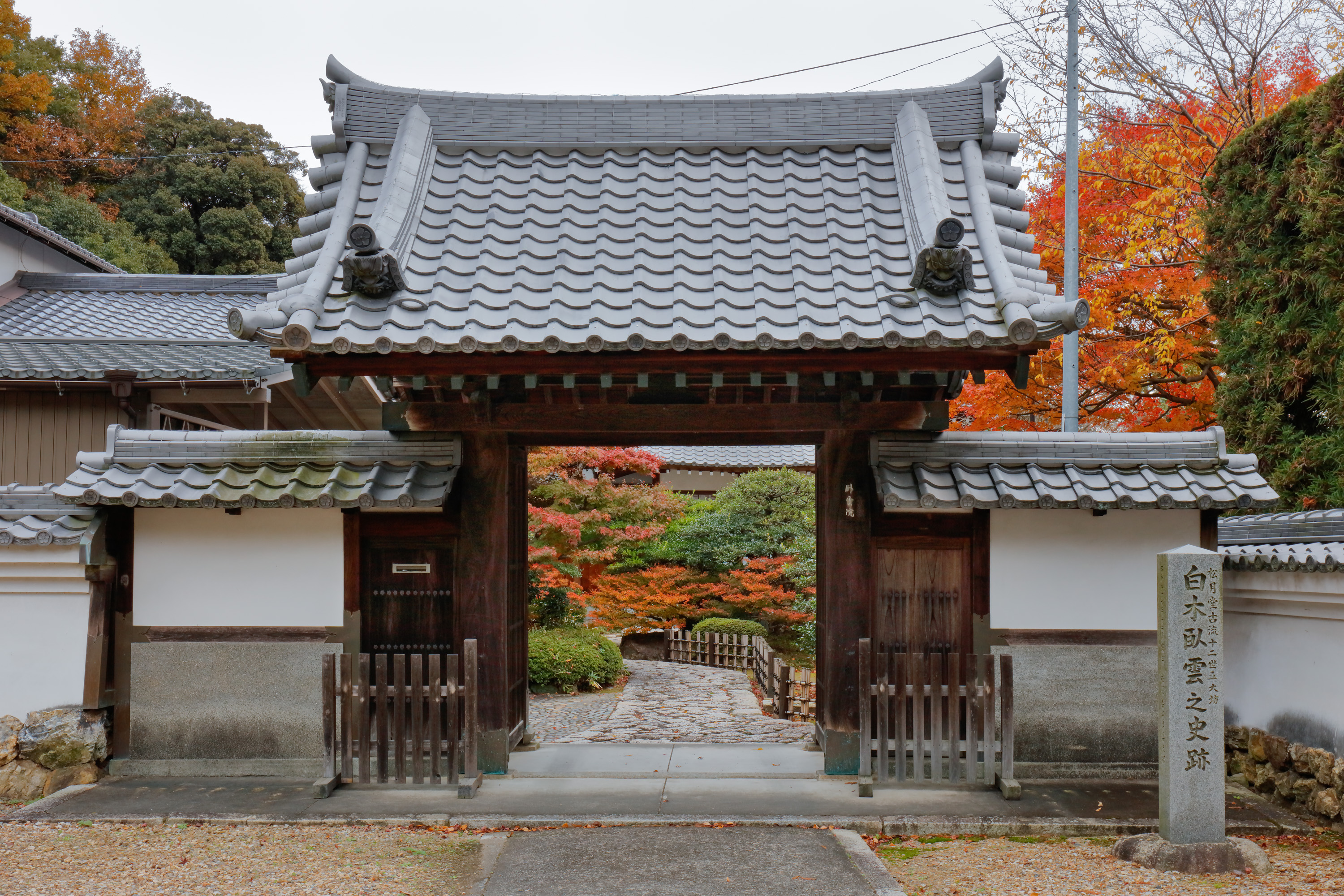
Gaun-in

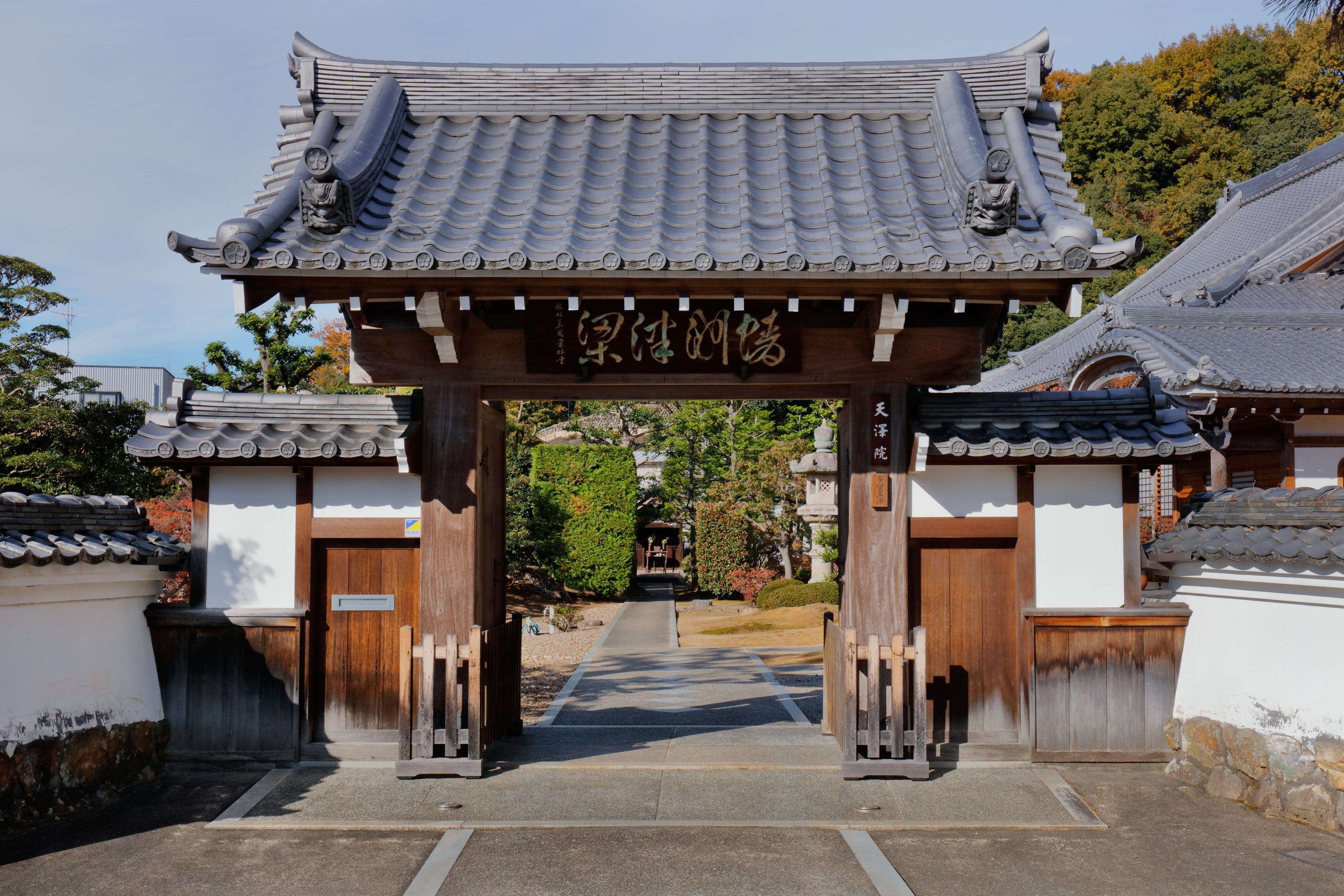
Tentaku-in

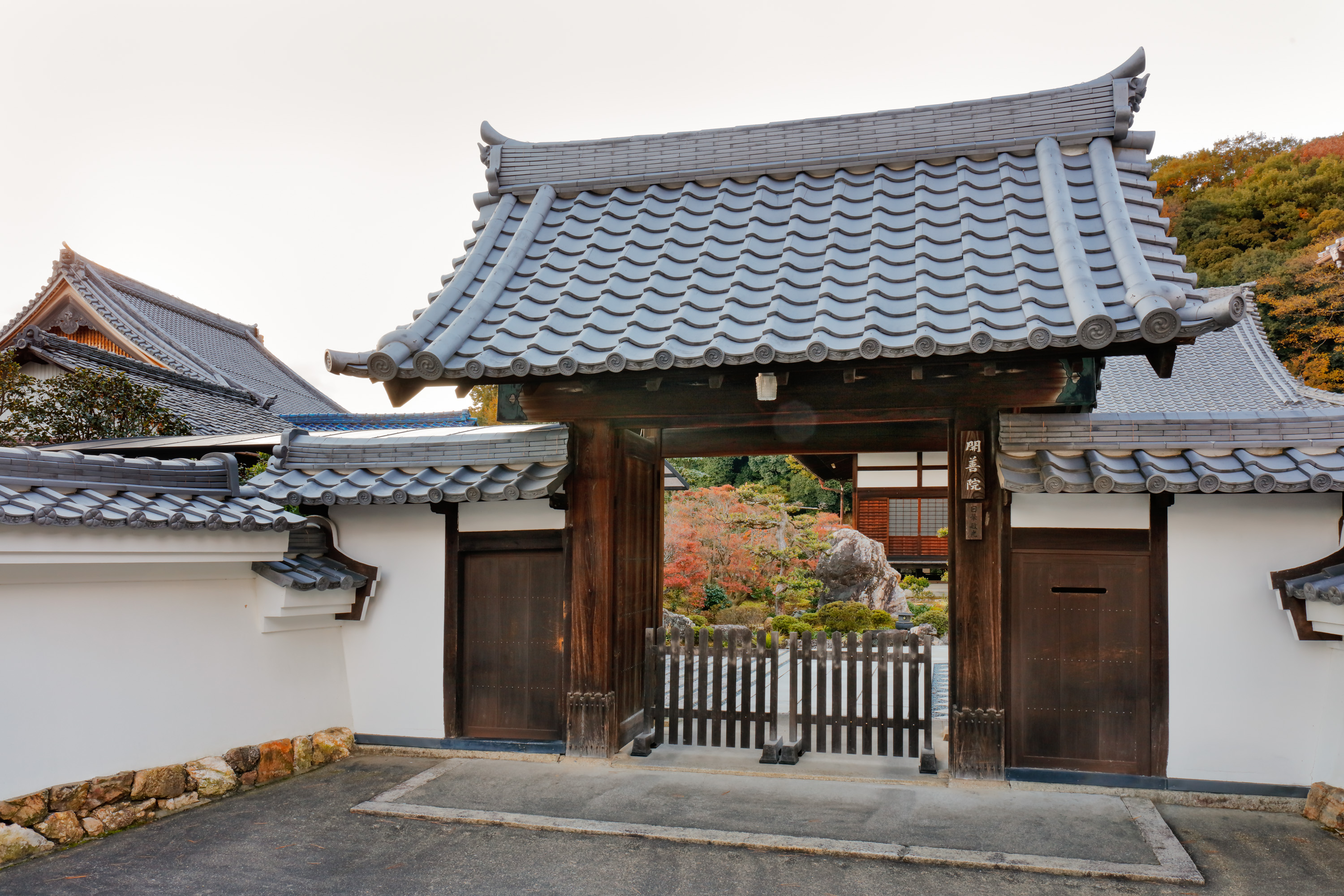
Kaizen-in

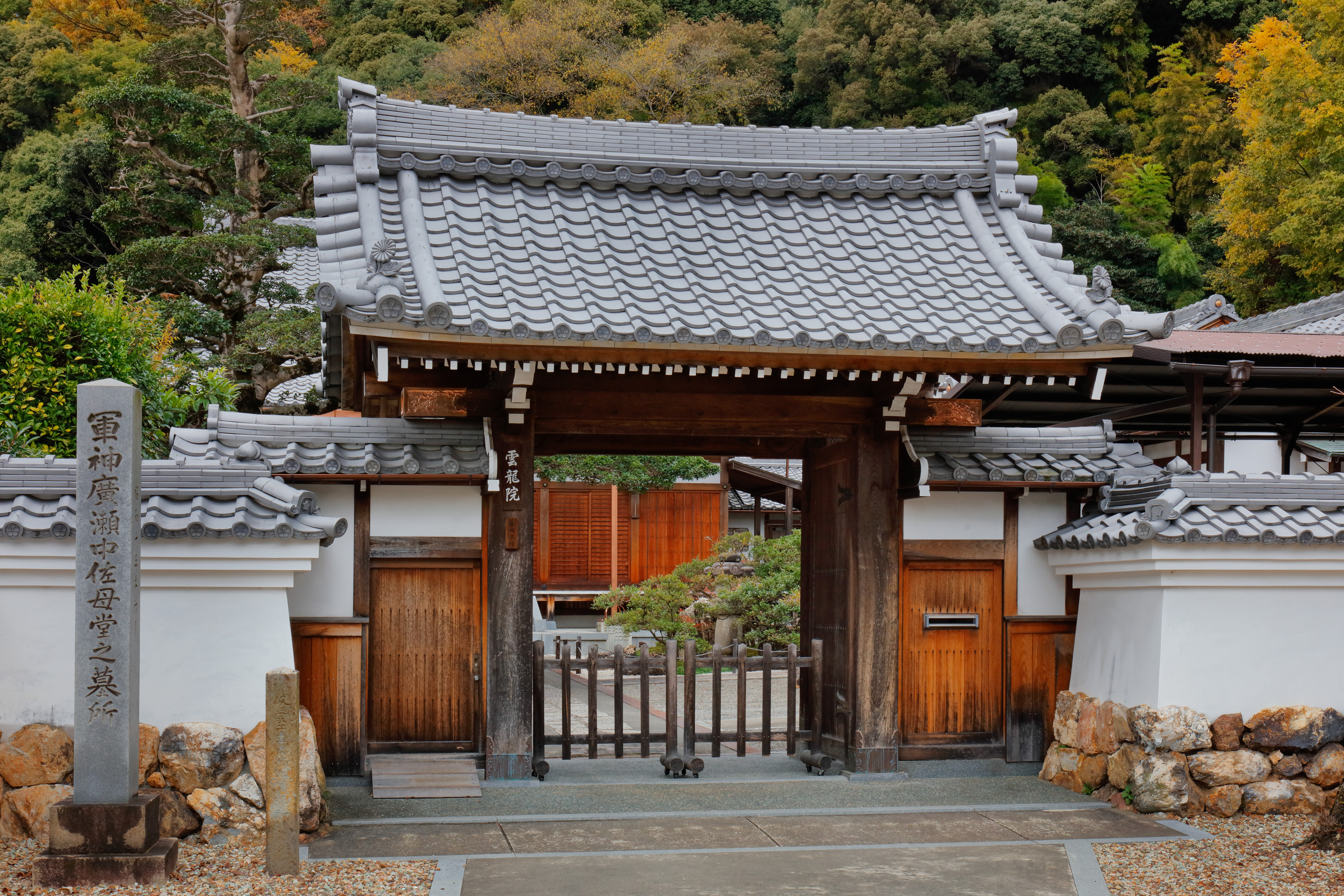
Unryu-in
