= Saitō Myōchin =

Saitō Myōchin (斎藤 妙椿, 1411 – April 1, 1480) was a Japanese daimyo and a monk during the Sengoku period.

== Biography ==
Myōchin was the son of Saitō Sōen (斎藤宗円), who served as the guardian of Mino Province, and the younger brother of Saitō Toshinaga. He began his training as a monk from a young age at Zene-ji (善恵寺).

In 1450, Saitō Myōchin served as the guardian of upper Mino Province on behalf of the Toki clan. During his reign, he built Jōzai-ji in modern-day Gifu. The temple would later become the family temple for the Saitō clan. When Yoshinaga died in 1460, Myōchin moved from Jōzai-ji and into nearby Kanō Castle.

His grave is on the grounds of Zuiryū-ji in Gifu, Gifu Prefecture.
