= Takatomi Domain =

Takatomi Domain 高富藩
- Domain of Japan
- 1605–1871
- Capital: Takatomi jin'ya
  - Type: Daimyō
- Historical era: Edo period
  - Established: 1605
  - Disestablished: 1871
- Today part of: Gifu Prefecture

Takatomi Domain (高富藩, Takatomi han) was a fudai feudal domain of Edo period Japan. It was located in Mino Province, in central Honshū. The domain was centered at Takatomi jin'ya, located in what is now the city of Yamagata in Gifu Prefecture.

== History ==
Takatomi Domain was created by Shōgun Tokugawa Tsunayoshi for Honjō Michiaki, the grandson of Honjō Michimasa, who was step-brother to his birth-mother Keishōin in 1705. It was originally called Iwataki Domain (岩滝藩).

The domain had an assigned kokudaka of 10,000 koku. The jin’ya was transferred to Takatomi in 1709. Honjō Michimasa did not reside in the domain, but remained mostly in Edo Castle. Although his domain was very small, Honjō Michimasa and his successors were assigned many tasks pertaining to placating the kuge nobility in Kyoto, and the domain's revenues were not commensurate with this task. As a result, by the time of the 8th daimyō the domain was very deeply in debt. The 9th daimyō, Honjō Michitsura, attempted fiscal reforms, including fiscal frugality, planting of forests for harvestable wood, issuance of paper money and increases taxes on his peasantry. He also hired a rice merchant from Kyoto as financial advisor; however none of these measures worked, and in 1868 the domain defaulted on all of its debts, and its peasants rose in revolt. At the time, the domain was 207,400 ryō in debt.

In 1869, the final daimyō, Honjō Michiyoshi, was appointed domain governor under the new Meiji government until the abolition of the han system in 1871. In 1872, the domain became part of Gifu Prefecture.

== Bakumatsu period holdings ==
As with most domains in the han system, Takatomi Domain consisted of a discontinuous territories calculated to provide the assigned kokudaka, based on periodic cadastral surveys and projected agricultural yields.

- Mino Province
  - 2 villages in Kakami District
  - 7 villages in Katagata District
  - 4 villages in Yamagata District
- Shimotsuke Province
  - 6 villages in Yanada District

== List of daimyōs ==
- Honjō clan (fudai) 1664–1871

	Name	Tenure	Courtesy title	Court Rank	kokudaka
1	Honjō Michiakira (本庄道章)	1705–1725	Kunai-shoyu (宮内少輔)	Junior 5th Rank, Lower Grade (従五位下)	10,000 koku
2	Honjō Michinori (本庄道矩)	1725–1745	Yamato-no-kami (大和守)	Junior 5th Rank, Lower Grade (従五位下)	10,000 koku
3	Honjō Michitomo (本庄道倫)	1745–1756	Izumi-no-kami (和泉守)	Junior 5th Rank, Lower Grade (従五位下)	10,000 koku
4	Honjō Michikata (本庄道堅)	1756–1760	Yamato-no-kami (大和守)	Junior 5th Rank, Lower Grade (従五位下)	10,000 koku
5	Honjō Michinobu (本庄道信)	1760–1767	Yamato-no-kami (大和守)	Junior 5th Rank, Lower Grade (従五位下)	10,000 koku
6	Honjō Michiaki (本庄道揚)	1767–1771	Yamashiro-no-kami (山城守)	Junior 5th Rank, Lower Grade (従五位下)	10,000 koku
7	Honjō Michitoshi (本庄道利)	1771–1801	Kai-no-kami (甲斐守)	Junior 5th Rank, Lower Grade (従五位下)	10,000 koku
8	Honjō Michimasa (本庄道昌)	1801–1819	Shikibu-shoyu (式部少輔)	Junior 5th Rank, Lower Grade (従五位下)	10,000 koku
9	Honjō Michitsura (本庄道貫))	1819–1858	Ise-no-kami (伊勢守)	Junior 5th Rank, Lower Grade (従五位下)	10,000 koku
10	Honjo Michiyoshi (本庄道美)	1858–1871	Kunai-shōyu (宮内少輔)	Junior 5th Rank, Lower Grade (従五位下)	10,000 koku
