= Saitō Toshinaga =

Saitō Toshinaga (斎藤 利永, died June 16, 1460) was a Japanese daimyo during the Muromachi period. He was the head of the Saitō clan and uncle of daimyo Saitō Dōsan.

== Family ==
Toshinaga was the son of Saitō Sōen (斎藤宗円), shugo of Mino Province, and the older brother of Saitō Myōchin, making him the uncle of the daimyo Saitō Dōsan. By his first wife, he was the father of Saitō Toshifuji (斎藤利藤) and Saitō Noriaki (斎藤典明). His second wife, who was born into the Akamatsu clan, birthed Saitō Myōjun (斎藤妙純), Saitō Toshiyasu (斎藤利安), Saitō Toshitsuna (斎藤利綱) and Saitō Toshitaka (斎藤利隆).

== Life ==
In 1444, Sōen killed Mino Province's shugodai from the Tomishima clan (富島氏 Tomishima-shi) and started a civil war within the province. To support his father, Toshinaga built Izumii Castle to serve as the base for the Saitō clan. When Sōen was assassinated in 1450, Toshinaga assumed control of the clan and became the shugo of the province.

When the son of Toki Mochimasa (土岐持益) died in 1456, there was a dispute over who would become Mochimasa's successor. Mochimasa's grandson, who was only three years old at the time, was nominated to be the successor, but Toshinaga objected. Toki Shigeyori was eventually selected as the successor. Toshinaga died a few years later in 1460 from complications related to paralysis. He was succeeded by his first son, Toshifuji.
