= Jōzai-ji (Gifu) =

Buddhist temple in Gifu Prefecture, Japan

Coordinates: 35°25′56″N 136°46′15″E

Jōzai-ji 常在寺
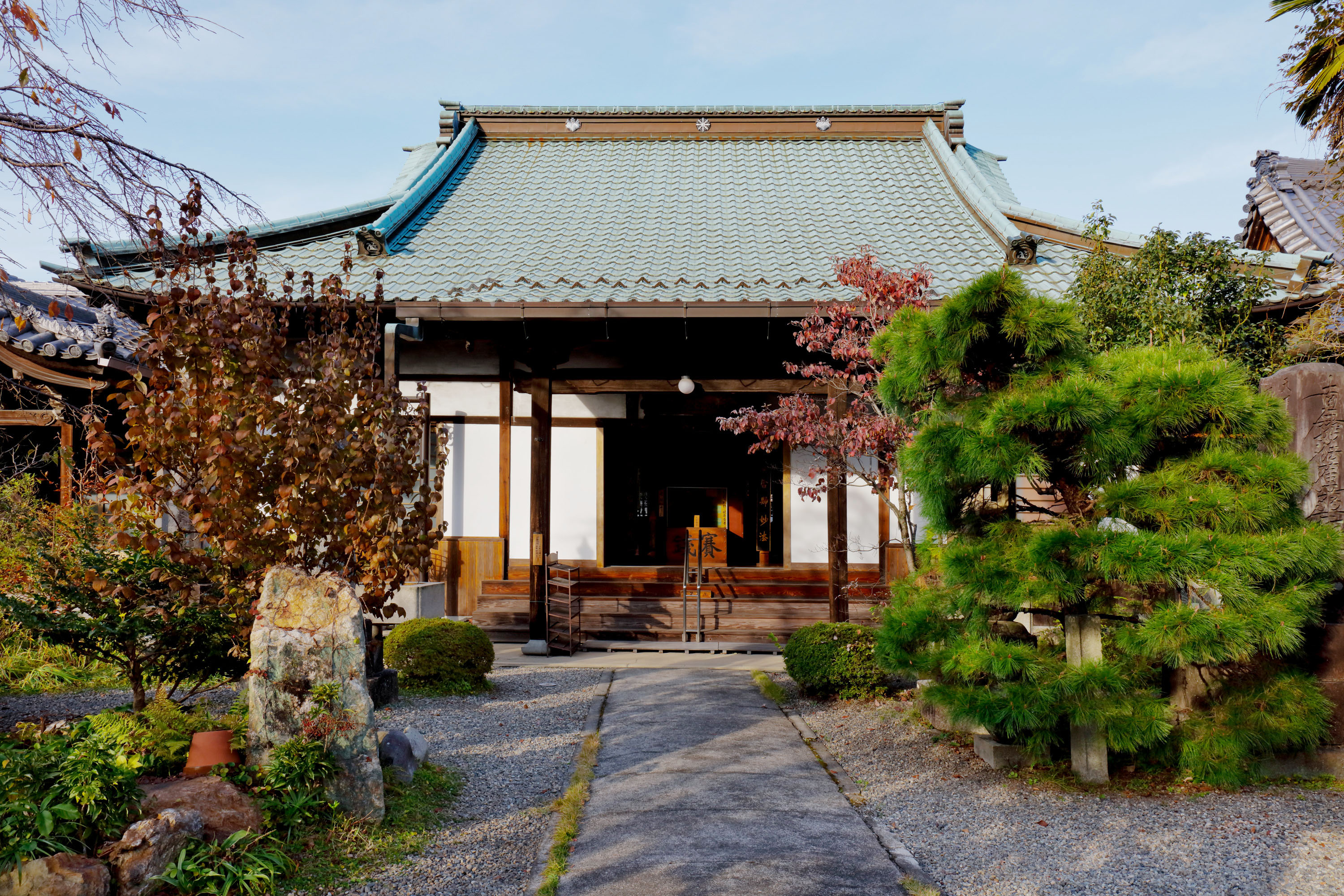
- Jozai-ji main temple building

Religion
- Affiliation: Nichiren sect

Location
- Location: 9 Kajikawa-chō, Gifu, Gifu Prefecture
- Country: Japan
- Interactive map of Jōzai-ji 常在寺

Architecture
- Completed: 1450

Jōzai-ji (常在寺) is a Buddhist temple of the Nichiren sect in Gifu, Gifu Prefecture, Japan. Its formal name is Shūrinzan Jōzai-ji (鷲林山常在寺). Starting with Saitō Dōsan, Jōzai-ji served as the family temple for the Saitō family for three generations, which included his son, Saitō Yoshitatsu, and his grandson, Saitō Tokugen. Also, it has been designated as a nationally Important Cultural Property, as it contains pictures of both Dōsan and Yoshitatsu.

== History ==
In 1450, Saitō Myōchin served as the guardian of upper Mino Province on behalf of the Toki clan. (Myōchin was the son of Saitō Sōen, who had earlier served as the guardian of Mino Province.) Using his power in the area, he built this temple.

Afterwards, as Japan entered the Sengoku period, Nagai Shinzaemon used the area around his temple as his base for uniting the region. Dōsan, his son, continued his father's base of operations for a second generation, designating Jōzai-ji the family temple.

== Gallery ==
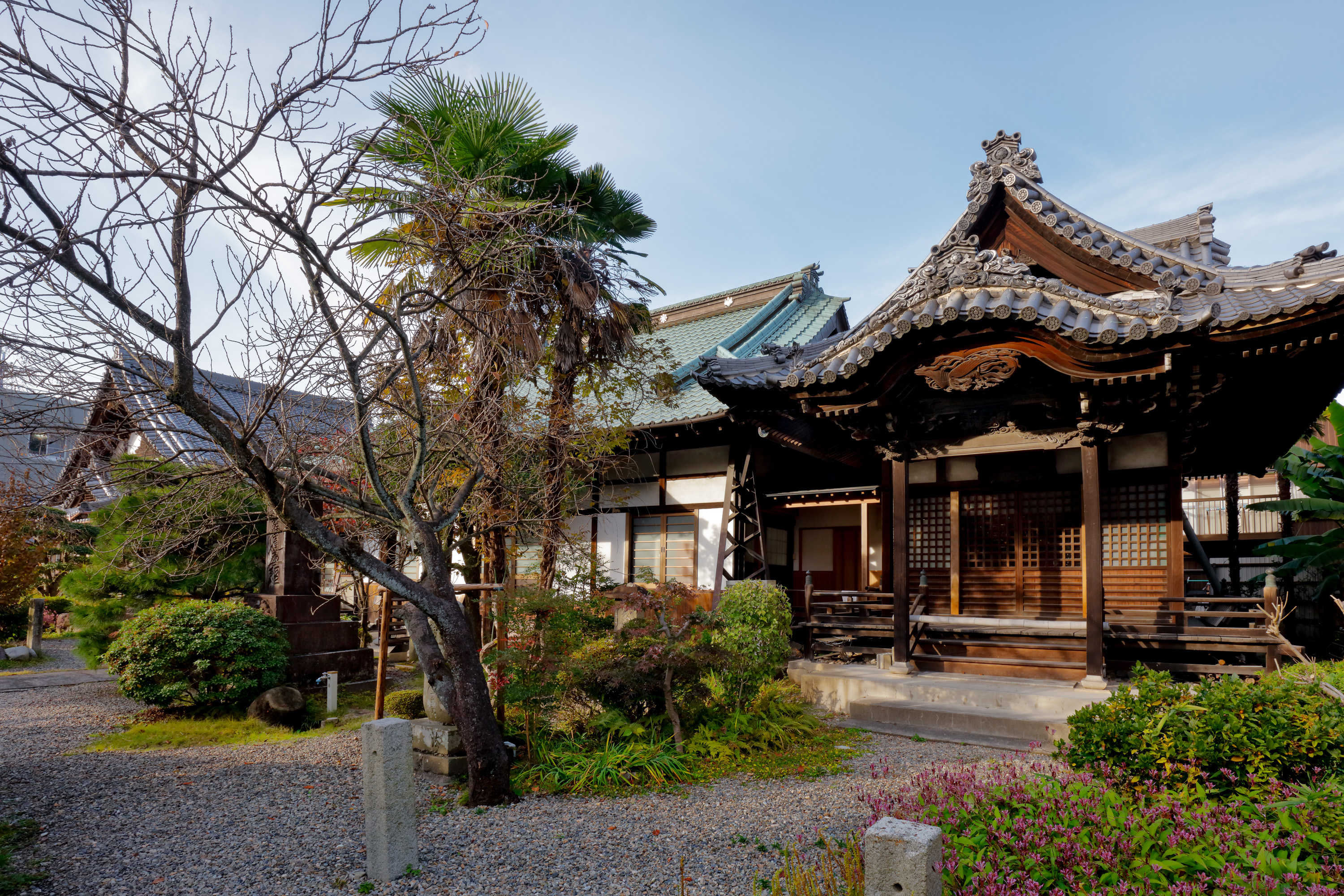

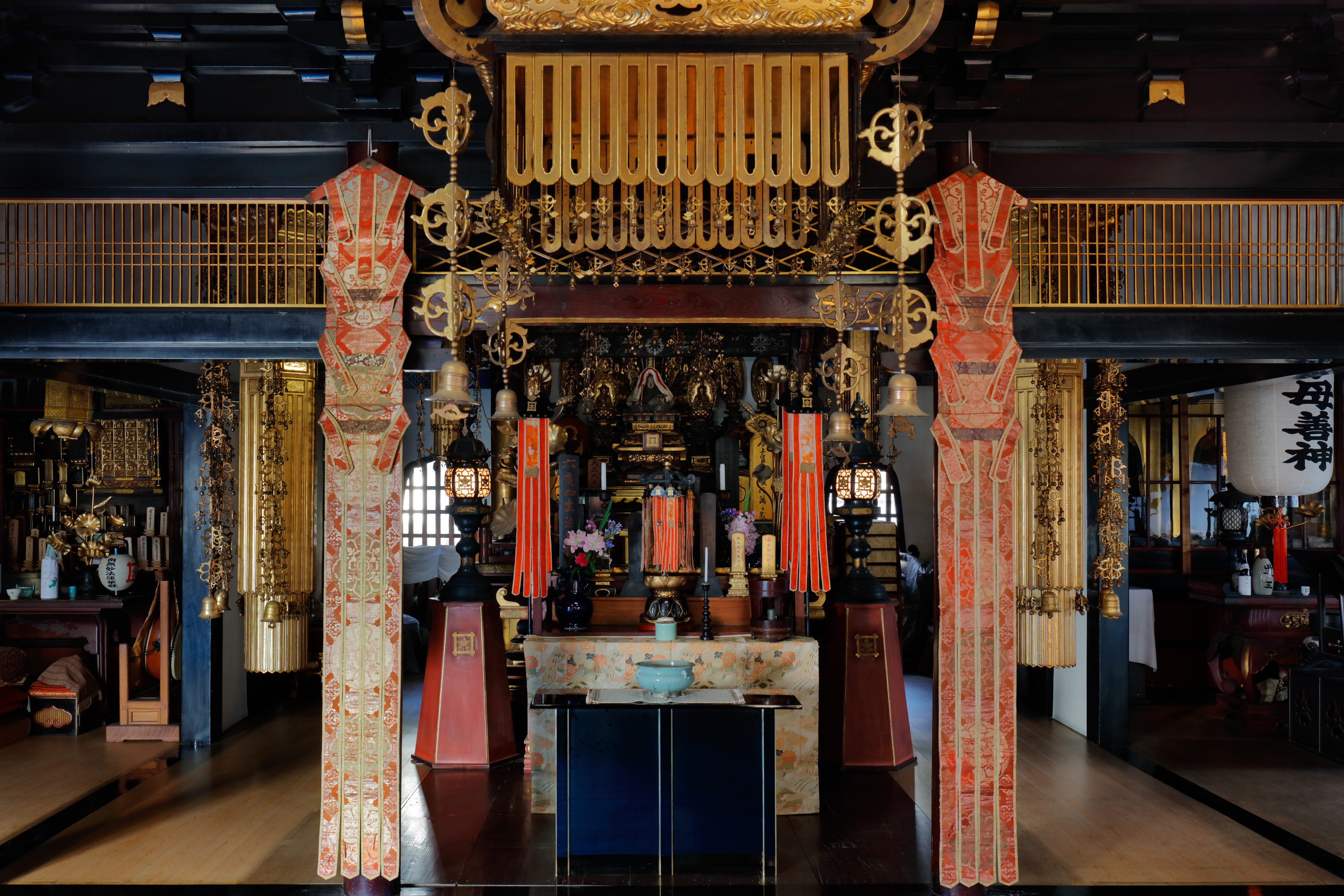

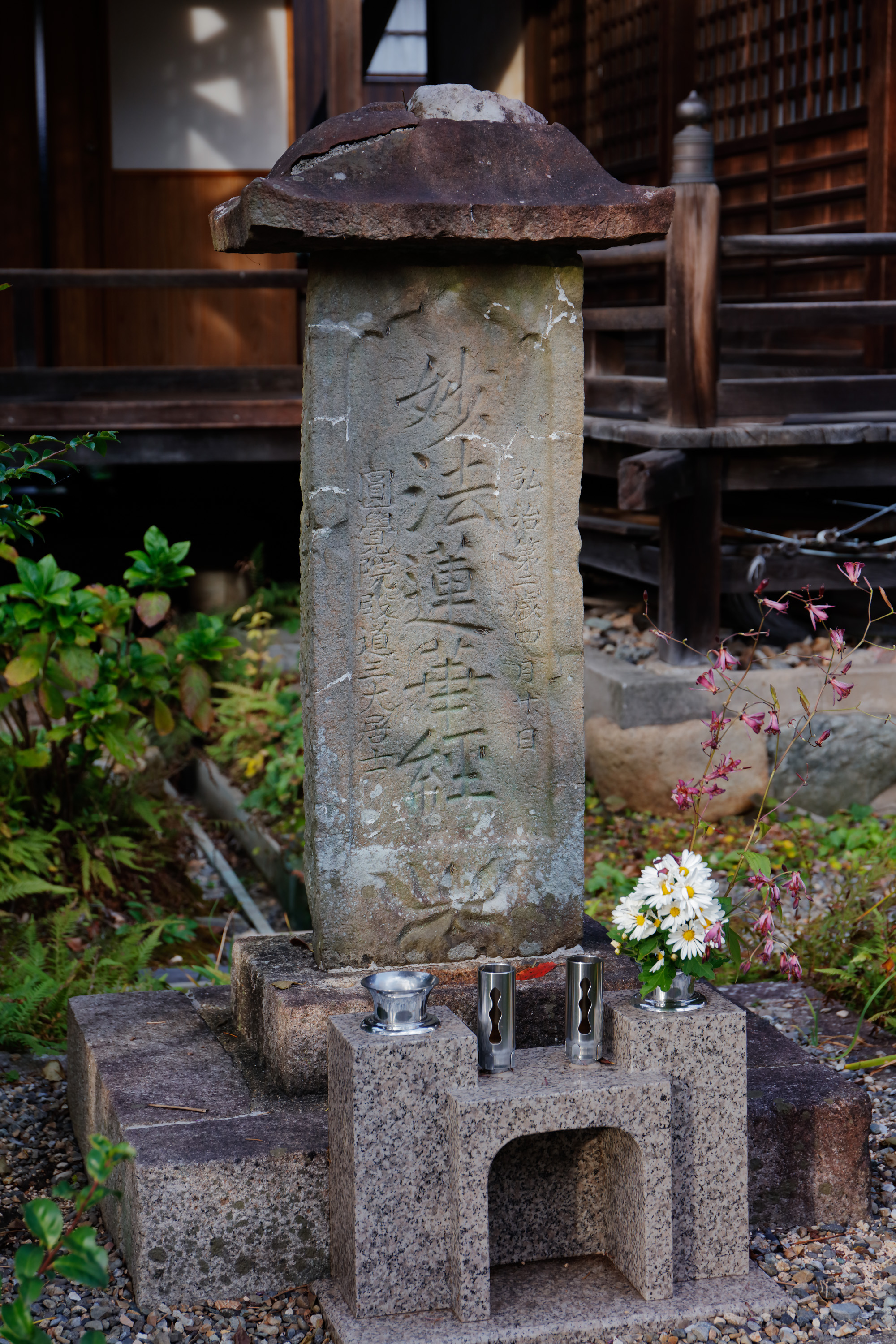
