= Toki Jurozayemon Mitsuchika =

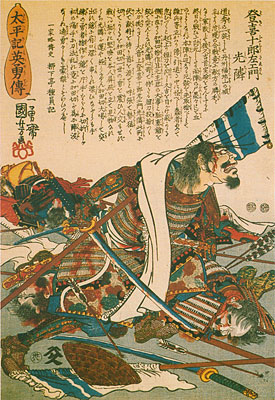

Toki Jurozayemon Mitsuchika (登喜十郎左衛門光隣) (died 1582) was a retainer of the Akechi clan and relative of Akechi Mitsuhide. He was the lord of Fukuchiyama in Tanba Province as well as a general who fought against Toyotomi Hideyoshi at the Battle of Yamazaki in 1582. He was killed in the battle.
