= Kawate Castle =

Building in Gifu Prefecture, Japan

Coordinates: 35°23′44″N 136°45′46″E

Kawate Castle 川手城
- Gifu, Gifu Prefecture, Japan
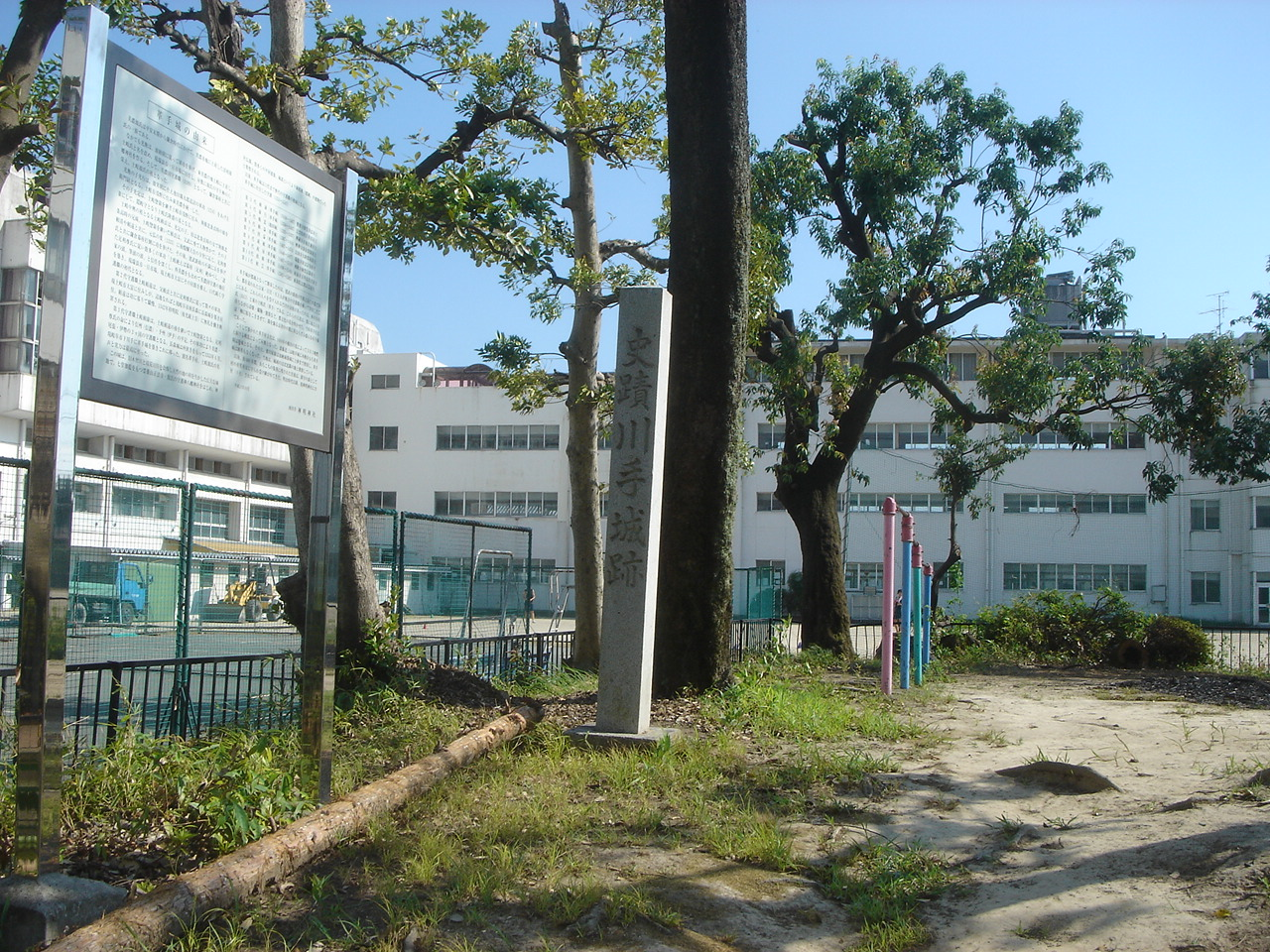
- A marker for the castle's location near a local high school

Location

Site history
- Built: 1353
- Built by: Toki Yorinari
- In use: 1353–1530
- Demolished: ca. 1530

Kawate Castle (川手城, Kawate-jō) was a castle that existed between the Nanboku-chō period and the Sengoku period. Its ruins are located in the present-day city of Gifu, Gifu Prefecture, Japan. An alternative way to write its name in Japanese is 革手城, which has the same pronunciation. It replaced Nagamori Castle as the base of operations for the area and served as home for regional shugo until Saitō Dōsan switched to Inabayama Castle. After its demolition, earthen mounds still remained, but they, too, were broken down to help with the construction of Kanō Castle.
