= Toki Masafusa =

Toki Masafusa (土岐 政房, 1467 – July 12, 1519) was a Japanese samurai warrior of the Sengoku period.

Masafusa was the son of Toki Shigeyori.

Masafusa was the shugo or governor of Mino Province.

He was the father of Toki Yoshiyori.

== See also ==
- Toki clan
