= Saitō Yoshitatsu =

Japanese samurai during the Sengoku period

- 斎藤 義龍
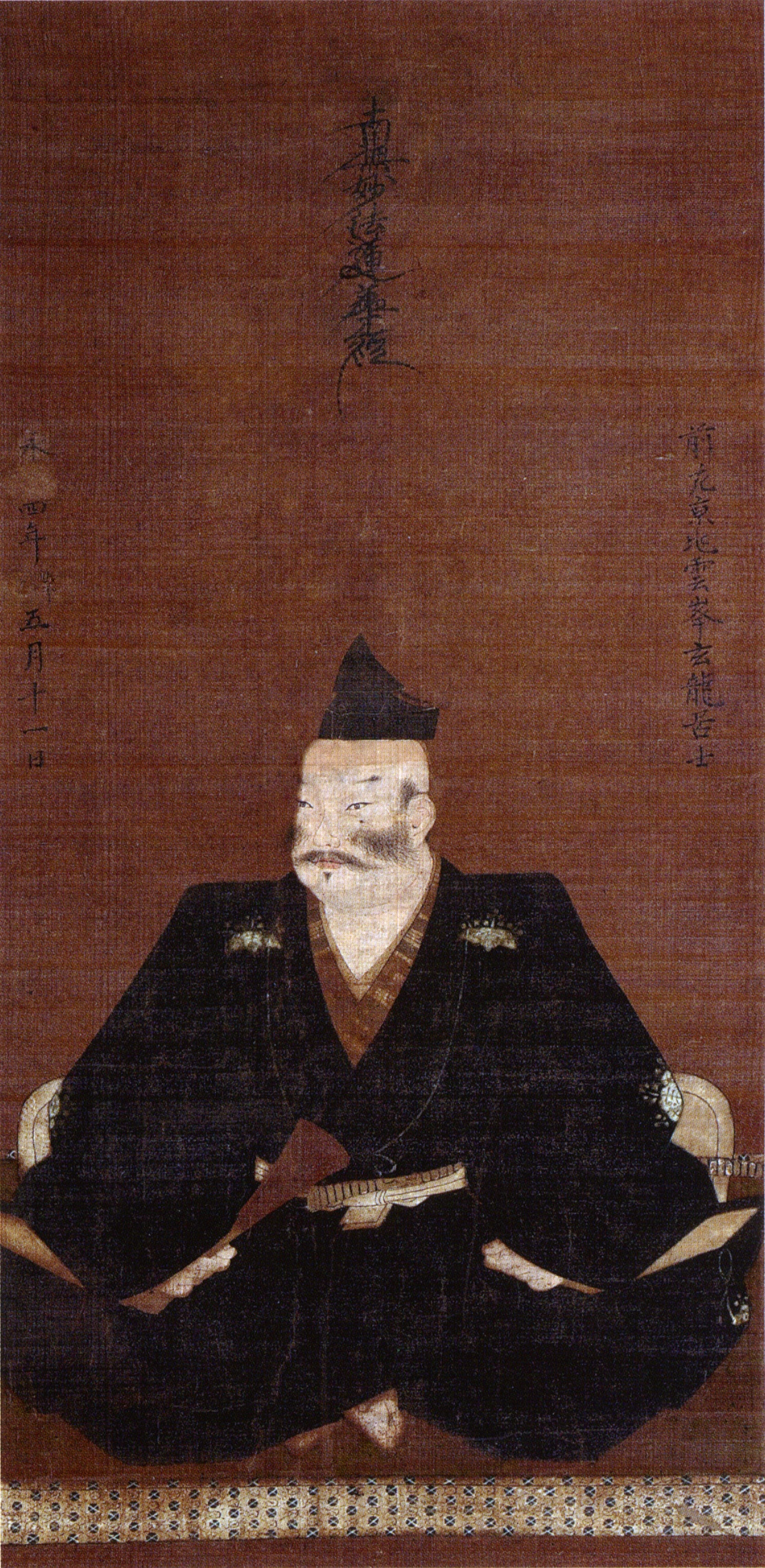

Head of Saitō clan
- In office 1556–1561
- Preceded by: Saitō Dōsan
- Succeeded by: Saitō Tatsuoki

Personal details
- Born: 8 July 1527
- Died: 23 June 1561 (aged 33)
- Relations: Saitō Dōsan (adopted father)
- Children: Saitō Tatsuoki
- Parent: Toki Yoshiyori (father)

Military service
- Allegiance: Saitō clan
- Battles/wars: Battle of Nagara-gawa (1556)

Saitō Yoshitatsu (斎藤 義龍; 8 July 1527 – 23 June 1561), also known as Toki Yoshitatsu, was a Japanese samurai and daimyō during the Sengoku period. He proved a capable commander and was able to defeat attempts by Oda Nobunaga to avenge his father-in-law Dôsan's death, but died of his illness in 1561.

== Biography ==
Yoshitatsu was the son of Saitō Dōsan. However, rumors that Yoshitatsu was in fact not Dōsan's real son (that is, that he was actually the son of Toki Yorinari (Toki Yoshiyori), the shugo of Mino Province who Dōsan displaced in influence) persisted--with Dōsan apparently considering naming one of his other sons, Nagatatsu, as heir. Yoshitatsu had come to suspect his father's intentions. Though he actually did suffer from leprosy, Yoshitatsu feigned illness and murdered his two younger brothers in 1555, declaring war on Dōsan.

In May 1556, at the Battle of Nagara-gawa, Yoshitatsu led an army to the Nagara river, prompting Dōsan to take up a position on the opposite side of the river. Yoshitatsu's vanguard opened the attack by crossing the river and cutting deeply into Dosan's ranks. They nearly reached Dōsan's headquarters before being savaged by a counterattack. Yoshitatsu then led the bulk of his forces across the river. In the course of the fighting, Dōsan was killed.

Yoshitatsu thereafter assumed control of Mino until he died in 1561. Yoshitatsu's son, Saitō Tatsuoki, was defeated by Oda Nobunaga in 1567 at the Siege of Inabayama; and the clan disappeared.
