= Toki Yorinari =

Japanese samurai (1502–1582)

Toki Yorinari

Toki Yorinari (土岐 頼芸; 1502–1582), also known as Toki Yoriaki, was a Japanese samurai warrior of in the Sengoku period. He was shugo of Mino Province. He may be equivalent to Toki Yoshiyori (土岐 頼芸; 1502–1583), also described as a Japanese samurai warrior of in the Sengoku period.

Yoshiyori was a son of Toki Masafusa. After the death of his father, Yoshiyori became head of the Toki clan in Mino Province. He had Ōkuwa Castle built.

Yorinari was the father of Toki Jirō who was killed by Saitō Dōsan., Yoshiyori was rumoured to be the real father of Toki Yoshitatsu (1527–1561), who went into exile in 1542. Yorinari was forced out of Mino by Saitō Dōsan.
