= Toki clan =

Samurai clan

Toki clan 土岐氏
- The emblem (mon) of the Toki clan
- Home province: Mino
- Parent house: Seiwa Genji
- Titles: Various
- Founder: Toki Yorisada (Minamoto no Mitsunobu)
- Cadet branches: Asano clan Akechi clan Seyasu clan Ibi clan Hidase clan Osu clan Tawara clan Toyama clan Funaki clan Fumizuki clan

The Toki clan (土岐氏, Toki-shi) is a Japanese kin group.

== History ==
The Toki claim descent from Minamoto no Yorimitsu and the Seiwa Genji.

As governors of Mino Province during the Muromachi period, Toki was the seat of the Toki clan.

The Toki founded Zen Buddhist temples, including Shōhō-ji and Sōfuku-ji in the city of Gifu.

Minamoto no Mitsunobu, a fourth generation descendant of Yorimitsu, was installed in Toki; and he took the name Toki Yorisada, whose maternal grandfather was Hōjō Sadatoki, shikken of the Kamakura shogunate, fought against the Southern Dynasty with Ashikaga Takauji.

From the Muromachi period to the Sengoku period, the Toki clan ruled Mino Province. Toki Yasuyuki was shugo (governor) of Mino, Owari and Ise. When shōgun Ashikaga Yoshimitsu had tried to take Owari from him, Yasuyuki refused and fought for two years (1389–1391).

Toki Shigeyori sided with the Yamana clan during the Ōnin War and, in 1487, invaded the southern part of Ōmi Province. The principal line of the Toki lost their possessions in 1542 during the civil wars that decimated Mino Province. Toki Yorinari (then governor of Mino) was defeated by Saitō Dōsan.

Toki Sadamasa (1551–1597) earned distinction fighting in the forces of Tokugawa Ieyasu's army. In 1590, he was named head of Sōma Domain (10,000 koku) in Shimōsa Province). Sadamasa's son Toki Sadayoshi (1579–1618) was moved in 1617 to Takatsuki Domain (30,000 koku) in Settsu Province. In 1619, his descendants were transferred to Soma; in 1627 to Kaminoyama Domain in Dewa Province; in 1712 to Tanaka Domain in Suruga Province; and finally, from 1742 to 1868 in Numata Domain (35,000 koku) in (Kōzuke Province).

=== Cadet branches ===
Several clans claim descent from the Toki, including the Asano, Akechi, Seyasu, Ibi, Hidase, Osu, Tawara, Toyama, Fumizuki and Funaki.

== Select list ==
The first six clan heads lived in Kyoto and Settsu Tada before receiving the Mino province. The next seven clan leaders lived in Toki. Starting with Toki Yorisada, the clan heads were also the shugo of Mino Province.

=== Pre-Mino ancestors ===
1. Emperor Seiwa (清和天皇) – the 56th Emperor of Japan
2. Teijun Shinoh (貞純親王)
3. Tsunemoto Ō (経基王) – the 6th grandson of Emperor Seiwa, Chinjufu Shogun defeated Taira Masakado
4. Tada Minamoto Mitsunaka (多田源満仲) – Founder of Settsu Tada Genji
5. Minamoto no Yorimitsu (Raikō) (源頼光) – Chinjufu-shōgun, famous with Oeyama Oni Taiji and Tsuchigumo
6. Minamoto Yorikuni (源頼国)

=== Initial Mino rulers ===
1. Minamoto no Kunifusa (源国房)
2. Minamoto no Mitsukuni (源光国)
3. Minamoto no Mitsunobu (源光信)
4. Minamoto no Mitsuki (源光基)
5. Toki Mitsuhira (土岐光衡)
6. Toki Mitsuyuki (土岐光行)
7. Toki Mitsusada (土岐光定)

=== Shugo of Mino Province ===
1. Toki Yorisada (土岐頼貞) (1271–1339)
2. Toki Yoritō (土岐頼遠) (died December 29, 1342)
3. Toki Yoriyasu (土岐頼康) (1318 – February 3, 1388)
4. Toki Yasuyuki (土岐康行) (died November 8, 1404)
5. Toki Yoritada (土岐頼忠) (died 1397)
6. Toki Yorimasu (土岐頼益) (1351–1414)
7. Toki Mochimasu (土岐持益) (1406–1474)
8. Toki Shigeyori (土岐成頼) (1442–1497)
9. Toki Masafusa (土岐政房) (1457 – September 12, 1519)
10. Toki Yoritake (土岐頼武) (1488–1536)
11. Toki Yorinari (土岐頼芸) (1502 – December 28, 1582)
12. Toki Yorizumi (土岐頼純) (1524 – December 28, 1547)
13. Toki Yorinari (was shugo twice)
