= Anōshū =

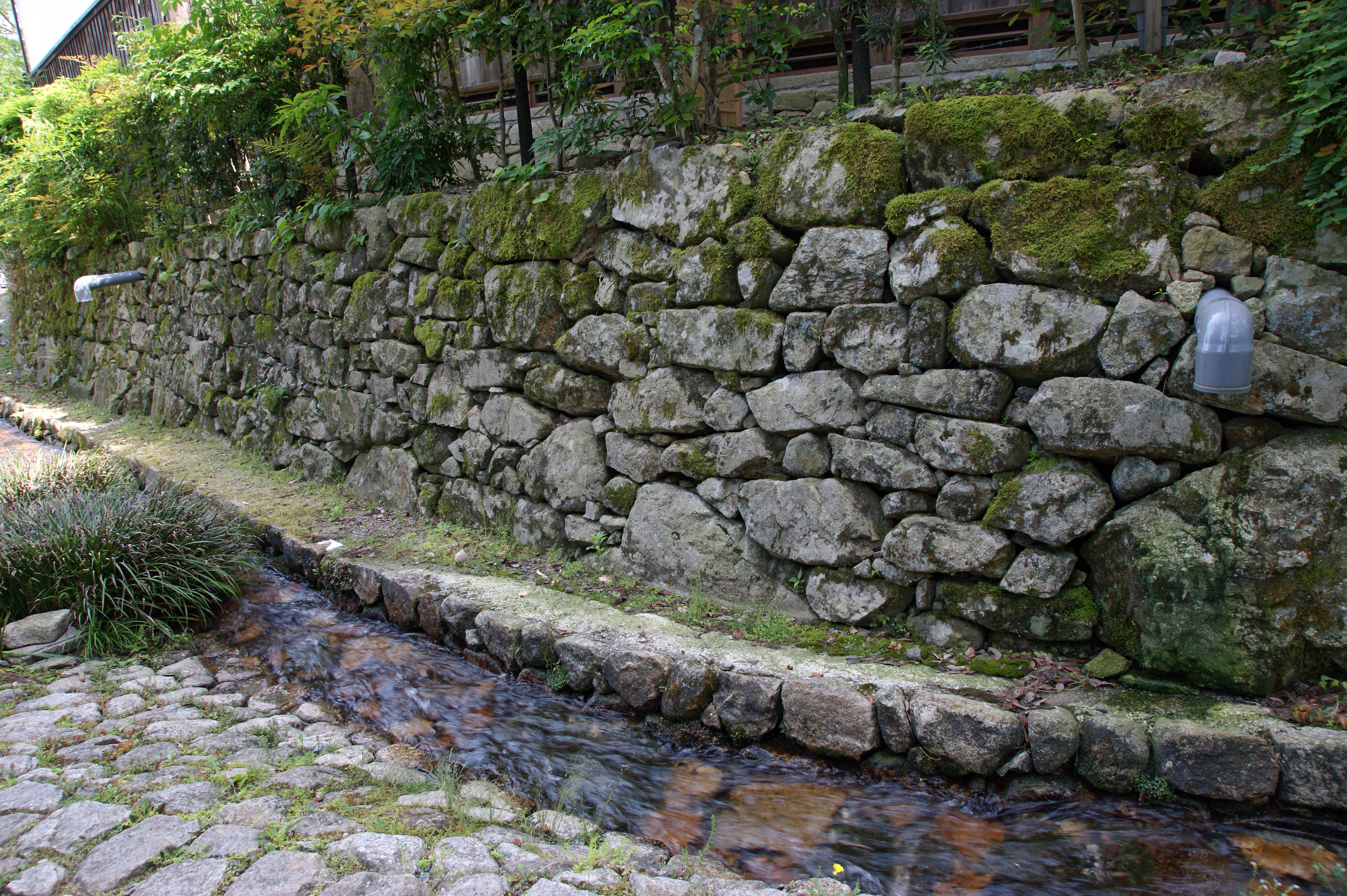
The stone walls that still remain in Ano, Sakamoto, Otsu, Shiga, Japan

The Anōshū (Japanese: 穴太衆) or the Anō groups were the stonemasonry engineers who were active in the Azuchi-Momoyama and early Edo periods, of the late 16th to the 17th centuries in Japan. They were mainly engaged in building the stone walls and moats of the temples and castles, that can be still observed today in Japan. They were from Anō, a village in Sakamoto (坂本), Ōmi Province, now included in the city of Ōtsu, just east of Kyoto.

The Anōshū apparently gained their stonemasonry experience by working on the stone walls of the Enryaku-ji Buddhist Temple nearby, and Oda Nobunaga's Azuchi Castle, built from 1576 to 1579, as one of the first large-scale castles in Japan.

Two clans were prominently recognized among the Ano groups. The Goto Clan (後藤家), which originated from Goto Mootsugu (ja:後藤基次), was involved in building Osaka Castle and Kanazawa Castle in Kaga Domain, now iIshikawa Prefecture. The Awata Clan (粟田家), established in the early Edo period with Awaya Kichibei (阿波屋喜兵衛) as its founder, has worked on the maintenance of the Enryaku-ji, Hikone Castle and other prominent castles, and was incorporated as Awata Construction in 1964. It has recently expanded its business overseas, such as in the stone walls that surround Rolex Customer Center in Dallas, Texas.

== See also ==
- Walls and foundations of Japanese castles
