= Nirengi Castle =

- 二連木城
- Toyohashi, Aichi Prefecture, Japan
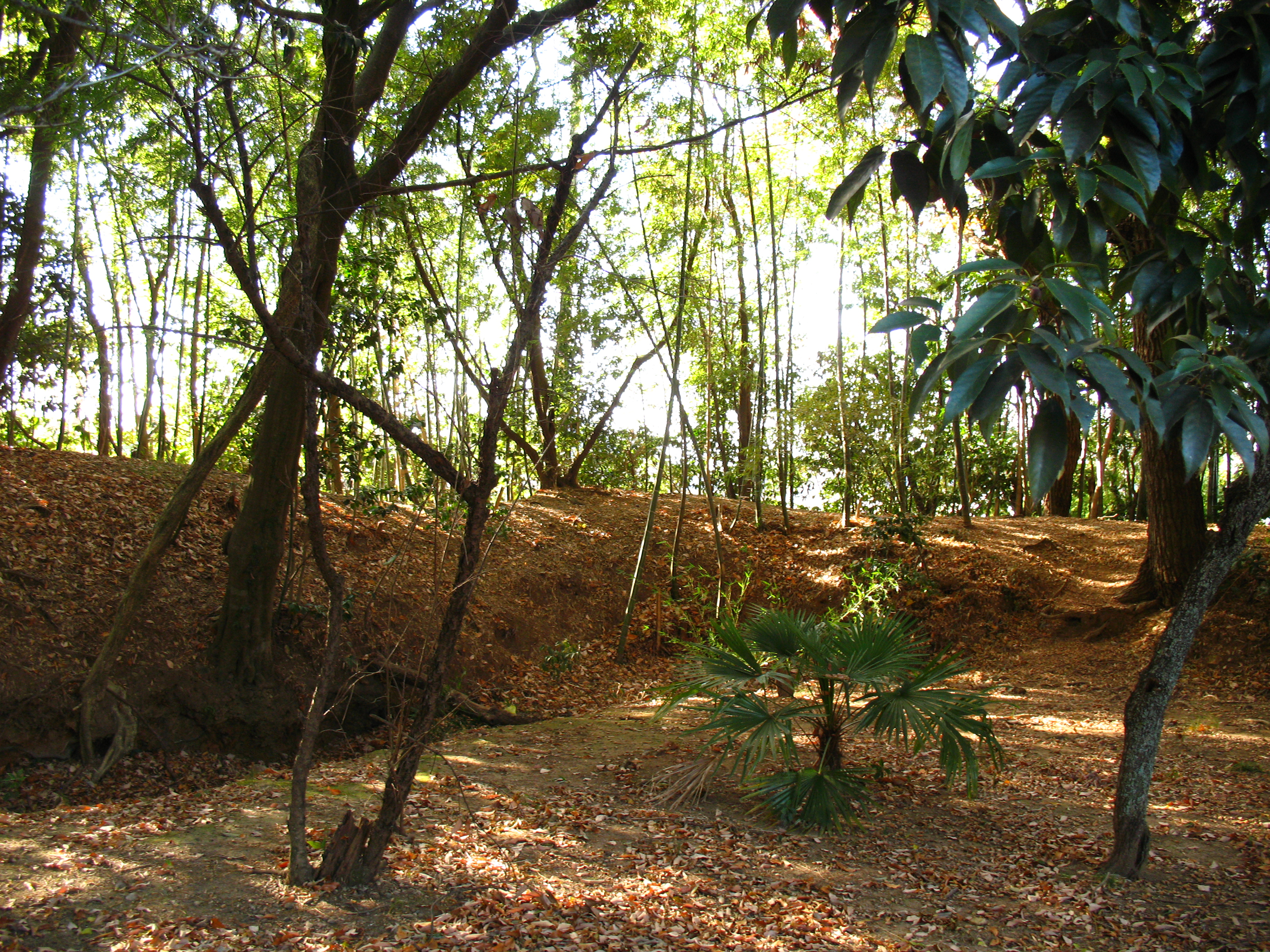
- Earthen ramparts at the site of Nirengi Castle.

Site information
- Type: Flatland castle (平城)
- Controlled by: Toyohashi city, Aichi prefecture
- Open to the public: 24/7
- Condition: Site made over into Oguchi Park. Ramparts, stone walls, and dry moat still extant.

Location
- Location of Nirengi Castle site, Toyohashi, Japan.
- Coordinates: 34.770014°N 137.414847°E

Site history
- Built: 1493
- Built by: Toda Munemitsu 戸田宗光
- In use: 1493–1590
- Materials: Earth, wood, stone.

Nirengi Castle (二連木城, Nirengi-jō) was a Japanese castle in what is now the city of Toyohashi, Aichi Prefecture, during the Sengoku period. There are no extant structures left; however, a park was built on the site where the castle once stood, and a stone monument and some explanatory signboards were erected by the city.

The name of the castle and the surrounding area, Nirengi, means "Two Elm Trees" in Japanese, after the elm trees (連の木, ren-no-ki) which once grew abundantly in the region.

== History ==
In 1465, Toda Munemitsu (c. 1439–1508), a retainer of the Ashikaga shogunate was ordered to advance from Kyoto into Mikawa Province, to hunt down members of the Maruyama and Ōhira families and to subdue the area. Munemitsu started with the Chita peninsula, and proceeded southeast around Mikawa Bay and into the Atsumi peninsula, where he constructed Ōtsu Castle in 1479 and Tahara Castle in 1480 as bases for the prosecution of his campaign. With the Atsumi area subdued, he left Tahara Castle in the care of his eldest son, Norimitsu, and turned his attention to the east.

Munemitsu built Nirengi Castle in 1493 as a forward base against the eastern forces of Tame Matasaburo, who had built the mountaintop Funagatayama Castle in 1492. From Nirengi, Munemitsu devoted himself to the task of crushing his enemies. In 1505, Makino Kohaku built Imabashi Castle. Although only two kilometers separated Nirengi and Imabashi Castles, numerous battles occurred over the next few years on the fields between them. Finally, Munemitsu was able to compel the head of the Makino family to become a Buddhist priest, and then forced an alliance with the Makino. Although the Toda clan was able to persevere, Munemitsu died in 1508.

Leadership of the clan passed to Norimitsu who had, sometime in the 1490s, secured the alliance of the Saigo clan by marrying the daughter of Saigo Masasada. Norimitsu moved his residence into Nirengi Castle, and oversaw the highpoint of the Mikawa-Toda house, in about 1508. In 1529, 19-year-old Matsudaira Kiyoyasu attacked Imabashi Castle, and after a fierce battle, was able to take it. The day after his triumphal entry, Kiyoyasu turned his attention to other fortifications in the area, including Ina Castle and Nirengi Castle. Through successive intermarriages, the Toda eventually became a branch house of the Matsudaira.

In 1571, Takeda Shingen launched a general invasion of the provinces held by Tokugawa Ieyasu with an army of 25,000 troops. As the Takeda entered Tōtōmi Province, Ieyasu sent for help from Oda Nobunaga and then began to march west from Hamamatsu Castle toward Yoshida Castle. Defense of Yoshida Castle and the east Mikawa region was commanded by Sakai Tadatsugu, whom Shingen knew to be a formidable tactician. Once in Mikawa, Shingen recognized that the confluence of the Toyogawa and the Asakura river, just above Mikawa Bay, as an important strategic point that had to be taken. Yoshida Castle sat on the banks overlooking the confluence, while Nirengi castle, as a branch castle in the area, was about two kilometers to the east, situated on the bank of the Asakura. At Nirengi Castle, Ieyasu personally led his heavily outnumbered rear guard against the Takeda forces in a delaying action. After a fierce battle, Tokugawa retreated from Nirengi Castle toward Yoshida Castle. With reinforcements from the Oda clan, Ieyasu was able to rally his troops, fight off the Takeda, and recover Nirengi and other castles that had fallen to the enemy.

Following the Siege of Odawara (1590), proprietary rights to the area were transferred to Toyotomi Hideyoshi, while Tokugawa Ieyasu and his loyal forces moved east and took possession of the Kantō region. Toda Yasunaga, the last castle lord, relinquished possession of Nirengi Castle in 1590 when he followed Ieyasu to the east. Custody of east Mikawa was assigned to Ikeda Terumasa, who took up residence in Yoshida Castle. As Mikawa province was then surrounded by lands under the control of Hideyoshi or his vassals, many of the castles in the region became redundant. Nirengi Castle was thereafter abandoned.

During the Edo period, lower class and impoverished samurai in the area used the wood of the elm trees around the castle site to craft wooden pestles, a traditional kitchen utensil in Japan. These pestles, or surikogi, were (and continue to be) used to crush and grind sesame seeds, spices, or other dry ingredients. The samurai craftsmen sold these pestles to merchants, just as samurai across Japan did with specific items made of locally available materials, in order to supplement the meagre stipend they received from their daimyō.

=== Modern Era ===
After the Meiji Restoration, all feudal domains were turned over to the state, including the long-abandoned ruins of Nirengi Castle. In 1911, the first mayor of Toyohashi, Ōguchi Yoshimutsu, acquired the land and raised orchards on it. After the end of World War II, the Ōguchi Family lived for a while on the land, in a small house (6 x 3 tatami mats) called Kazaki-an (風樹庵), which can be translated as "Wind-Among-the-Trees Hermitage". In 1961, the city acquired the property and established it as Ōguchi Park. In 1977, it was renovated, so that the park could be enjoyed in the spring for its plum trees, and in the autumn for its fragrant herbs.

Currently, the park is on the site of the Main Courtyard (Hon-maru), and the Senior Citizens’ Welfare Center is on the site of the Secondary Courtyard (Ni-no-maru). Remnants of the earthen ramparts can be seen around the Main Courtyard, and a portion of the original dry moat remains at the base of the slope below the Main Courtyard.

== Castle design ==
Nirengi Castle was built on a terraced area near the banks of the Asakura River. The main courtyard (本丸, hon-maru) was about 600 square meters. The family's official residence was located in the North Courtyard. The Secondary Courtyard ni-no-maru (二の丸) lay to the east of the Main Courtyard, and was bounded by the East and South Enclosures. Each of these sections were separated from the others by earthen ramparts and moats.

== Bibliography ==
- Kobayashi, Sadayoshi; Makino, Noboru (1994). 西郷氏興亡全史 [Complete History of the Rise and Fall of the Saigo Clan] (in Japanese). Tokyo: Rekishi Chosakenkyu-jo.
