= Sister castle =

Agreement between castles for the purpose of promoting cultural exchange

A sister castle or twin castle relationship is the castle equivalent of sister city, between two geographically distinct castles, usually by agreement between two local governments famous for castles.

Some Japanese castles establish sister relationships with not only domestic castles but also European castles.

== Details ==
On 26 March 2015, Conwy Castle in Wales was twinned with Himeji Castle. Both castles are World Heritage Sites.

The term friendship castle alliance (友好城郭) is also used, but it is distinguished from sister castle(姉妹城) like the examples of Himeji Castle and Osaka castle.

== List of sister castles and friend castles ==
Sister castle relationship(姉妹城)
Friendship castle alliance(友好城郭)

Date	Castle 1	Distinction	Castle 2	Distinction	ref.
1966, 15 August	(Japan) Hikone Castle	National Treasure National Special Historic Site of Japan	(Japan) Takamatsu Castle	Important Cultural Property National Historic Site of Japan National Place of Scenic Beauty	
1983, 29 April	(Japan) Nagahama Castle	-	(Japan) Osaka Castle	Important Cultural Property National Special Historic Site of Japan	
1985, 2 November	(Japan) Osaka Castle	Important Cultural Property National Special Historic Site of Japan	(Japan) Wakayama Castle	Important Cultural Property National Historic Site of Japan National Place of Scenic Beauty	
1989, 2 November	(Germany) Marksburg	World Heritage Site	(Japan) Maruoka Castle	Important Cultural Property	
1989, 11 May	(France) Château de Chantilly	Monument historique	(Japan) Himeji Castle	World Heritage Site National Treasure National Special Historic Site of Japan	
2006, 10 October	(Japan) Osaka Castle	Important Cultural Property National Special Historic Site of Japan	(Japan) Ueda Castle	National Historic Site of Japan	
2009, 2 October	(Austria) Schloss Eggenberg	World Heritage Site	(Japan) Osaka Castle	National Historic Site of Japan Special Historic Sites	
2015, 26 March	(Japan) Himeji Castle	World Heritage Site National Treasure National Special Historic Site of Japan	(Germany) Neuschwanstein Castle	World Heritage Site	
2017, 11 April	(France) Château des ducs de Bretagne	Monument historique	(Japan) Osaka Castle	Important Cultural Property National Special Historic Site of Japan	
2019, 29 October	(Wales) Conwy Castle	World Heritage Site Listed building-Grade 1	(Japan) Himeji Castle	World Heritage Site National Treasure National Special Historic Site of Japan	
2022, 3 October	(Japan) Osaka Castle	Important Cultural Property National Special Historic Site of Japan	(Italy) Castello Sforzesco	-	
2024, 16 October	(Japan) Himeji Castle	World Heritage Site National Treasure National Special Historic Site of Japan	(Poland) Wawel Castle	World Heritage Site Historic Monument of Poland	
2025, 24 May	(Japan) Himeji Castle	World Heritage Site National Treasure National Special Historic Site of Japan	(Austria) Schönbrunn Palace	World Heritage Site	
2026, 1 April	(Japan) Matsumoto Castle	National Treasure National Historic Site of Japan	(France) Château de Chambord	World Heritage Site	

== See also ==
- Sister city
