= Shiōden Masataka =

- 四王天 政孝
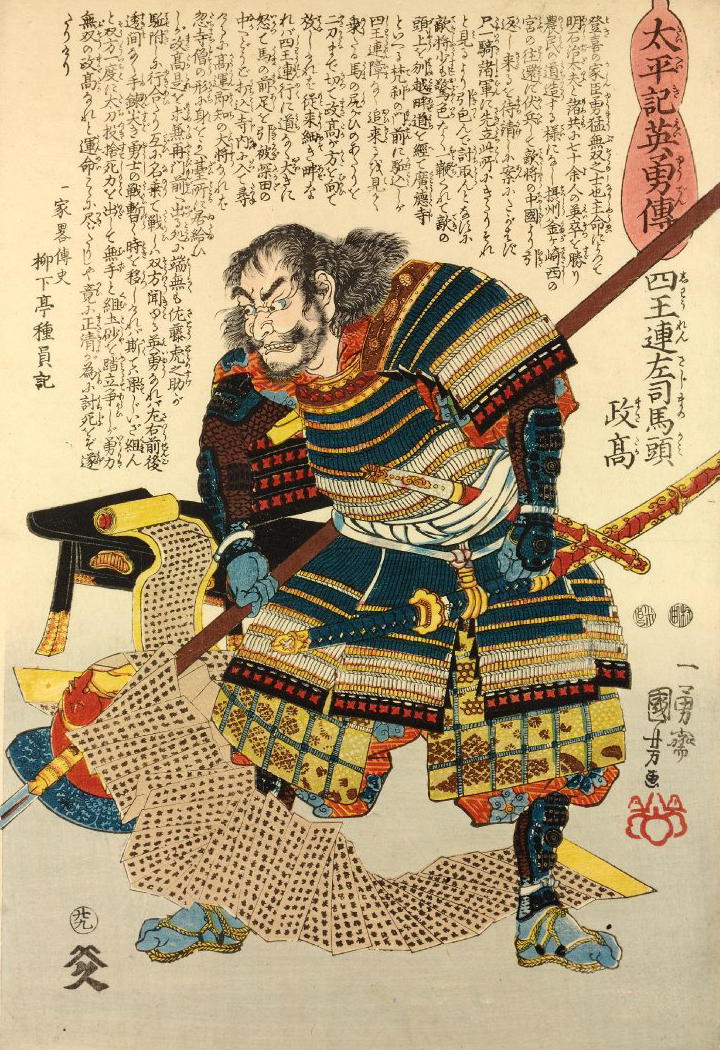
- Shiōden Masataka depicted by Utagawa Kuniyoshi

Personal details
- Born: c. 1540 Hirai Village, Tanba Province, Japan
- Died: July 2, 1582 Yamazaki, Yamashiro Province, Japan

Military service
- Allegiance: Akechi clan
- Years of service: c. 1570-1582

Shiōden Matabē Masataka (Japanese: 四王天 又兵衞 政孝; d. 1582) was a Japanese samurai general and retainer of Akechi Mitsuhide. His courtesy title was Tajima-no-kami (但馬守).

== Biography ==
Shiōden Masataka was born in Tanba Province. He was a member of the Shiōden clan, which itself descended from the ancient Yomoda clan (四方田氏) of Musashi Province.

According to some versions, during Akechi Mitsuhide's assault on Yakami Castle Shiōden engaged Hatano Hideharu in single combat and captured him alive.

After the conquest of Tanba Province by the Oda clan and their vassals the Akechi, Akechi Mitsuhide commissioned a number of his generals to various posts within the province. Shiōden and his brother Shiōden Masazane were appointed castellans of Fukuchiyama Castle along with a fief of 10,000 koku.

During the Honnō-ji Incident, Shiōden supported his lord Akechi in his betrayal of Oda Nobunaga. Masataka later took command of the assault on Nijō Castle, where Oda Nobutada had taken refuge.

Shiōden died at the Battle of Yamazaki on July 2, 1582.

== See also ==
- Shiōden Nobutaka
