= Akechi Mitsutada =

Japanese samurai (1540–1582)

- 明智 光忠

Lord of Yakami Castle
- In office 1579–1582
- Preceded by: Hatano Hideharu
- Succeeded by: Toyotomi Hidekatsu

Personal details
- Born: 1540
- Died: July 4, 1582 (aged 41–42)

Military service
- Allegiance: Oda clan Akechi clan
- Commands: Yakami Castle
- Battles/wars: Tanba Campaign (1575); Siege of Yakami Castle (1579); Honnoji Incident (1582); Battle of Yamazaki (1582)

Akechi Mitsutada (明智 光忠; 1540 – July 4, 1582) was a Japanese samurai of the Sengoku period who served the Akechi clan. He was a cousin of his lord, Akechi Mitsuhide. He was the castle commander of Yakami Castle.

Control over the Yakami Castle passed into Mitsutada's hands when the Hatano clan was obliterated by Akechi Mitsuhide in 1579.

Mitsutada also served under Mitsuhide during the Incident at Honnō-ji in 1582. He went on a mission for Mitsuhide to kill Oda Nobutada, the heir of Oda Nobunaga.

At the Battle of Yamazaki, he was shot during this attempt. He recuperated in a nearby temple. But he later committed suicide upon hearing of Mitsuhide's defeat.
