= Saitō Toshimitsu =

Samurai (1534–1582)

- 斎藤 利三
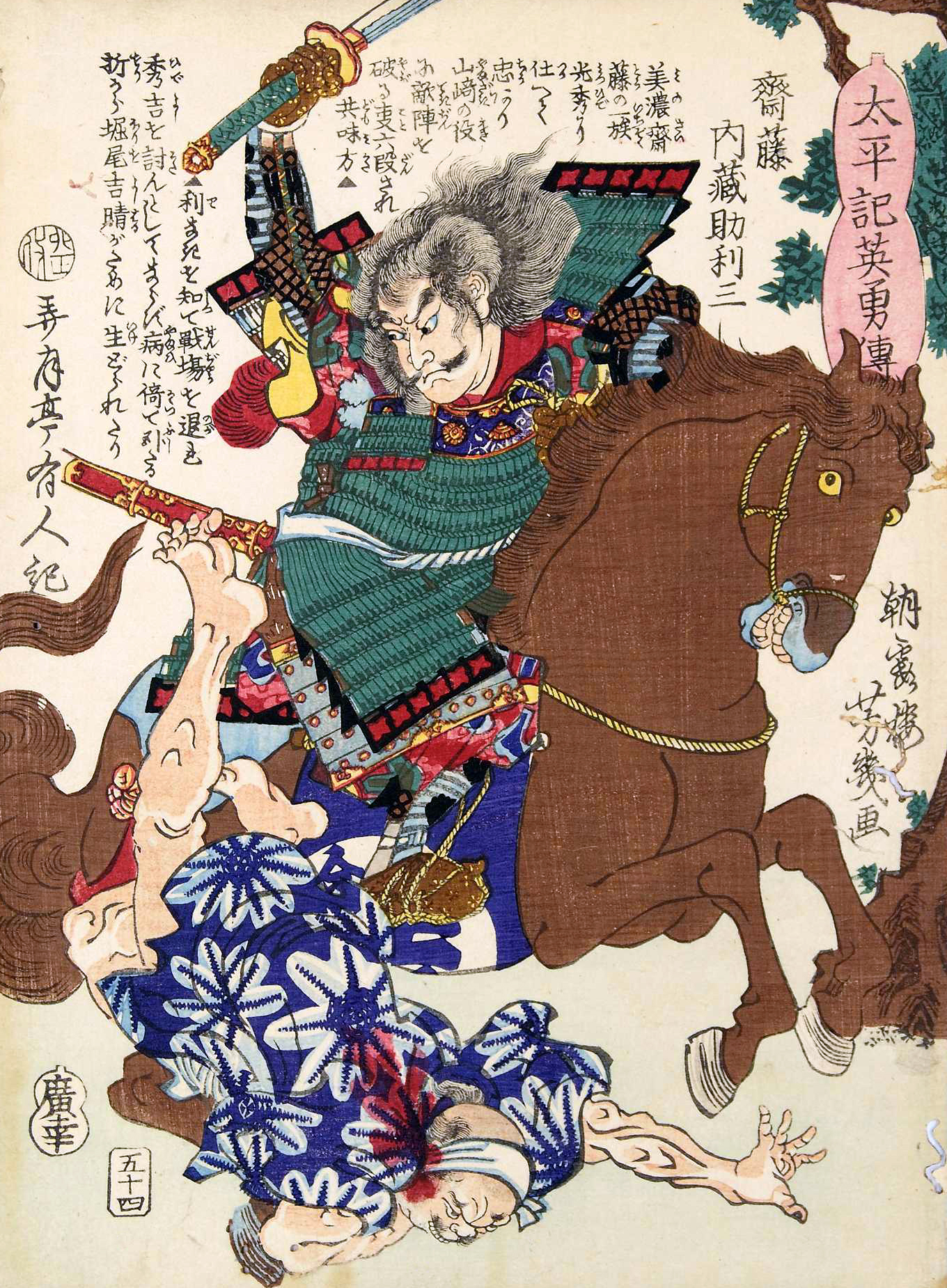
- Portrait of Saitō Toshimitsu from Utagawa Yoshiiku's Heroes of the Taiheiki

Lord of Kuroi Castle
- In office 1579–1582
- Preceded by: Akai Naomasa
- Succeeded by: Horio Yoshiharu

Personal details
- Born: 1534 Mino Province
- Died: July 6, 1582 (aged 47–48)
- Children: Lady Kasuga

Military service
- Allegiance: Saitō clan Inaba clan Akechi clan
- Commands: Kuroi Castle
- Battles/wars: Tanba Campaign (1575); Siege of Kuroi Castle (1579); Honnoji Incident (1582); Battle of Yamazaki (1582)

Saitō Toshimitsu (斎藤 利三; 1534 – July 6, 1582) was a Japanese samurai of the Sengoku period and commander of Kuroi Castle. He was a retainer of Inaba Ittetsu, but later joined Akechi Mitsuhide.

Oda Nobunaga was not pleased that Toshimitsu chose to work under Mitsuhide, and if not for Mitsuhide's intervention, Nobunaga would have killed him.

Toshimitsu was also vital in Akechi's betrayal at Honnō-ji and at the Battle of Yamazaki.

He was the father of the Lady Kasuga, who became a preeminent retainer of the Tokugawa shogunate.

== See also ==
- Saito Toshikazu
