= Hideharu =

- Gender: Male

Origin
- Origin: Japanese
- Meaning: Different meanings depending on the kanji used

Hideharu (written: 秀治) is a masculine Japanese given name. Notable people with the name include:

- Hatano Hideharu (波多野 秀治; 1541–1579), Japanese daimyō
- Hideharu Miyahira (宮平 秀治; born 1973), Japanese ski jumper
