= Kuroi Castle =

Castle in Japan

- 黒井城
- Tamba, Hyōgo, Japan
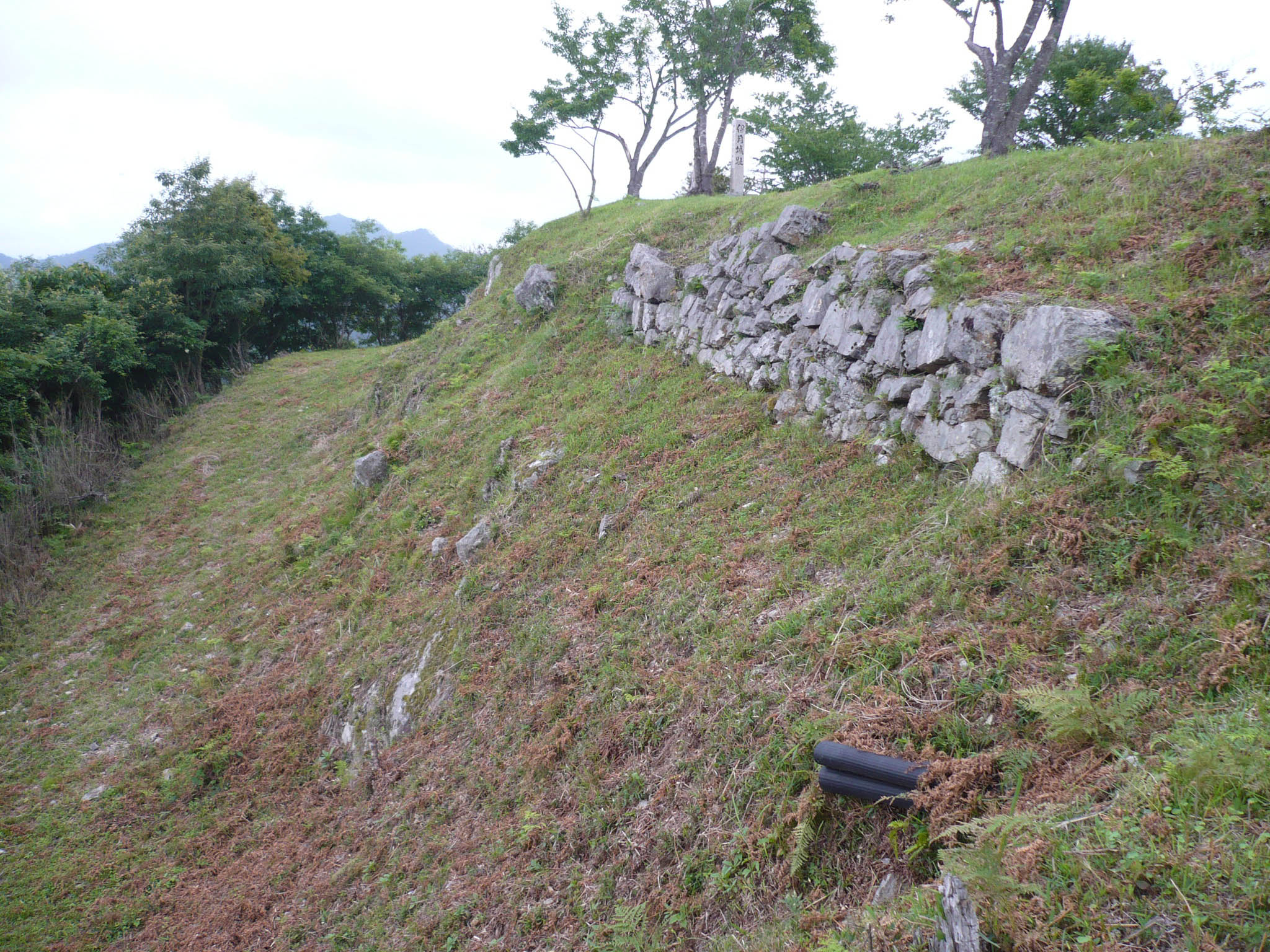
- Stone wall of Honmaru Base

Site information
- Type: Yamajiro-style Japanese castle
- Owner: Akai clan, Akechi clan
- Condition: ruins

Location
- Kuroi Castle Kuroi Castle (Japan)
- Coordinates: 35°10′45.0″N 135°6′14.6″E

Site history
- Built: 14c
- Built by: Akamatsu Norisada
- Materials: Stone walls
- Demolished: 1584
- Events: Battle of Kuroi Castle

Garrison information
- Past commanders: Akai Naomasa, Saitō Toshimitsu, Horio Yoshiharu
- National Historic Site of Japan

Kuroi Castle (黒井城, Kuroi-jō) was a Sengoku period Japanese castle located in what is now the Kasuga-cho neighborhood of the city of Tamba Hyōgo Prefecture, Japan. It was also called Hogetsu Castle (保月城, Hogetsu-jō) or Hōzuki Castle (保築城, Hōzuki-jō). Famous as the birthplace of Lady Kasuga, the wet nurse of Tokugawa Iemitsu, it ruins have been protected as a National Historic Site since 1989.

== History ==
Kuroi Castle is located on a 350-meter mountain at the middle of Hikami basin, protected on three sides by rivers. the valley is a cul-de-sac to the northwest of the Sasayama basin, which contained Sasayama Castle. Spreading across three ridges of the mountain, the castle was one of the largest in Tanba Province, along with Yakami Castle and Yagi Castle. A fortification was originally built in this location in the early Muromachi period by the Akamatsu clan, who ruled the area for around 120 years. It then came into the hands of the Ogino clan, a cadet branch of the Akai clan, who in turn were a cadet branch of the Inoue clan, originally from Shinano Province. Originally a minor clan, in the Sengoku period, as the power of the Hosokawa clan, the shugo of Tajima province and the Naito clan, the deputy shugo both waned due to internal conflicts and the aftermaths of the Onin War, the Akai clan expanded rapidly under its aggressive new chieftain, Akai Naomasa. Known as the "Red Demon" of Tanba, Akai Naomasa seized Kuroi Castle in 1554 by killing his grand-uncle, and over the next ten years expanded his holdings through marriage alliances, open warfare and stratagem to control the western half of the province. Using Kuroi Castle as his stronghold, he substantially expanded on its defenses. In 1570, Akai Naomasa dove back an invasion from the Yamana clan, shugo of Tajima Province, and in his counterattack invaded Tajima and seized Takeda Castle and Konosumiyama Castle. The Yamane clan had pledge fealty to Oda Nobunaga, and these events made Nobunaga wary of the aggressiveness of the Akai clan. However, Nobunaga was tied down in conflict with the Takeda clan of Kai Province and it was not until his victory at the Battle of Nagashino in 1575 that he was able to turn his attention toTanba Province. Nobunaga ordered his general, Akechi Mitsuhide to take control of the province. Mitsuhide attempted diplomacy and won over a number of the smaller local lords to his side; however, the Akai were adamant in their opposition, and Mitsuhide was forced to lay siege to Kuroi Castle for two months in the winter of 1575. In the early spring of 1576, Mitsuhide's forces were attacked from behind by Hatano Hideharu and he was forced to retreat back to Sakamoto Castle. Mitsuhide rebuilt his army and attacked Tanba again from March 1578, this time securing his rear by building Kinzan Castle between Kuni Castle and the Hatano stronghold of Yagami Castle to prevent a repeat of the previous campaign. Akai Naomasa died of illness soon after the start of the campaign, and with his death, the anti-Nobunaga alliance of minor lords in Tanba started to collapse.Yagami Castle fell in June 1579, and the isolated Kuroi Castle fell in August.

Mitsuhide placed his general Saitō Toshimitsu in charge of Kuroi Castle, and as the area as still threatened by Tajima Province, he had the defenses modernized with stone walls and extended. In 1580, Hashiba Hidenaga, the younger brother of Toyotomi Hideyoshi seized Tajima Province, expelling the Yamana clan and eliminating the threat to Kuroi Castle. In 1582, Mitsuhide staged his coup against Nobunaga (the Honnō-ji Incident). Saitō Toshimitsu was opposed and went with the plan somewhat reluctantly, and was captured and executed by Toyotomi Hideyoshi after Mitsuhide was defeated by Hideyoshi at the Battle of Yamazaki. Toshimitsu's daughter, Fuku (1579-1643), was born at the Saitō residence at Kuroi Castle, survived and married with Inaba Masashige. She later became wet nurse to Tokugawa Iemitsu and was named Lady Kasuga after the location of Kuroi Castle.

After Saitō Toshimitsu's death, Hideyoshi entrusted the castle to Horio Yoshiharu, but in 1583 he was transferred to Wakasa Province and Kuroi Castle was abandoned and allowed to fall into ruin.

All that remains of Kuroi Castle today and some fragmentary stone walls and earthworks. The entrance to the site is a 15-minute walk from Kuroi Station on the JR West Fukuchiyama Line and another 45 minute walk from entrance to the hilltop.

Kuroi Castle was listed as one of the Continued Top 100 Japanese Castles in 2017.

== Gallery ==
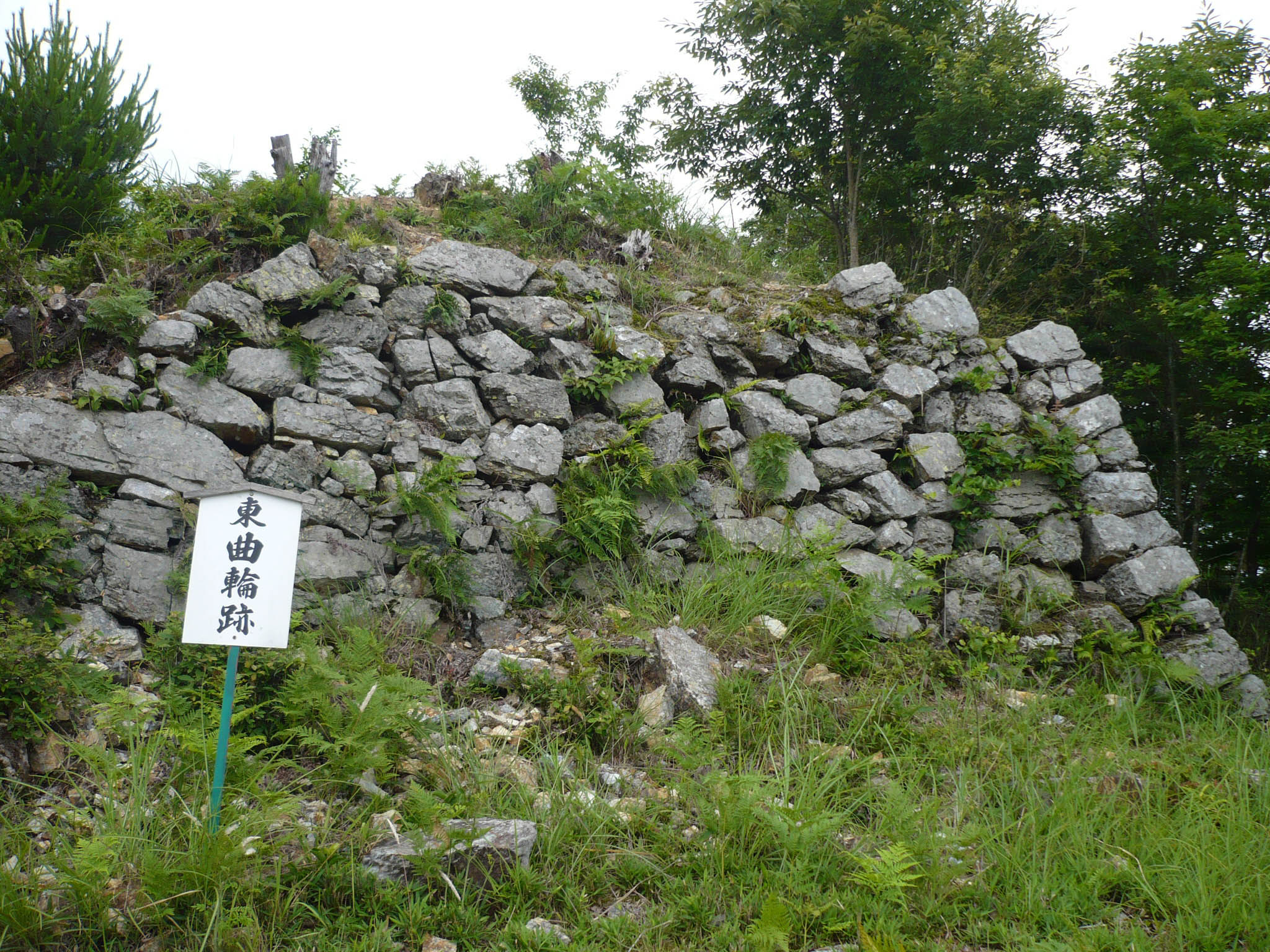
Stone wall of a Yagura Tower

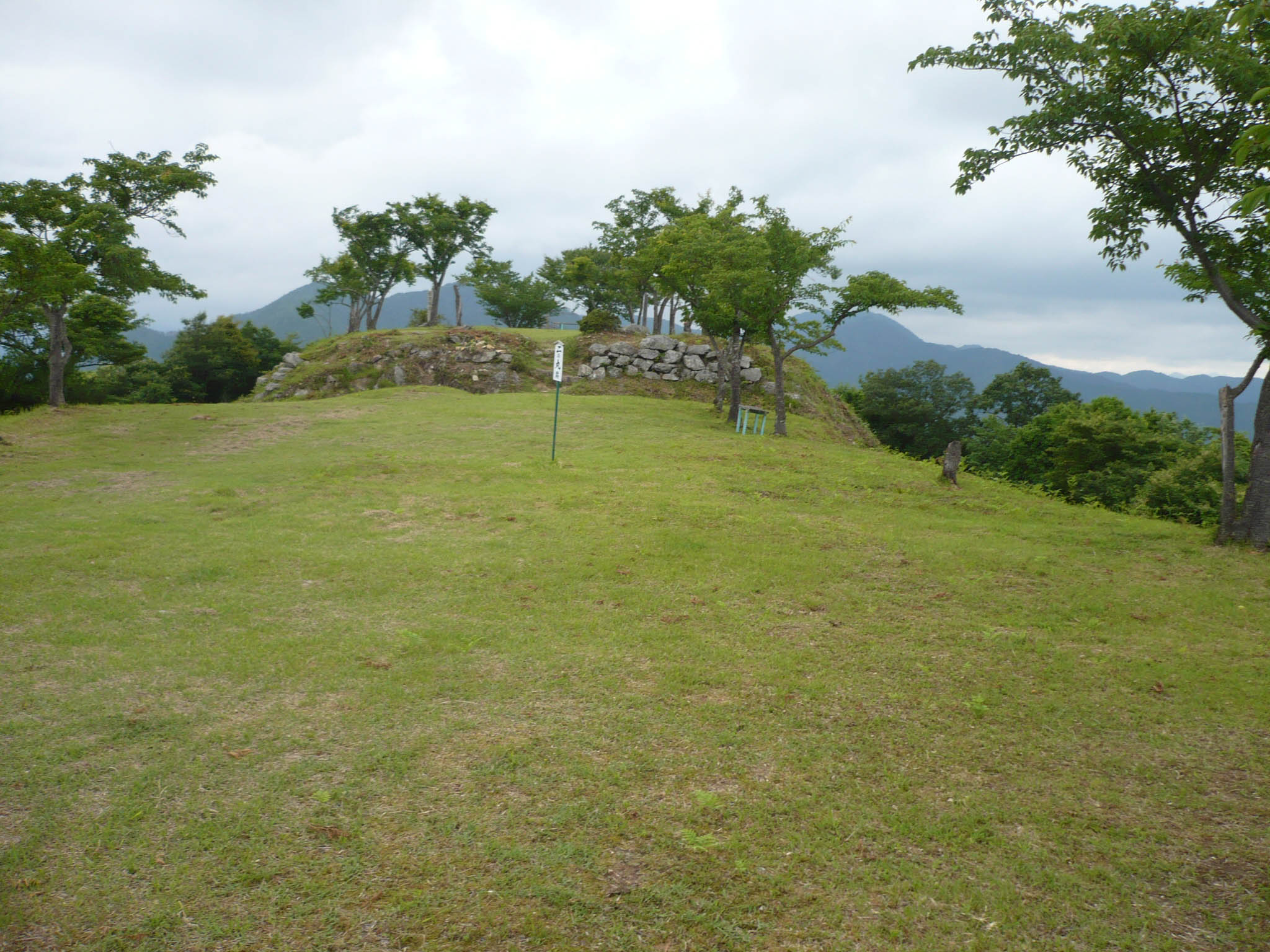
Ninomaru Base

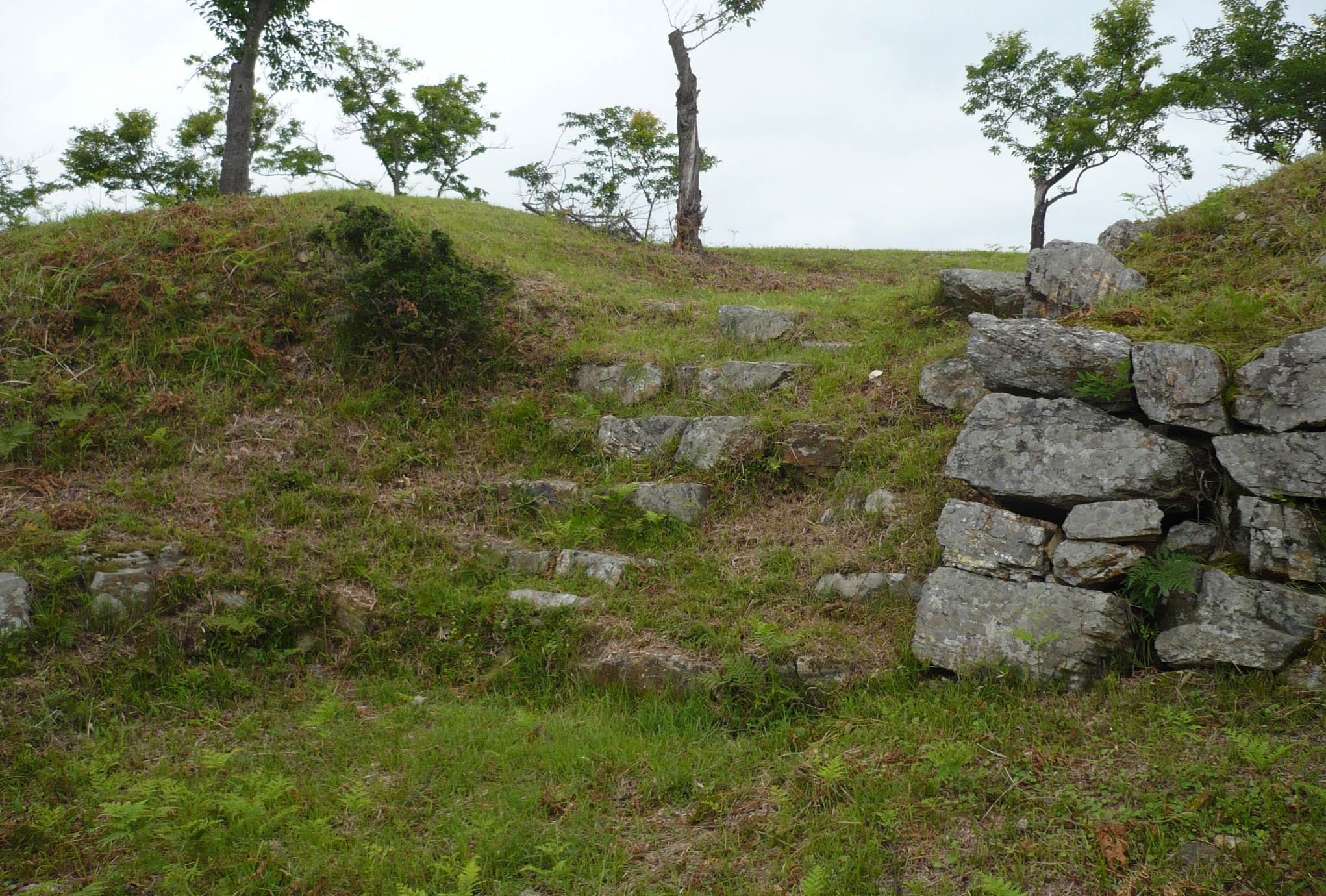
Gate of Honmaru Base

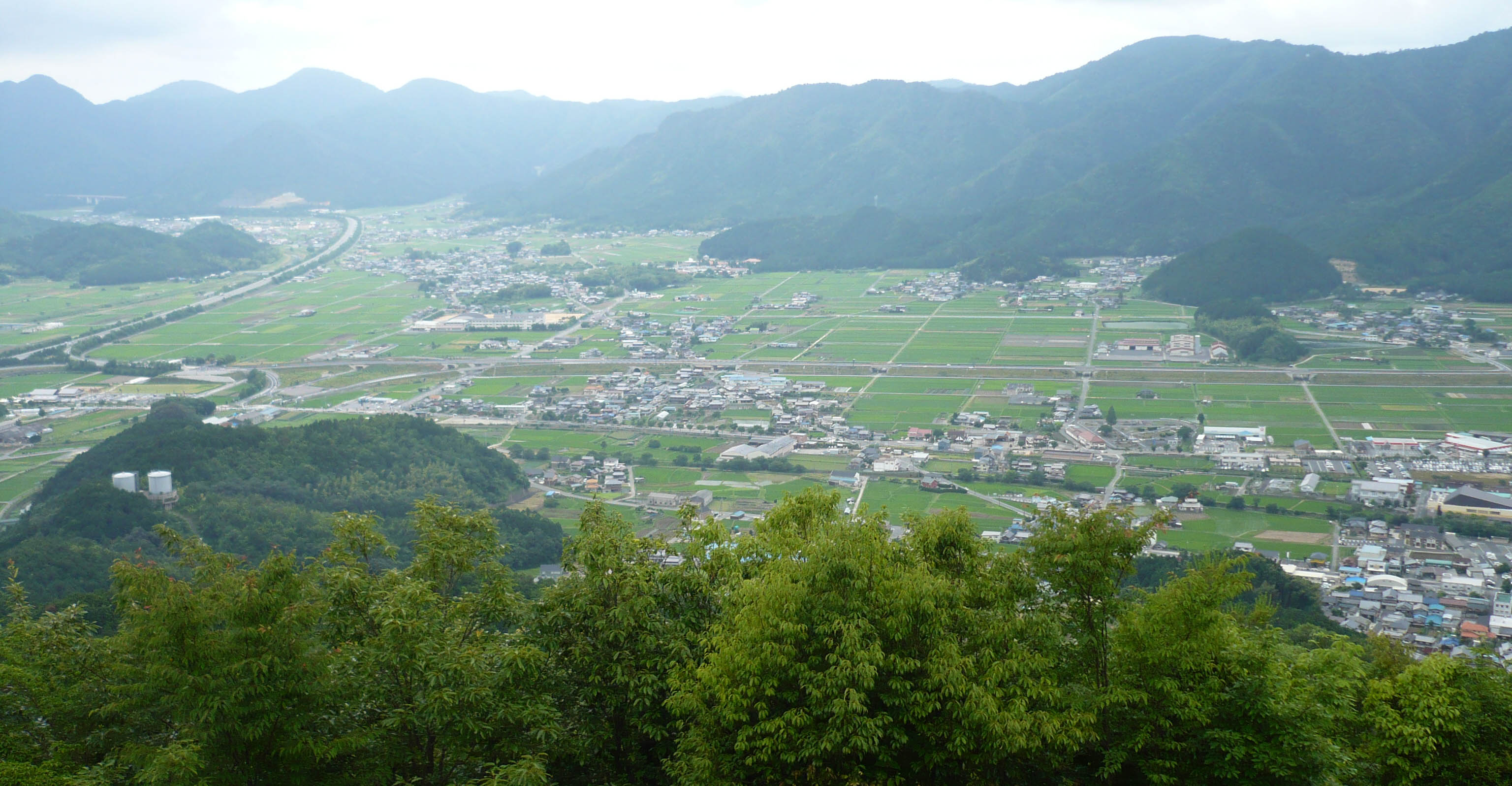
View from Honmaru Base

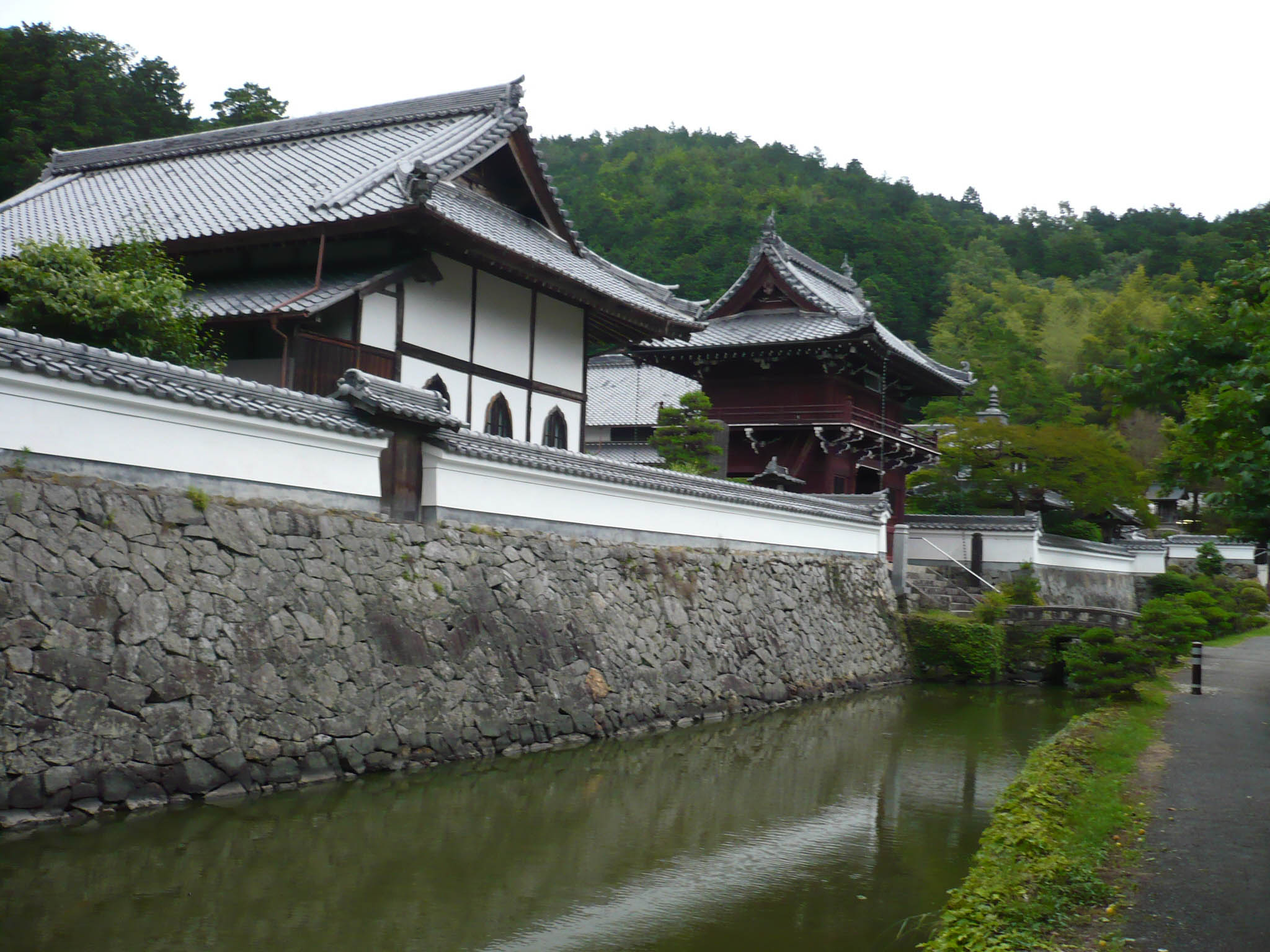
Kozenji Temple (Former residence of Saitō Toshimitsu)

== See also ==
- List of Historic Sites of Japan (Hyōgo)

== Literature ==
- De Lange, William (2021). An Encyclopedia of Japanese Castles. Groningen: Toyo Press. pp. 600 pages. ISBN 978-9492722300.
