= Akechi Mitsuhide =

16th-century samurai; assassin of Oda Nobunaga (1528–1582)

- 明智 光秀
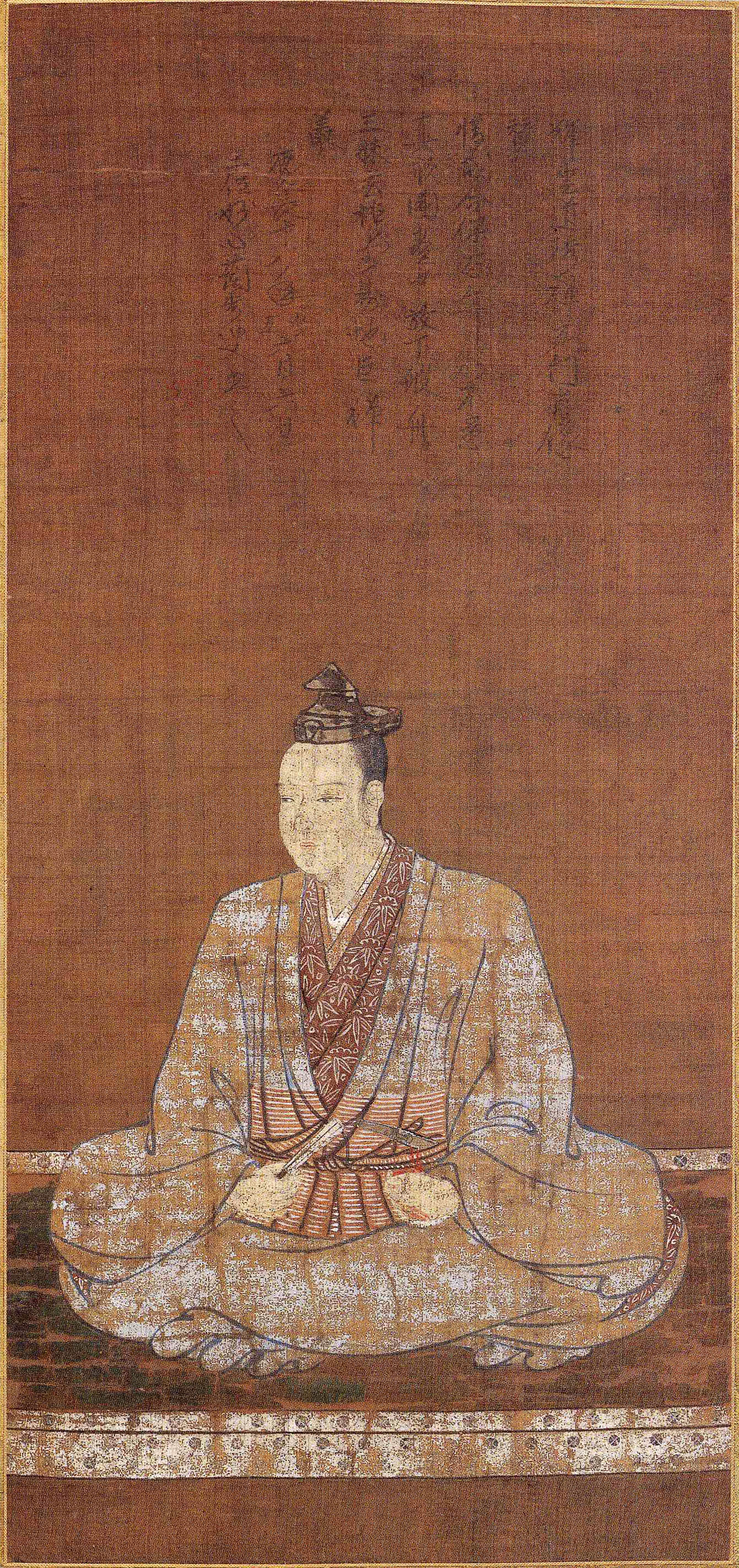

Lord of Kameyama Castle
- In office 1578–1582
- Succeeded by: Toyotomi Hidekatsu

Lord of Sakamoto Castle
- In office 1571–1582
- Succeeded by: Niwa Nagahide

Personal details
- Born: 10 March 1528 Tara Castle, Mino Province, Japan
- Died: July 2, 1582 (aged 54) Fushimi-ku, Kyoto, Japan
- Spouse: Tsumaki Hiroko
- Children: Akechi Mitsuyoshi; Akechi Tama at least one other daughter
- Parents: Akechi Mitsutsuna (father); Daughter of the Wakasa Takeda clan (mother)
- Relatives: Akechi Hidemitsu (son-in-law); Akechi Mitsutada (cousin)
- Nickname: "Jūbei" (十兵衛)

Military service
- Allegiance: Toki clan Saitō clan Ashikaga shogunate Oda clan
- Unit: Akechi clan
- Battles/wars: Battle of Nagaragawa; Battle of Honkoku-ji; Siege of Kanegasaki; Siege of Mount Hiei; Kawachi Campaign; Battle of Nagashino; Tanba Campaign; Ishiyama Hongan-ji War; Battle of Tedorigawa; Siege of Shigisan; Siege of Yakami Castle; Siege of Kuroi Castle; Honnō-ji Incident; Battle of Yamazaki

Japanese name
- Kanji: 明智 光秀
- Hiragana: あけち みつひで
Transcriptions
- Romanization: Akechi Mitsuhide

Akechi Mitsuhide (明智 光秀; March 10, 1528 – July 2, 1582), first called Jūbei from his clan and later Koretō Hyūga no Kami (惟任日向守) from his title, was a Japanese samurai general of the Sengoku period. Mitsuhide was originally a bodyguard of the last Ashikaga shōgun Ashikaga Yoshiaki and later, one of the trusted generals under daimyō Oda Nobunaga during his war of political unification in Japan.

Mitsuhide rebelled against Nobunaga for unknown reasons in the Honnō-ji Incident in 1582, forcing the unprotected Nobunaga to commit seppuku in Kyoto.

Mitsuhide attempted to establish himself as shōgun, but was pursued by Nobunaga's successor Toyotomi Hideyoshi and defeated at the Battle of Yamazaki. The 13-day reign of Mitsuhide is listed as the inspiration for the yojijukugo set phrase mikkatenka (三日天下; short-lived (Note: According to the Sanseido reference, 三日 should be understood not literally as three days, but as "ごく短い期間", e.g. an exceptionally short period of time) reign).

He is still popular in present culture. A ceremonial activity in his honor was held on April 15, 2018, in Kyoto, coinciding with the local shrine's 100th anniversary.

== Biography ==
=== Early life ===
Akechi Mitsuhide was believed to be born on 10 March 1528 in Tara Castle, Mino Province (present-day Kani, Gifu Prefecture). In the Akechi Family Tree recorded in "Zoku Gunsho Ruiju" and the "Mino no Kuni Shokki", it is said that the Akechi clan which Mitsuhide hailed from were descended as branch of Toki clan of the Seiwa Genji clan, where the Toki clan served as shugo in Mino Province for over 200 years from the Kenmu Restoration, and has produced several dozen branches from then on. However, there are no primary historical sources that supported this claim. Moreover, when Ashikaga Yoshiaki was staying in Echizen Province, Mitsuhide served as a foot soldier (made up of those who were not direct vassals of the Shogun) recruited during the time of Ashikaga Yoshiteru. This cast doubts among historian he was not from the main line of the Akechi clan of the Toki clan, who were listed in the hokoshu, a higher rank than the foot soldiers. His father is listed as Akechi Mitsutsuna in various genealogies from the Edo period. (Note: Although they are written as Akechi Mitsukuni and Akechi Mitsutaka, there is no one in the main line of the Toki Akechi clan whose name includes the character "光" in the primary historical sources, so it is thought to be fabrication from Edo period regarding Mitsuhide's lineage.) Furthermore, historian Kobayashi Masanobu stated that the name of Mitsusuna, father of Mitsuhide, cannot be found in historical documents of Akechi clan from Toki branch. Thus Tadachika Kuwata suspected that he came from a lower branch of the Akechi clan, not the main branch.

Mitsuhide is rumored to be a childhood friend or cousin of Nōhime. It is believed that he was raised to be a general among 10,000 by Saitō Dōsan and the Toki clan during their governorship of the Mino Province. When Dōsan's son, Saitō Yoshitatsu, rebelled against his father in 1556, Mitsuhide sided with Dōsan.

=== Service under Ashikaga Shogunate ===
Mitsuhide began serving the "wandering shōgun" Ashikaga Yoshiaki as one of his guardians under Hosokawa Fujitaka. Shōgun Ashikaga Yoshiaki asked Asakura Yoshikage to be his official protector, an offer which Yoshikage declined. Later, Yoshiaki appealed to Mitsuhide, who suggested Oda Nobunaga instead.

In 1567, after Nobunaga conquered Mino and Ise Province, Mitsuhide, Nobunaga and also Yoshiaki marched through Omi province to Kyoto.

In November 1568, Nobunaga, Yoshiaki and Mitsuhide arrived in Kyoto, the capital of Japan. Later, Nobunaga made Yoshiaki the next shogun and turned Honkoku-ji Temple into a temporary Shogun palace.

On January 21, 1569, the Miyoshi clan triumvirate (Miyoshi Saninshu) attacked Ashikaga Yoshiaki at Honkoku-ji temple. In this battle, Mitsuhide and Hosokawa Fujitaka defended the shōgun and repulsed the Miyoshi clan. In April, Mitsuhide worked together with Kinoshita Hideyoshi (later changing his surname to Hashiba), Niwa Nagahide, and Nakagawa Shigemasa, as he was tasked as magistrate to manage the government affairs of Kyoto and the surrounding areas under the control of Oda Nobunaga.

On June 1, 1570, at the Siege Kanegasaki in Echizen Province, Mitsuhide led the rearguard of the Oda forces when Nobunaga gave the order to retreat. Later in September, during the conflict between the Oda clan and the forces of Saika Ikki, Mitsuhide was assigned to guard Usayama Castle with 300-400 garrison soldiers under his command.

In 1571, after the successful attack at the Ikkō-ikki Enryaku-ji temple, Mitsuhide received the area of Sakamoto and built Sakamoto Castle. During this battle, about 18 soldiers from Akechi's army were killed. Mitsuhide donated rice offerings to the Saigyo-ji Temple to mourn the fallen. A letter of donation from Mitsuhide remains at the temple, and one of the 18 people mentioned in it was not a samurai but a chūgen (Note: lower rank servant during pre Edo period who were lower in rank than ashigaru infantry. A chūgen is only allowed to carry Wakizashi and not allowed to carry a surname.) In addition, two letters of condolence from Mitsuhide to his vassals who were injured in the battle remain. In July, after Shogun Ashikaga Yoshiaki was defeated in the battle of Makishima Castle, he became exiled, and the Muromachi Shogunate was virtually abolished. Thereby, Many of the former Shogunate vassals, including Ise Sadaoki and other members of the Ise clan, and Suwa Morinao, entered service as vassals of Mitsuhide.

In 1572, Mitsuhide continued serving Shogun Yoshiaki by contributing to the campaign in Kawachi Province under Ashikaga Yoshiteru.

=== Service under Oda Nobunaga ===
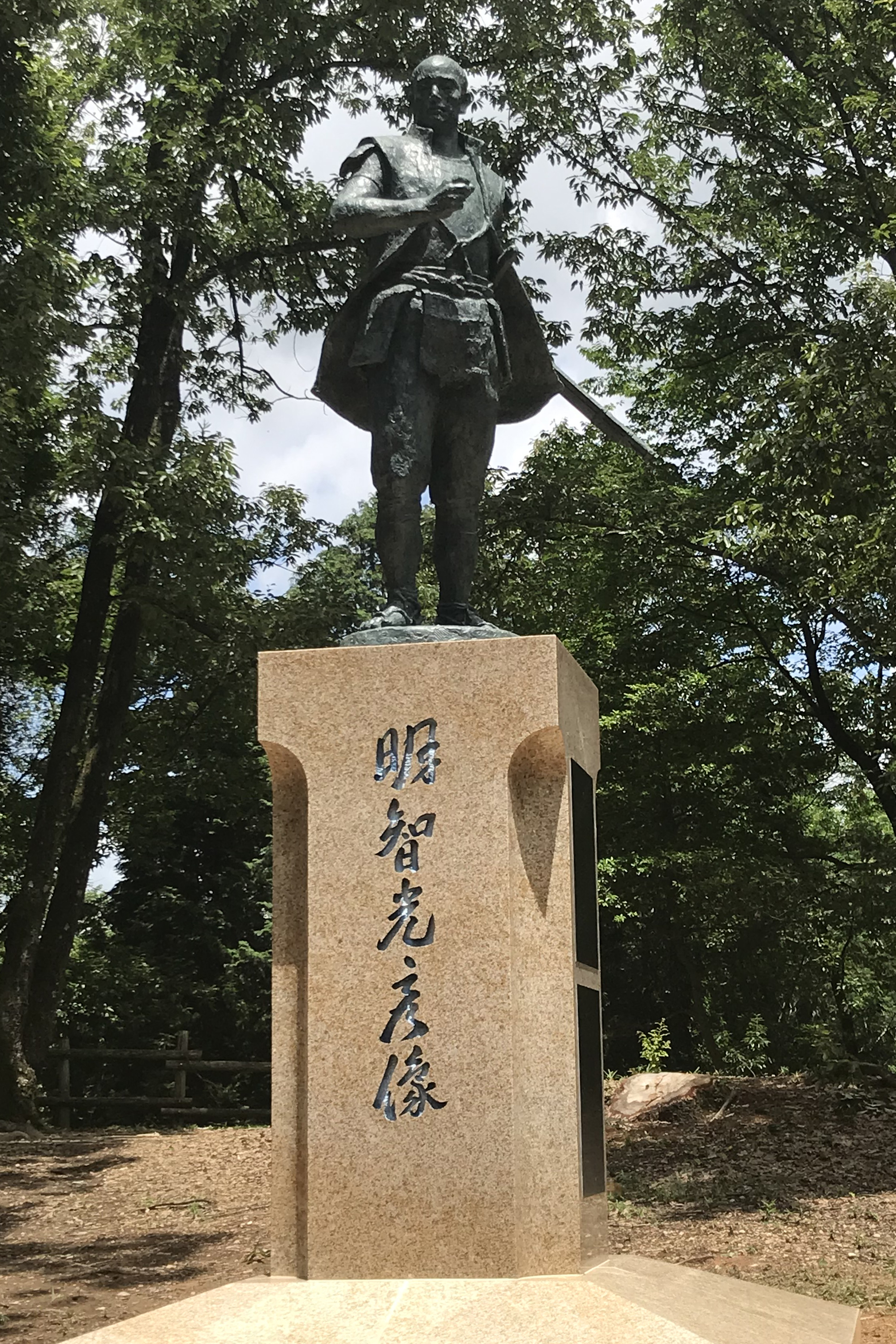
Bronze statue of Akechi Mitsuhide

In 1573, the relationship between Ashikaga Yoshiaki and Nobunaga worsened as Ashikaga raised a coalition against Nobunaga with Takeda Shingen on February. Mitsuhide sided with Nobunaga and participated in the battles of Ishiyama Castle and Imakatata Castle as a direct vassal of Nobunaga. Mitsuhide brought his vassals such as Akechi Yahei, Akechi Jurozaemon, Akechi Jyuemon, Tsumaki Kazue, Miyake Tobei, Fujita Dengo, Matsuda Tarozaemon, and Hida Tatewaki to these battles, killing 58 samurai and over 300 non-samurai infantries of Ashikaga. After the end of the battle, Nobunaga intended to repair his relationship with Ashikaga and opened peace negotiation with him, although it immediately collapsed just before they were concluded due to interference from Matsunaga Hisahide.

In 1574, after the Ashikaga Shogunate ended, Mitsuhide served as a dual magistrate, assessing taxes on temple holdings in Kyōto and its environs.

In 1575, he participated in the Siege of Takaya Castle (高屋城の戦い) against Miyoshi Yasunaga-Ikko Ikki coalition, and then in the Battle of Nagashino against the Takeda clan. After that, Nobunaga sent Akechi Mitsuhide to take control of Tanba Province. Mitsuhide attempted diplomacy and won over a number of the smaller local lords to his side. However, the Akai clan were adamant in their opposition, and Mitsuhide was forced to lay siege to Kuroi Castle for two months in the winter of 1575. According to the "Yoshikawa clan's record", even though many of local lords in Tanba has joined the anti-Nobunaga force, the majority of them keep their loyalty to Nobunaga and supporting Mitsuhide. in this campaign. Later, he was awarded the Court titles of "Junior Fifth Rank (Lower)" and "Governor of Hyūga", and the honorary title of "Koretō Hyūga-no-kami". In June, Nobunaga ordered him to pacify Tanba Province and Tango Province. During this campaign in Tanba Province, Mitsuhide cooperated with local lords such as Obata Nagaaki from Funai County. In addition, Kawakatsu Tsuguhisa from Imamiya, Kuwata County, had also switched sides to the Oda side after being persuaded by Obata. On July, Mitsuhide began attacking pro-Yoshiaki local lords of Tanba such as Utsuno Yorishige with the help of Obata and Kawakatsu. However, at the same time he was also ordered by Nobunaga to send reinforcements to Echizen and Tango, and left the area. On August, Utsuno Yorishige attacked the Oda clan's Umaji Castle and Amarube Castle. The reason behind this order was said to be a checkmate against Akai Naomasa of Hikami County, who was pursuing attacks on Izushi Castle and Takeda Castle in Tajima, which were the territory of the Yamana clan, while showing an ambiguous attitude toward Nobunaga's attack on Tanba. Later, Mitsuhide returned to Sakamoto Castle, and on October began a new attack on Tanba. Utsu Yorishige fled without fighting, and Mitsuhide then besieged Kuroi Castle, where Akai Naomasa had returned after giving up on the attack on Takeda Castle. Later, Mitsuhide built fortifications on at least three separate places in his effort to besiege and capture Kuroi Castle.

In January 1576, Akai Naomasa suddenly attacked Mitsuhide, where they engaged in the battle of Kuroi Castle, forcing Mitsuhide to retreat his forces. In April, Naomasa and his relative, Akai Tadai, submitted once again to Nobunaga, as they feared the reprisal from the Oda clan, albeit it was argued that it was Mitsuhide's role to negotiate and convince them to do so. Later in the same month, during the Ishiyama Hongan-ji War, Mitsuhide, Hosokawa Fujitaka, Harada Naomasa, and Araki Murashige led the Oda forces against the Ikkō-ikki in the battle of Tenno-ji. On May 5, Mitsuhide involved in a battle where one of his general, Hanawa Naomasa, was killed in battle. Mitsuhide were cornered by the Ikkō rebel forces at Tenno-ji Fort, until he relieved by Nobunaga's aid. On May 23, Mitsuhide fell ill due to overwork and had to recuperate for a while. Meanwhile, in Tanba Province, the Hatano clan under Hatano Hideharu, the lord of Yakami Castle, declared independence and rebelled against Nobunaga. Hideharu sudden insurrection caught Mitsuhide in surprise and defeated his forces. During this battle, Hyōdayū Horibe, who acted as Mitsuhide's Kagemusha (replacement), was killed.

In 1577, Mitsuhide, along with Hosokawa Fujitaka and Tsutsui Junkei, fought under Oda Nobutada in the Siege of Shigisan against Matsunaga Hisahide, who had rebelled against Nobunaga. Later, Mitsuhide took part in the Battle of Tedorigawa against Uesugi Kenshin.

In 1578, two years after the Hatano clan rebelled, Nobunaga ordered Mitsuhide to return to Tanba Province and subdue them. Mitsuhide defeated several rebel clans allied to the Hatano. He defeated the Akai clan, led by Akai Naomasa, at the second siege of Kuroi castle. On March, after Naomasa died of an illness, Mitsuhide brought his forces to attack Sonobe Castle and forced the defender, Araki Ujitsuna, to surrender. For this successful campaign, Nobunaga awarded Mitsuhide Kameyama Castle, and Tanba Province as a fief with revenue of 550,000 koku. On June 4, Mitsuhide was sent to Harima Province as reinforcements for Hideyoshi, who was attacking the Mōri clan, where he participated in the siege of Kamiyoshi Castle. However, in September, a huge uprising broke out in Tanba Province, and even Umahori Castle, which was a key location for the defense of Kameyama Castle, was temporarily occupied by the rebels. Mitsuhide returned to Tanba in response and recapture the castle. Later, Mitsuhide besiege Yakami Castle which held by Hatano Hideharu. However, as Yakami Castle was a mountain castle which very difficult to capture. Mitsuhide then decided to a strategy of besieging Yakami Castle commence separate operations to subdue another subsidiary fortresses belongs to Hideharu one by one to isolate Yakami castle. Mitsuhide first dug a moat around Yakami Castle, built earthworks, and then built walls and fences on top of it. By completely surrounding Yakami Castle, he prevented military supplies and ammunition from being brought into the castle. After completely surrounding Yakami Castle in this way, started to capture the other fortresses.

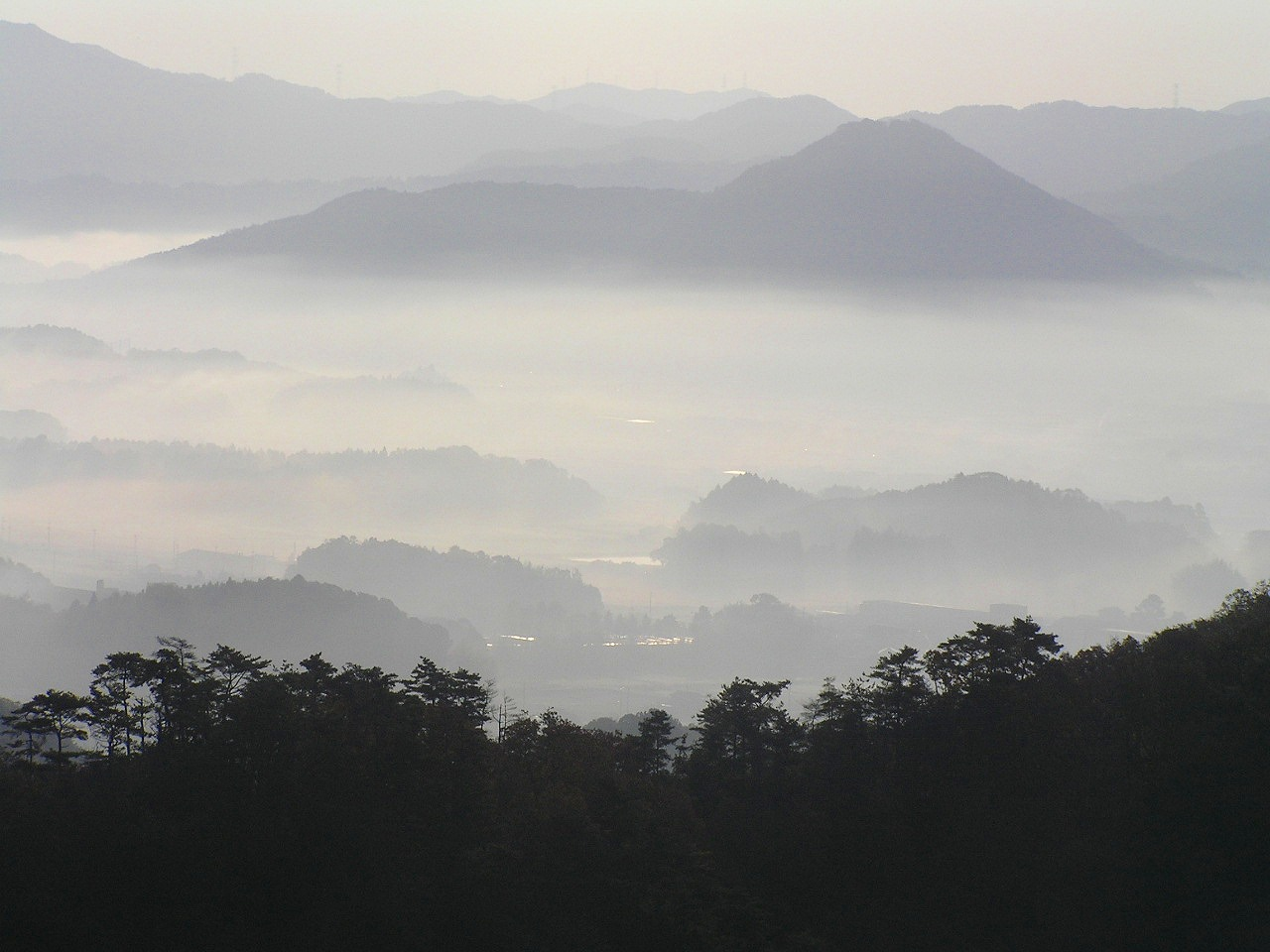
Location of the mountain where the Yakami Castle was located

In 1579, the conflict of the Oda clan against Hatano Hideharu in Tanba province reached its final stage. However in January, Hatano's forces counterattacked and Obata Nagaakira, one of the few Tanba locals who had consistently supported the Oda clan, was killed. Mitsuhide gave Nagaakira's surviving child the surname Akechi, and although he allowed the Obata clan to appoint a temporary representative, he ordered that Nagaakira's son must become the head of the family after he reached adulthood. Later, Mitsuhide stormed and captured Kuroi Castle, causing Akai Naoyoshi, who was 9 years old at the time, fled the castle. (Note: Following this, Mitsuhide induced Hatano Hideharu to surrender Yakami Castle by promising Hideharu safety. However, Nobunaga broke the agreement and executed Hideharu. This reputedly displeased the Hatano family. As a result, several of Hideharu's retainers murdered Akechi Mitsuhide's mother (or aunt). However, this theory of Stephen Turnbull was disputed by various Japanese historians such as Watanabe Daimon, and many others, as the source of this theory are deemed unreliable.) After Tanba was pacified, Mitsuhide distribute a fief of 10,000 koku to Saitō Toshimitsu and appoint him as the lord of Kuroi Castle, and governance of Hikami district.

In 1580, Nobunaga dismissed his most important commander, Sakuma Nobumori. Mitsuhide replaced Nobumori in command and came to lead the largest force in the Kinki area (Kansai). This move was often said to be linked to the Honnō-ji Incident.

In 1581, Nobunaga assigned Mitsuhide to manage the Kyōto ouma-zoroi ("Kyōto Mounted Horse Parade"), a large-scale military parade held to the east of the Imperial Palace in Kyōto.

=== Honnō-ji Incident ===
In 1582, Mitsuhide was ordered by Nobunaga to march west to assist Hashiba Hideyoshi who was at that time fighting the Mōri clan. Ignoring his orders, Mitsuhide assembled an army of 13,000 soldiers and moved against Nobunaga's position at Honnō-ji. On June 21, Mitsuhide was quoted as saying, "The enemy is at Honnō-ji!" His army surrounded the temple and eventually set it on fire. Oda Nobunaga was killed either during the fighting, or by his own hand. Nobunaga's son, Oda Nobutada, fled the scene, but was surrounded at Nijō Shin Gosho, a fortified imperial villa near today's Nijō Castle, and killed. Despite not killing Nobunaga personally, Mitsuhide claimed responsibility for his death. Neither Nobunaga's nor Nobutada's bodies were ever found.

Mitsuhide's betrayal of Nobunaga shocked the capital, and he was forced to move quickly to secure his position. Mitsuhide looted Azuchi castle to reward his men and maintain their loyalty. Mitsuhide attempted to make gestures of friendship to a panicked Imperial Court; he also made many attempts to win over the other clans, but to no avail.

Meanwhile, Hosokawa Fujitaka, to whom he was related through marriage, quickly cut ties with him, and Tsutsui Junkei refused to side with him and half-heartedly supported Hideyoshi. Tetsuo Owada argues that Mitsuhide was hindered in his efforts to consolidate power by his inability to recover the heads of Nobunaga and Nobutada following the attacks, which caused many daimyō lords to doubt his success, while Hideyoshi managed to spin propaganda that Nobunaga was still alive and had escaped the assassination attempt. This undermined Mitsuhide's reputation, and most of Nobunaga's vassals and allies waited for his return instead of accepting Mitsuhide's invitation to join him.

=== Death ===
Akechi Mitsuhide grave information plaque at Umemiyacho, Kyoto.

Mitsuhide had counted on Toyotomi Hideyoshi being occupied fighting with the Mori, and unable to respond to Mitsuhide's coup d'état. However, having learned of the assassination of his lord, Hideyoshi quickly signed a peace treaty with the Mori, and alongside Tokugawa Ieyasu rushed to be the first to avenge Nobunaga. Hideyoshi force marched his army to Settsu in four days, and caught Mitsuhide off guard.

Mitsuhide had been unable to garner support for his cause, and his army had dwindled down to 10,000 men. Hideyoshi, however, had won over former Oda retainers, including Niwa Nagahide and Ikeda Tsuneoki, and had a strength of 20,000 men. On July 2, 1582, the two forces met at the Battle of Yamazaki.

Mitsuhide took up a position south of Shōryūji Castle, securing his right flank by the Yodo river, and his left at the foot of the 270-metre Tennozan. Hideyoshi immediately seized the advantage by securing the heights of Tennōzan; his vanguard then maneuvered to face the Akechi forces along the Enmyōji river.

Mitsuhide's forces made a failed attempt to force Hideyoshi from Tennōzan. Ikeda Tsuneoki moved to reinforce Hideyoshi's right flank, which soon crossed Enmyōji-gawa and turned the Akechi flank. Simultaneously, Hideyoshi's forces marched against the Akechi front; this started a rout, only two hours after the battle had begun.

Mitsuhide's men fled, with the exception of the 200 men under Mimaki Kaneaki (御牧 兼顕), who charged and were destroyed by Hideyoshi's larger force. Soon, panic set in among the Akechi army, and Hideyoshi's army chased them back to Shōryūji, where the garrison collapsed. The bandit leader Nakamura Chōbei later killed Mitsuhide as he fled the battle.

Mitsuhide had "ruled" Japan for 13 days.

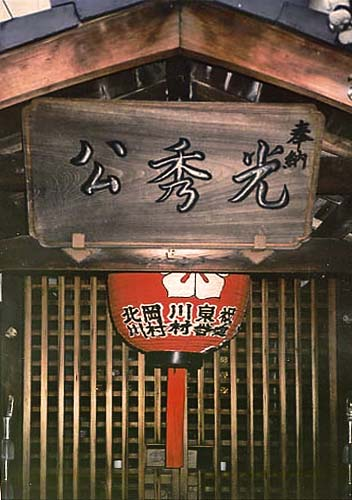
Shrine to Akechi Mitsuhide, Kyoto

== Family ==
- Father: Akechi Mitsutsuna
- Mother: Daughter of the Wakasa Takeda clan
- Wife: Tsumaki Hiroko (妻木煕子)
- Sons:
  - Akechi Mitsuyoshi (明智光慶)
- Daughters:
  - Hosokawa Gracia (明智玉子): Wife of Hosokawa Tadaoki; ancestor of Empress Shōken
- Relatives
  - Akechi Hidemitsu (明智秀満): cousin; adopted son (also son-in-law); ancestor of Sakamoto Ryōma
  - Nōhime: Cousin; Saitō Dōsan daughter; Wife of Oda Nobunaga

== Anecdotes ==
There is a strange story passed down in Yamagata (city) that Mitsuhide survived the Battle of Yamasaki and participated in the Battle of Sekigahara. According to this legend, Mitsuhide managed to escape his enemies by the help of a person named Araki Yamashiro-no-Kami Yukinobu. This person agreed to impersonate Mitsuhide as his Kagemusha, so the enemy killed Araki instead of Mitsuhide. Afterwards, Mitsuhide arrived at Saito-ji Temple in Yamagata City and attempted to make a comeback. In gratitude to Yukinobu who died in his place, Mitsuhide took the "ara" character from Yukinobu's surname and changed his name to "Arafuka Kogoro". When the Battle of Sekigahara broke out in September 1600, Mitsuhide marched out to join forces with Tokugawa Ieyasu on the Eastern side. Unfortunately, he was caught in a flood at Yabukawa River in Neo Village (Motosu City, Gifu Prefecture) and drowned along with his horse. Historian Watanabe Daimon said there is no historical evidence to verify this theory. But there are many people with the surname Arafuka living nearby Yamagata in the 21st century who claimed to be Mitsuhide's descendants.

It was said that after Mitsuhide's death, no one wanted to inherit his court title Koretō Hyūga no Kami (惟任日向守) as there was superstition that the title bore misfortune. It was vacanted until Mizuno Katsushige was willing to take the title, as he did not bother with Mitsuhide's bad reputation as traitor and the superstitious belief about the title. Since then, Katsushige gained the nickname Hyūga Demon (鬼日向).

== Legacy ==
=== Tensho Koshirae sword ===
The Tensho Koshirae was first forged during the Azuchi-Momoyama Era and was meant to be a replica of Akechi Mitsuhide's sword. These katanas were made for practical use and thus had a simplistic design philosophy and the metal tempered to be strong and durable. The Akechi family was able to trace their heritage to the Toki clan and from there to the Minamoto clan.

=== Castles built or reconstructed by Mitsuhide ===
Mitsuhide was well known as a master of castle construction, and was engaged in the construction of many castles.

- Sakamoto Castle, main base of Akechi clan and also Mitsuhide's residence
- Fukuchiyama Castle
- Kameyama Castle, an Akechi Mistuhide's statue was built in the castle in 2019
- Shūzan Castle
- Kinzan Castle
- Kuroi Castle
- Shūchi Castle
- Usayama Castle

== Appendix ==
=== Bibliography ===
- Fujimoto, Masayuki (2010). 本能寺の変〜信長の油断・光秀の殺意〜 [The Honnoji Incident – Nobunaga's Carelessness and Mitsuhide's Murderous Intent]. 歴史新書y 9. 洋泉社. ISBN 978-4862486387.
- Fukushima, Katsuhiko (2020). 明智光秀. 中公新書. 中央公論新社. ISBN 978-4-12-102622-4.
- Hayashima, Daisuke (2016). "明智光秀の居所と行動". In Fujii Jōji (ed.). 織豊期主要人物居所集成 第2版 [Collection of Residences of Major Figures in the Azuchi-Momoyama Period] (2nd ed.). 思文閣出版. ISBN 978-4784218332.
- Kaneko, Hiraku (2019). 信長家臣明智光秀. 平凡社新書 (in Japanese). 平凡社. ISBN 978-4-582-85923-2.
- Kirino, Sakujin (2020). 明智光秀と斎藤利三－本能寺の変の鍵を握る二人の武将― [Akechi Mitsuhide and Saito Toshimitsu - Two warlords who hold the key to the Honnoji Incident]. 宝島社.
- Kobayashi, Masanobu (2019). 明智光秀の乱 ―天正十年六月政変 織田政権の成立と崩壊 [The Rebellion of Akechi Mitsuhide: The Coup of June 1581, the Rise and Fall of the Oda Government] (新装改訂増補 ed.). 里文出版.
- Kuwata, Tadachika (1983). 明智光秀 [Akechi Mitsuhide]. 講談社文庫. 講談社.
- Niki, Hiroshi (2019). "明智光秀の丹波統一". 明智光秀 [Tamba Unification]. シリーズ・織豊大名の研究 第八巻. 戎光祥出版. ISBN 9784864033213.(First published in the New Kameoka City History, Main Text Volume 2, Chapter 3, Section 1, 2004)
- Otsuki Masayuki; Shiba Hiroyuki (2019). "明智光秀の丹波平定". 明智光秀 [Mitsuhide Akechi]. シリーズ・織豊大名の研究 第八巻. 戎光祥出版. ISBN 9784864033213. (First published in the Fukuchiyama City History, Volume 2, Early Modern Period, Chapter 1, Section 2, 1982)
- Shiba Hiroyuki 1 (2019). "惟任(明智)光秀論". 明智光秀. シリーズ・織豊大名の研究 第八巻. 戎光祥出版. ISBN 9784864033213.
- Takahashi, Shigekazu (2020). 明智光秀を破った「丹波の赤鬼」―荻野直正と城郭― (in Japanese). 神戸新聞総合出版センター. ISBN 978-4-343-01061-2.
- Takayanagi, Mitsuhide (1958). 明智光秀. 人物叢書1. 吉川弘文館.
- Takayanagi, Mitsutoshi (1966), Akechi Mitsuhide (in Japanese), Tōkyō: Yoshikawa Kōbunkan, OCLC 42626467
- Taniguchi, Katsuhiro (2005). 信長軍の司令官―部将たちの出世競争 [Commander of Nobunaga's Army: The Rivalry for Success among Generals]. 中公新書. 中央公論新社. ISBN 4-12-101782-X.
- Taniguchi, Katsuhiro (2010). 織田信長家臣人名辞典 第2版 (in Japanese). 吉川弘文館. ISBN 978-4-642-01457-1.
- Taniguchi, Kengo (1994). 流浪の戦国貴族 近衛前久. 中公新書 (in Japanese). 中央公論新社. ISBN 978-4-12-101213-5.
- Taniguchi, Kengo (2014). 明智光秀. 歴史新書y. 洋泉社. ISBN 978-4800304216.
- Owada, Tetsuo (1998). 明智光秀 つくられた「謀反人」. PHP新書. PHP研究所. ISBN 978-4-56-960109-0.
