= Yakami Castle =

- 八上城
- Tamba-Sasayama, Hyōgo Prefecture, Japan
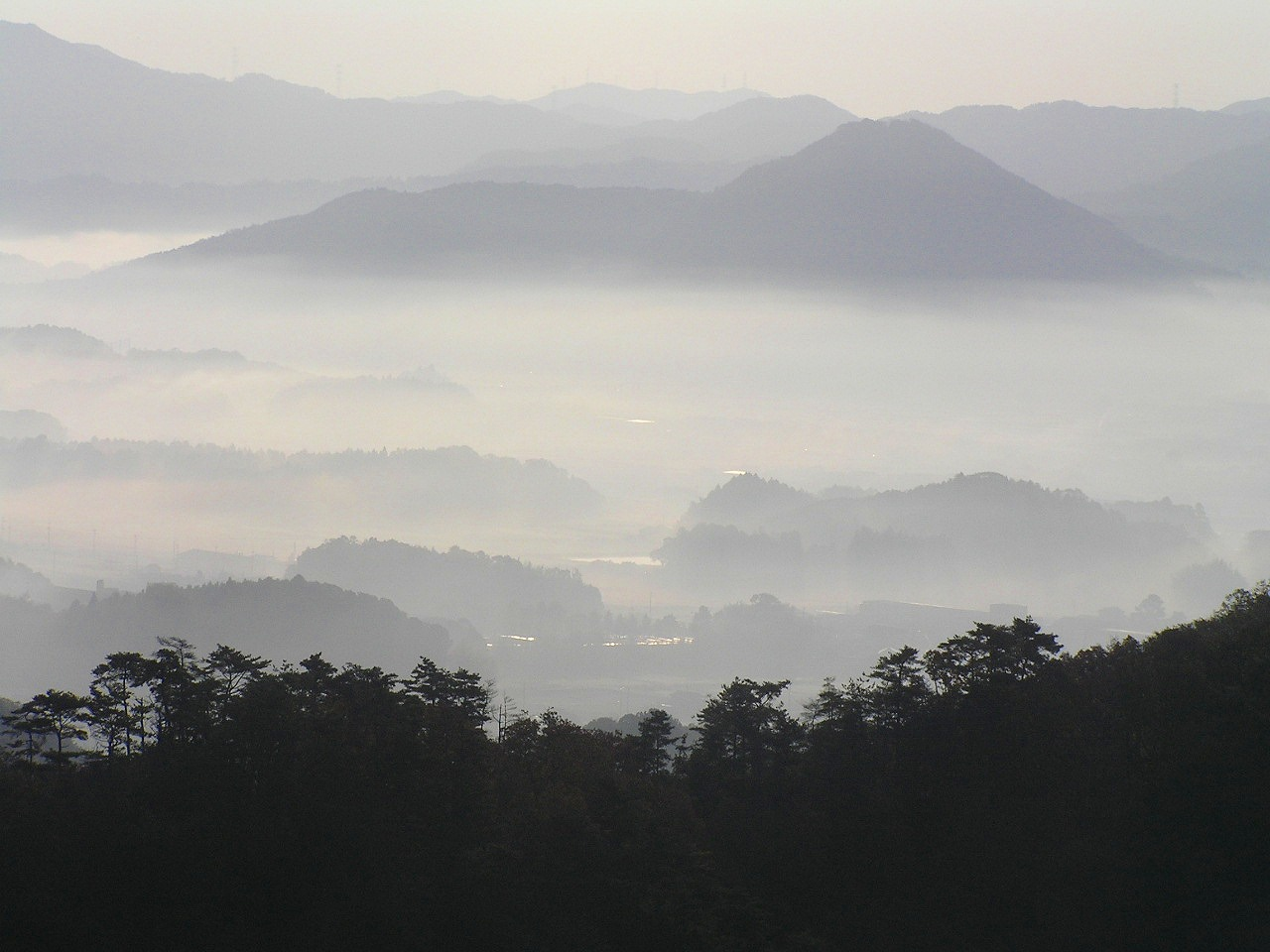
- Yakami Castle(Mt.Takashiro)

Site information
- Type: Mountaintop style castle
- Controlled by: Hatano clan, Akechi clan
- Condition: ruins

Location
- Yakami Castle Yakami Castle (Japan)
- Coordinates: 35°3′42.41″N 135°15′20.58″E

Site history
- Built: 1508
- Built by: Hatano Motokiyo
- Materials: Stone walls, Eathworks
- Demolished: 1609
- Events: Siege of Yakami Castle 1~7

Garrison information
- Past commanders: Hatano Hideharu, Akechi Mitsutada, Toyotomi Hidekatsu, Maeda Geni
- National Historic Site of Japan

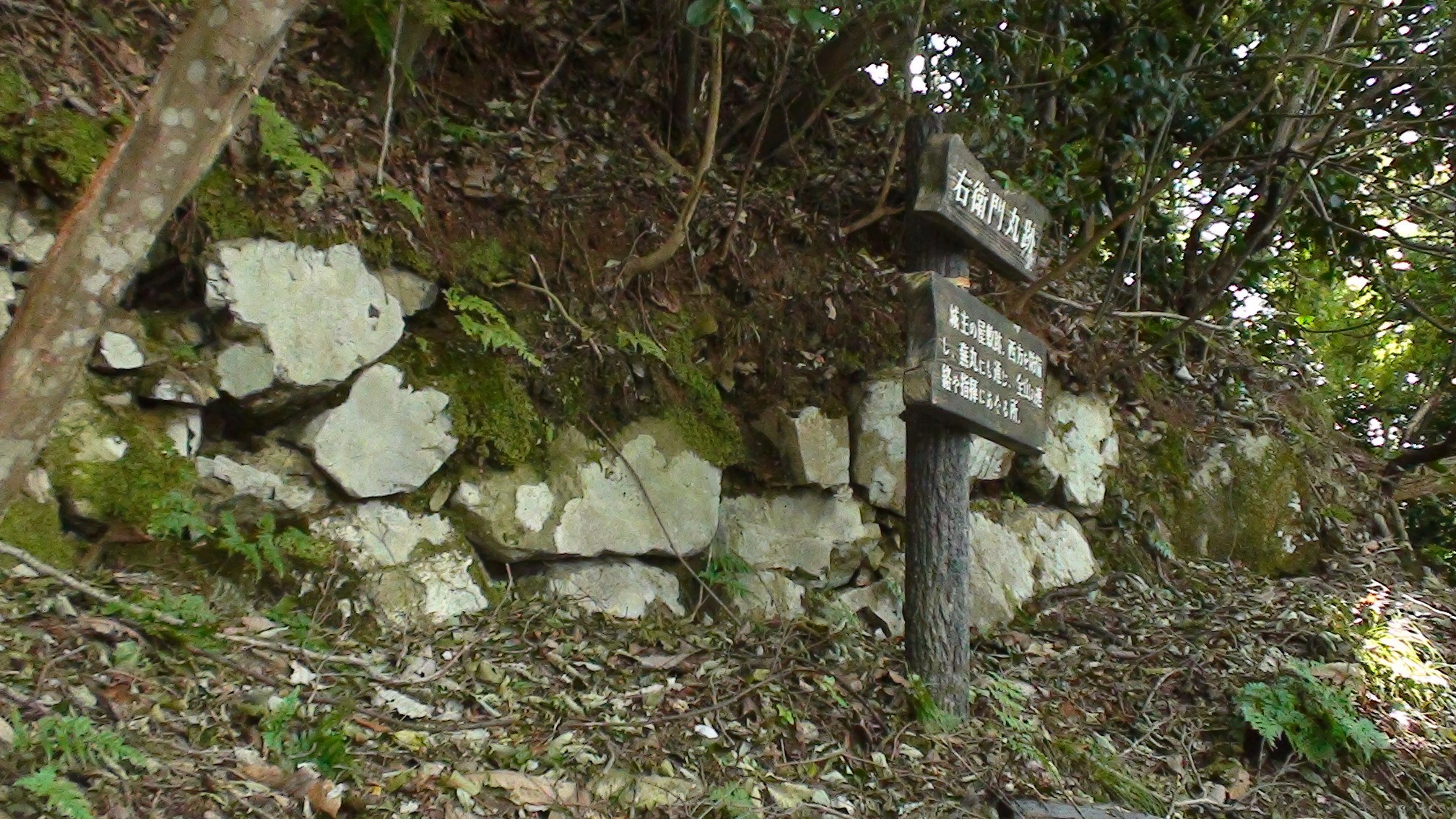
Stone wall of Sanmaru Base

Yakami Castle (八上城, Yakami-jō) was a Sengoku period Japanese castle located in what is now part of the city of Tamba-Sasayama Hyōgo Prefecture, Japan. Its ruins have been protected as a National Historic Site since 2005. The castle was one of the largest in Tanba Province, along with Kuroi Castle and Yagi Castle. It was the original base of power for the Hatano clan.

== History ==
Yagami Castle is located on 400-meter Most Tashiroyama to the southeast of the modern city center of Tamba-Sasayama in former Tanba Province. Tanba is very mountainous, but due to its proximity to the capital at Kyoto, it was regarded as having high strategic values. Settlement was mostly in four mountain basis, Hikami and Sasayama in what is now Hyōgo and Fukuchiyama and Kameoka in what is now Kyoto Prefecture. During the Muromachi period, the shugo of the province was the Hosokawa clan, who ruled through their deputy, the Naito clan. However, following the Onin War, the Hosokawa clan was greatly weakened and divided by internal conflicts, and many small local chieftains seized power over areas of the province. One of these was the Hatano clan, whose chieftain, Hatano Tanemichi was a talented general who seized the Sasayama basin from the Naito clan and built Yagami Castle as his stronghold in 1508.

His son Hatano Harumichi lost Yagami castle to Matsunaga Hisahide in 1557, but Harumichi’s son Hatano Hideharu, recovered it in 1566, with the support of Akai Naomasa, the "Red Demon of Tanba" of Kuroi Castle in neighboring Hikami basin. The Hatano clan gradually expanded Yagami castle into a large fortress. The castle itself consisted of ten connected enclosures spread northeast and northwest on 200 meters of ridges at the mid-way point on the slopes of the mountain. Only the central area was protected by stone walls. In the surrounding hills were numerous outlying fortifications to protect the approaches to the main castle.

In 1568, Oda Nobunaga entered Kyoto, but was unable to immediately turn his attention to further conquests to the west due to war with the Takeda clan of Kai Province. Many of the lords of Tanba, including the Hatano, pledged fealty to Nobunaga, but the Akai clan was an exception. During this period, Akai Naomasa greatly expanded his power, aggressively counterattacking against the Yamana clan in Tajima Province. As the Yamana were Nobunaga's vassals, in 1575 Nobunaga sent Akechi Mitsuhide to conquer Tanba and destroy the Akai. Mitsuhide was quickly able to lay siege to Kuroi Castle, but he was betrayed by Hatano Hideharu from behind and was forced to flee the province in early 1576. Mitsuhide raised a new army and invaded Tanba again in 1578. This time, he methodically constructed fortifications along the way to protect his supply lines and to guard against a repeat of his disastrous first campaign. Both Kuroi Castle and Yakami Castle were placed under siege. In June 1579, after a one year encirclement and over ten assaults, Yakami Castle surrendered. Hatano Hideharu and his two brothers were sent as prisoners to Nobunaga, who had them executed. It is often claimed that Akechi Mitsuhide sent his aged mother to Yakami Castle as a hostage to reassure the Hatano that their lives would be spared if they surrendered, and that she was executed when Nobunaga went back on his word and killed them instead. It is further said that this was a contributing cause to the Honnō-ji incident of 1582 in which Akechi Mitsuhide assassinated Nobunaga; however, there are no historical records to support these claims.

Akechi Mitsutada (1540-1582), a relative of Mitsuhide was placed as a castellan of Yagami Castle. After Toyotomi Hideyoshi defeated Mitsuhide at the Battle of Yamazaki, he replaced Akechi Mitsutada with Toyotomi Hidekatsu, and after Hidekatsu's death, it was controlled by Maeda Gen'i. After the Battle of Sekigahara, despite being on the losing Western side, the Tokugawa Shogunate confirmed Maeda Gen'i at Yakami Castle. He was succeeded by Maeda Shigekatsu, who was granted a 50,000 koku domain in 1602. A fervent Kirishitan, he was accused of misgovernment and many of his officials committed seppuku. In 1608, he was declared insane by the shogunate and removed from office. The castle was given to Matsudaira Yasushige, who may have been Tokugawa Ieyasu's illegitimate son. A new castle, Sasayama Castle was constructed three kilometers to the north, and after Matsudaira Yasushige relocated his seat there in late 1608, Yakami Castle was abandoned.

At present, only some remnants of stone walls and the rough outlines of the enclosures on the mountainside remain.

== Gallery ==
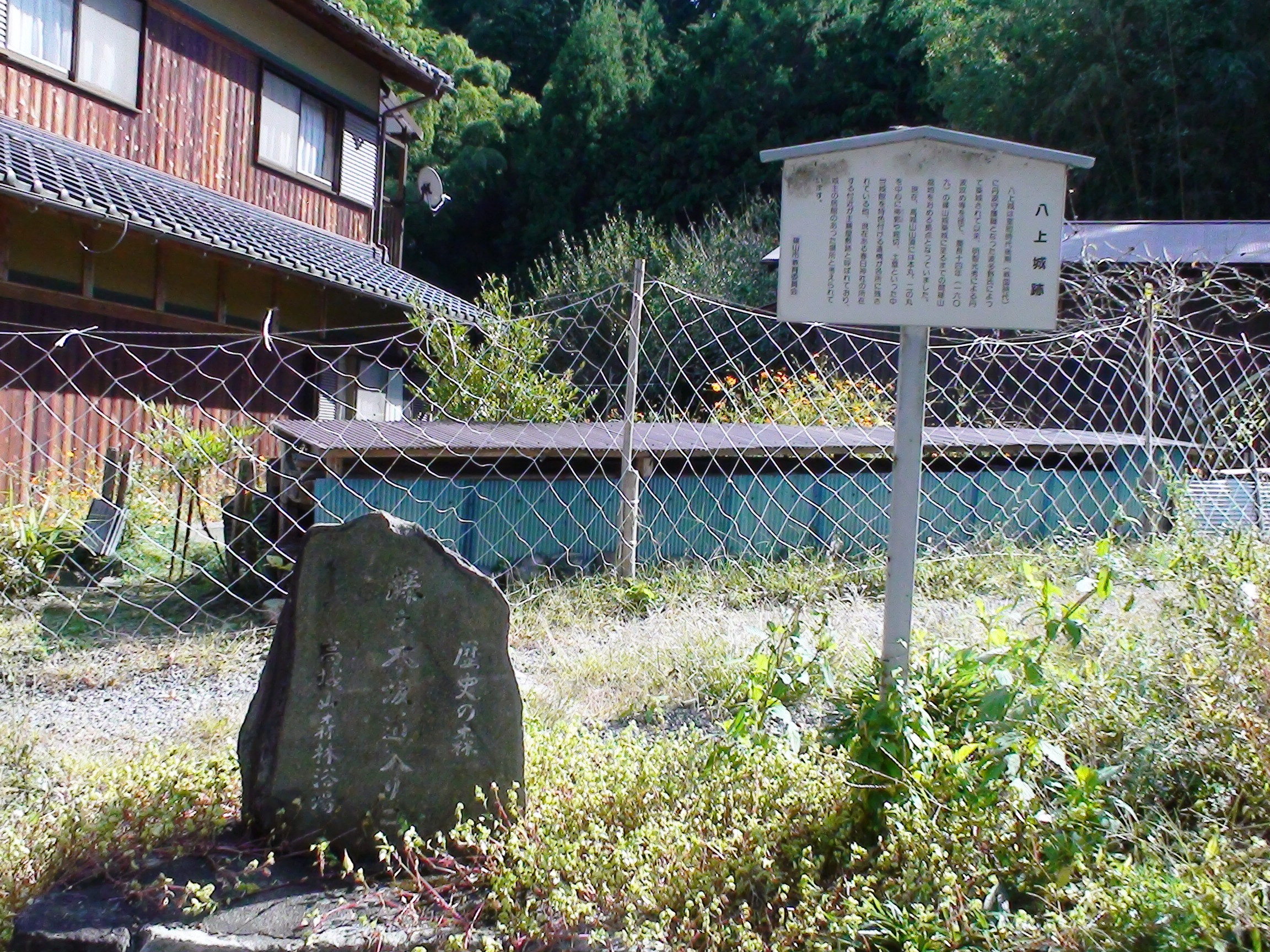
Entrance to climbing path to Yagami Castle

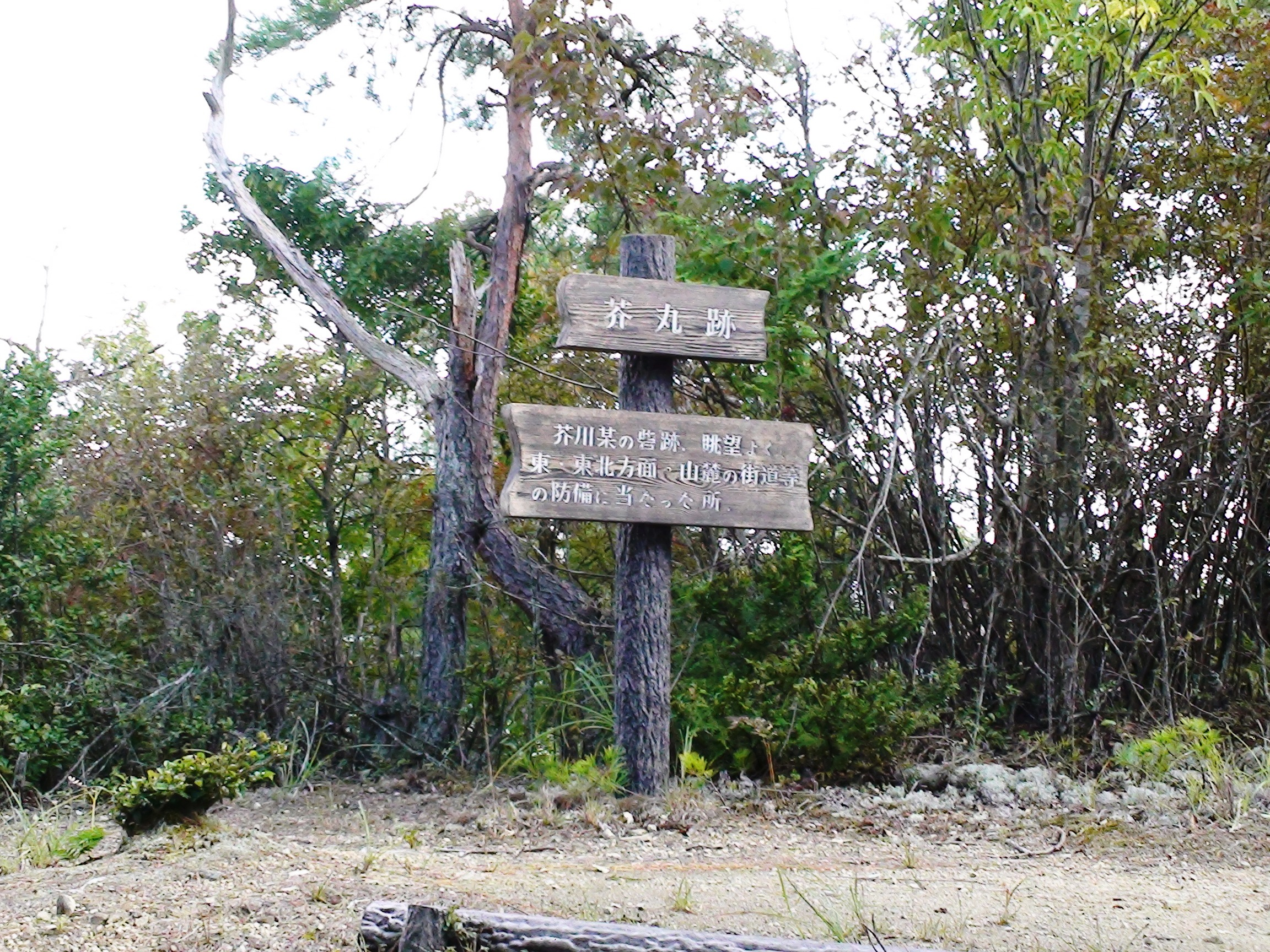
Akuta-maru ruins

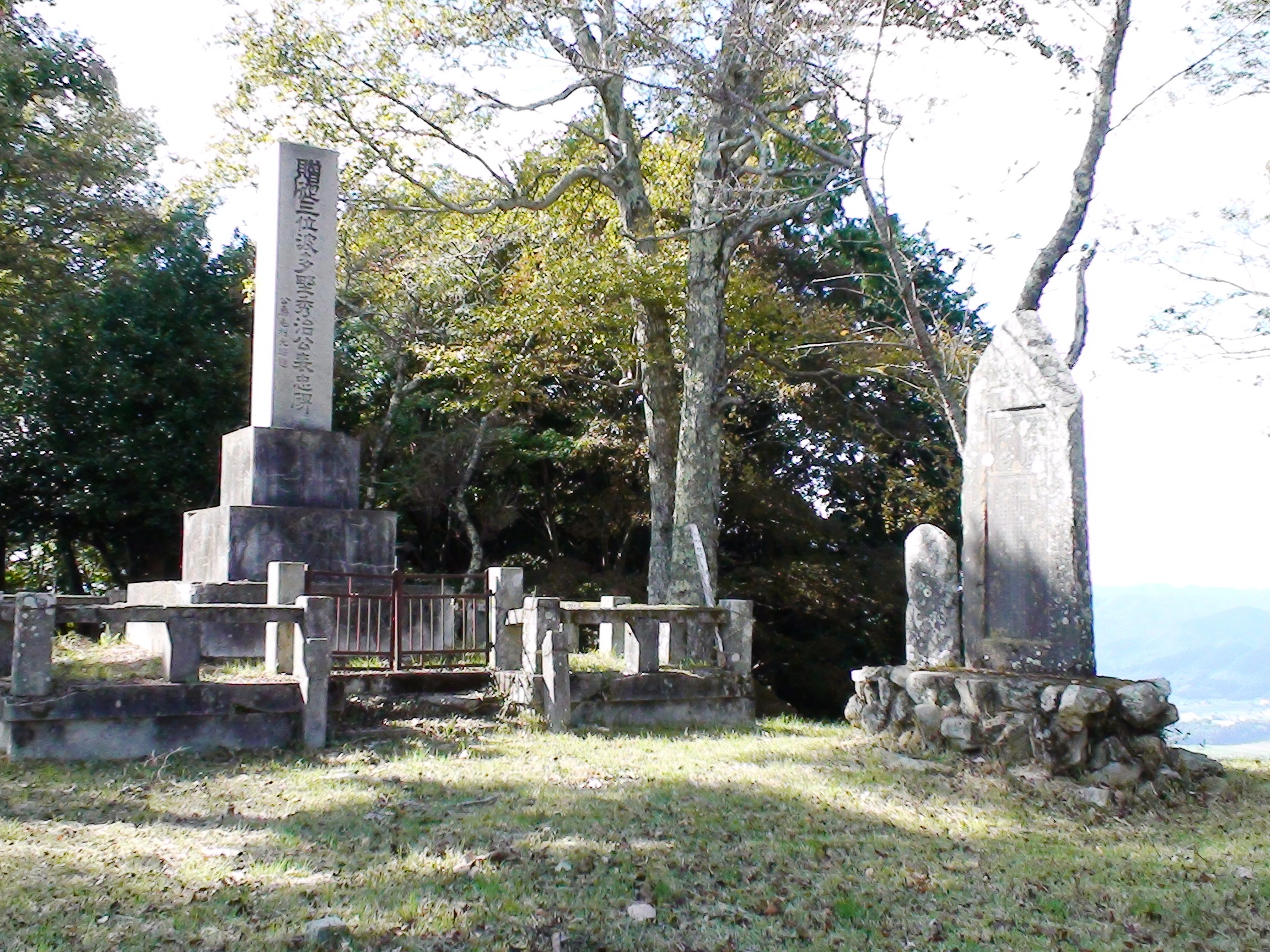
portion of the Honmaru

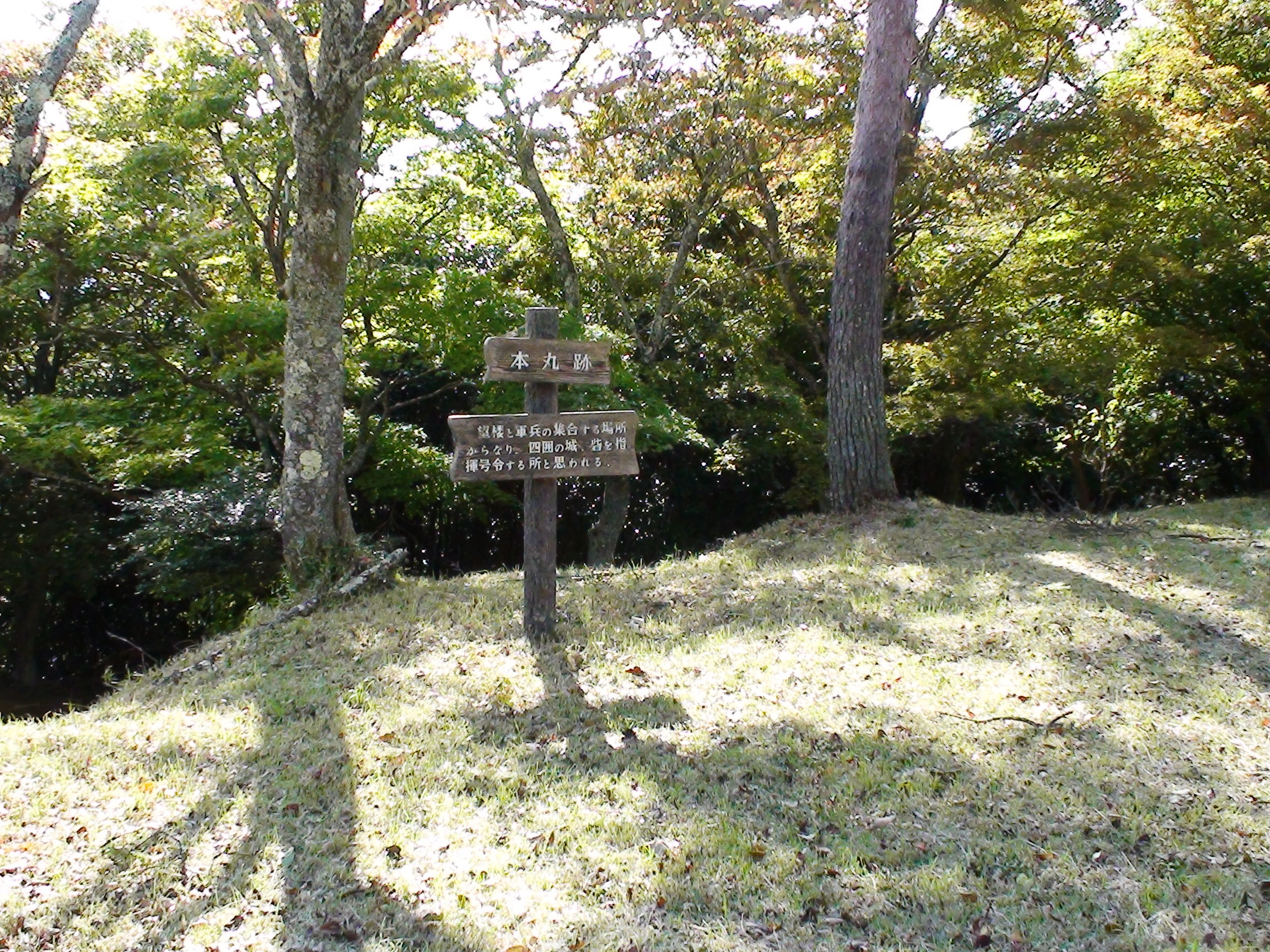
ruins of the Honmaru

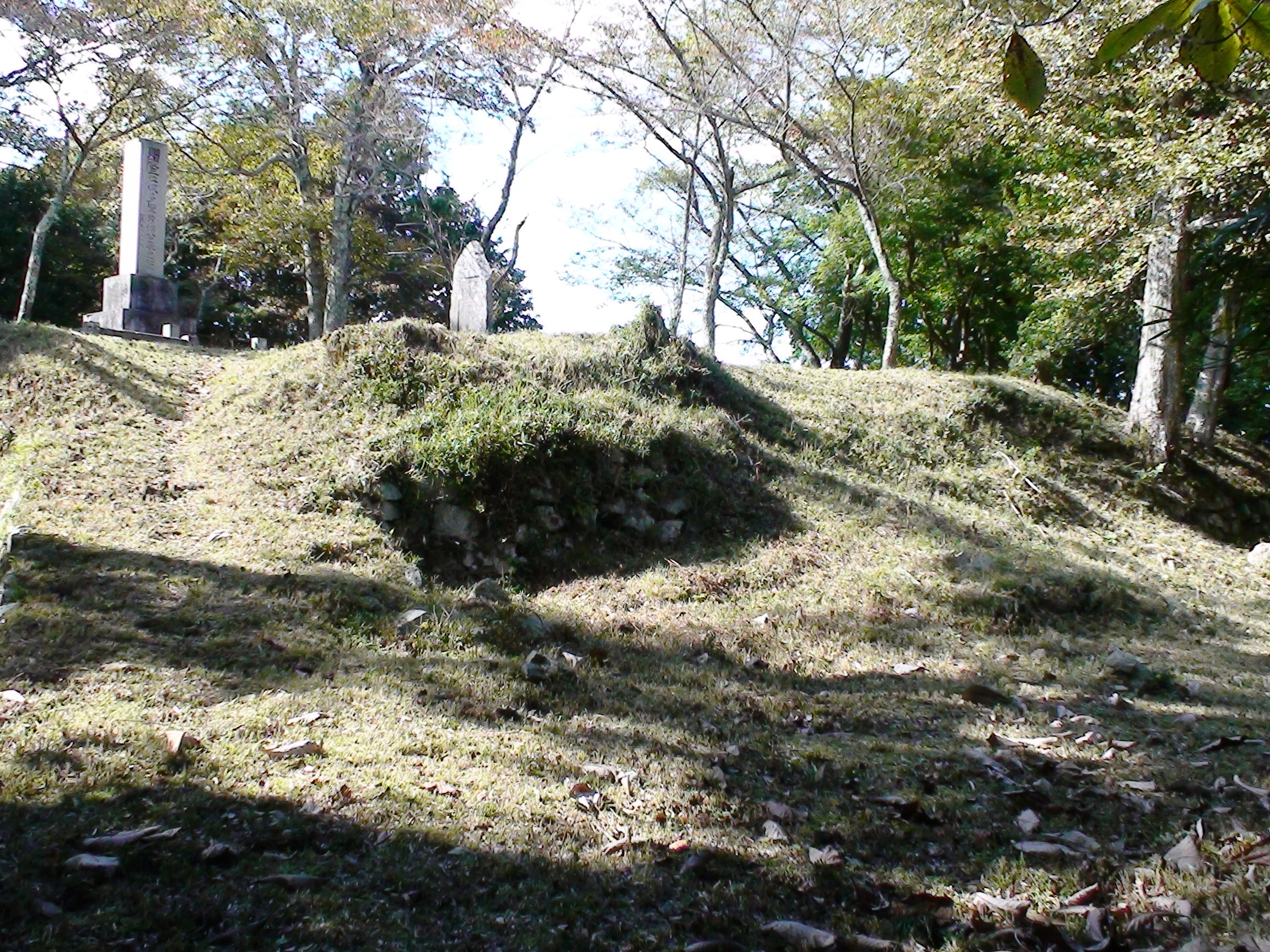
portion of the Honmaru

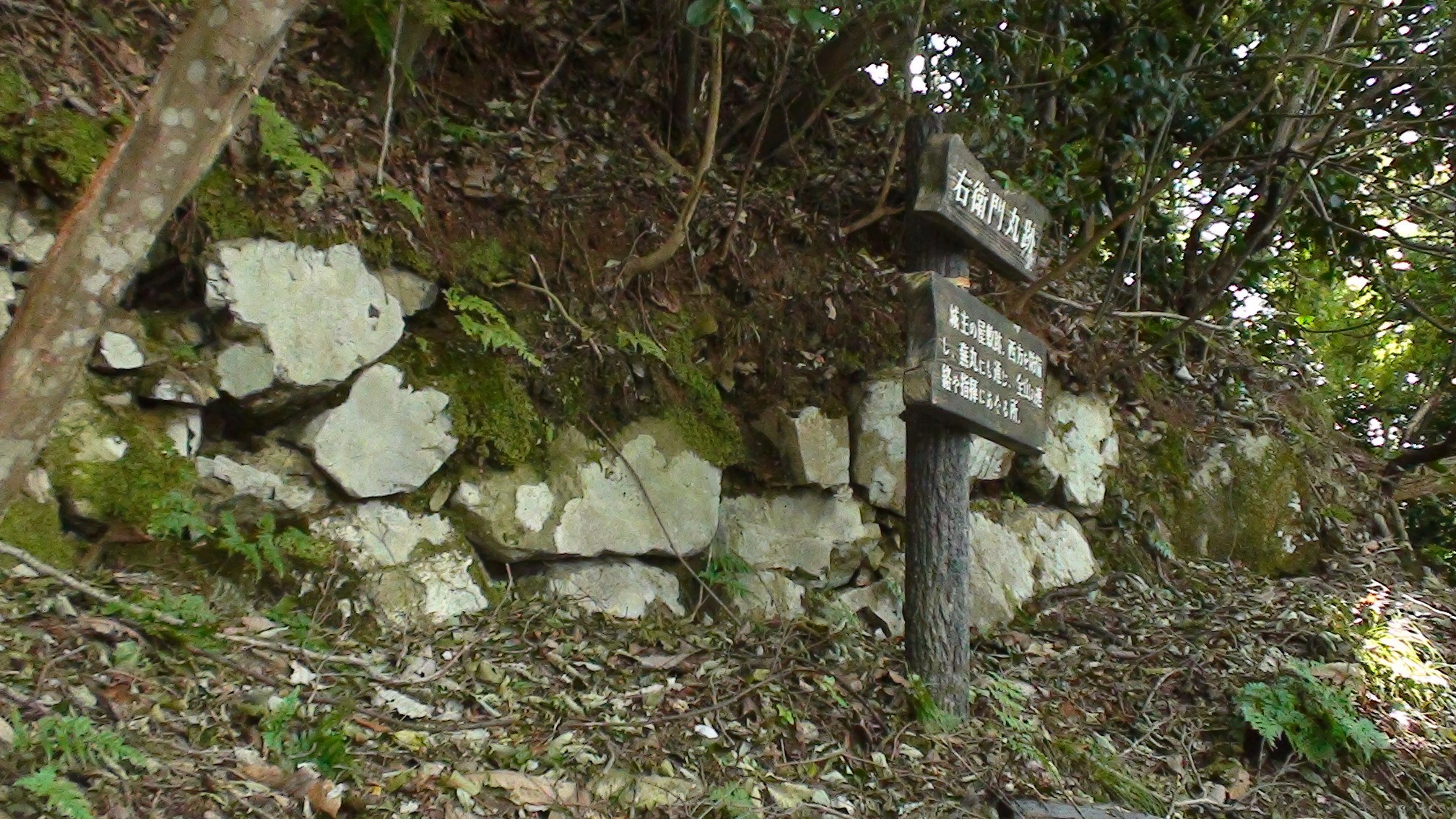
portion of the San-no-maru walls

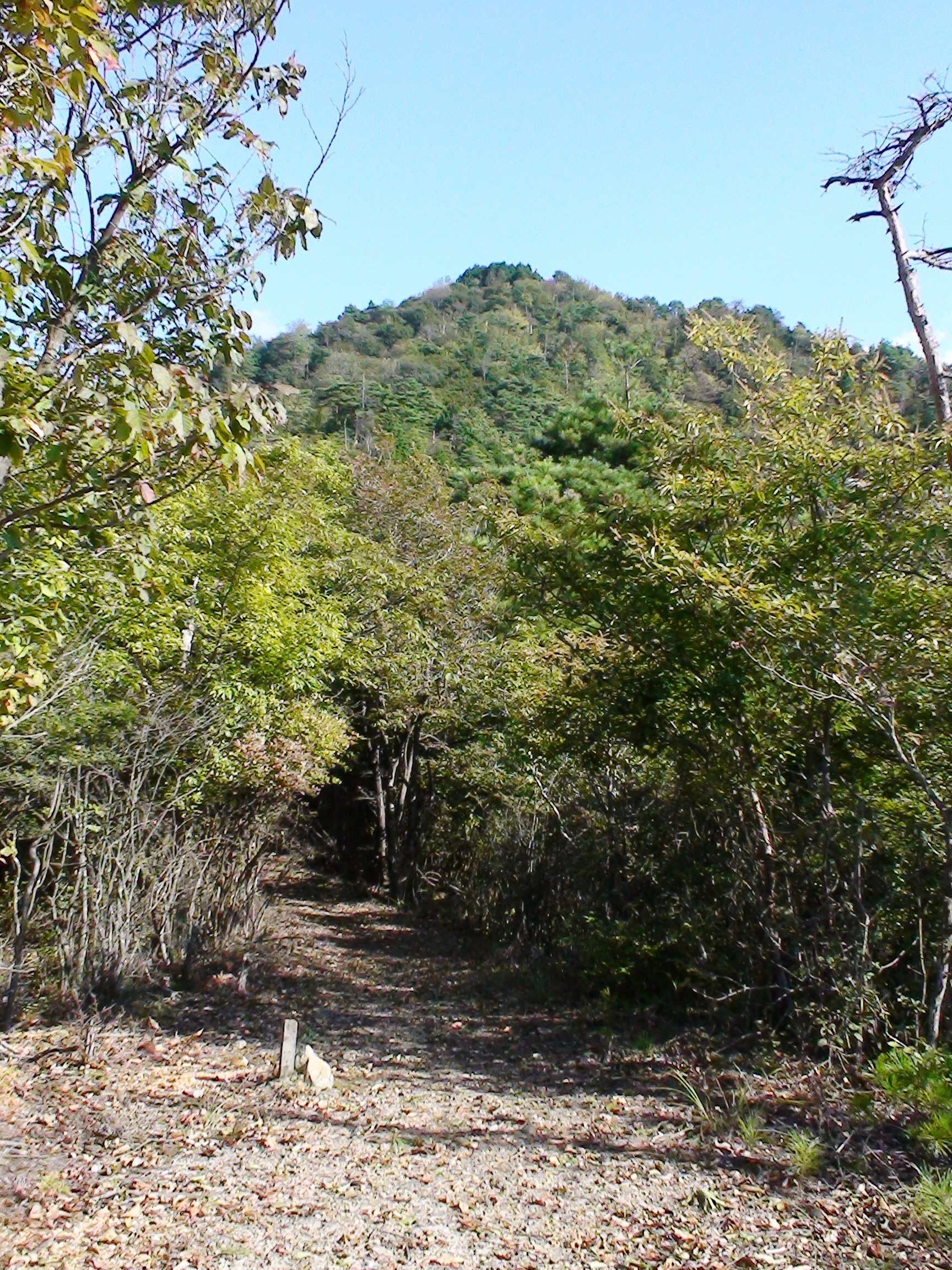
Mount Tashiro from the San-no-maru

== See also ==
- List of Historic Sites of Japan (Hyōgo)

== Literature ==
- De Lange, William (2021). An Encyclopedia of Japanese Castles. Groningen: Toyo Press. pp. 600 pages. ISBN 978-9492722300.
