= Nobutaka Shiōden =

Japanese politician

- 四王天 延孝
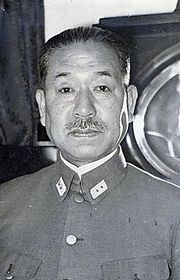

Member of the House of Representatives
- In office 30 April 1942 – 6 December 1945
- Preceded by: Multi-member district
- Succeeded by: Constituency abolished
- Constituency: Tokyo 5th

Personal details
- Born: 2 September 1878 Maebashi, Gunma, Japan
- Died: 8 August 1962 (aged 83) Shibuya, Tokyo, Japan
- Party: Imperial Rule Assistance Association

Military service
- Allegiance: Empire of Japan
- Branch/service: Imperial Japanese Army
- Years of service: 1899–1929
- Rank: Lieutenant General
- Battles/wars: Russo-Japanese War; Siberian Intervention

Nobutaka Shiōden (四王天 延孝, Shiōden Nobutaka; 2 September 1878 – 8 August 1962) was a lieutenant general in the Imperial Japanese Army, propagandist of a Jewish conspiracy theory during and after World War II and a legislator in the Diet of Japan.

== Biography ==
=== Military career ===
Shiōden was born to an ex-samurai of Maebashi Domain (present day Gunma Prefecture), but was adopted as a child by Shiōden Masaaki, an ex-samurai from Kawagoe Domain. He graduated from the 11th class of the Imperial Japanese Army Academy in November 1899, and was commissioned as a second lieutenant in the Guards Engineering Battalion. He was sent as a military engineer to the Japanese garrison force in the Chinese Empire, and served there during the Russo-Japanese War. Afterwards, he served in a number of administrative and staff positions within the Imperial Japanese Army General Staff. He graduated from the 21st class of the Army Staff College in 1909. he then served as a military engineer in the Kwantung Leased Territory, instructor at the Army Artillery School and was sent to France as a military attaché and official Japanese military observer during World War I. While in Paris, he was exposed to the common theory that an international Jewish conspiracy was behind the war, thereafter he began to research into issues related to Freemasonry, and the so-called “Jewish-problem”, as a result of which he became a fervent antisemite and leading voice of antisemitic propaganda in Japan.

In January 1920, he was assigned to the Vladivostok garrison during the Japanese Siberian intervention as afterwards commander of the Harbin Special Operations Office. This office was responsible for intelligence activities, counter-espionage, and analysis of political and military information about the USSR. Harbin was home to a large population of Russians, including many Jews.

A strong supporter of military aviation from his first-hand experiences in World War I, Shiōden returned to Japan in 1922 to assume command of the Army Aviation School. He later served on the Military Aviation Bureau within the General Staff. In 1924, he was promoted to major general. He subsequently served as Japanese Army delegate to the League of Nations, commander of Hōyo Fortress and on the staff of the IJA 16th Division and IJA 3rd Division. In August 1929 he was promoted to lieutenant general, and went into the reserves immediately thereafter.

=== Political career ===
After his retirement, Shiōden served in the largely honorary post as Chairman of the Imperial Aviation Association, which promoted the development of Japanese military aviation and ran donation campaigns for the funding of new aircraft, and as an official of the Kokuhonsha. In 1936, he translated The Protocols of the Learned Elders of Zion from French into Japanese. When the Ministry of Foreign Affairs founded a task force to study the role of Jews in international politics and economic affairs in 1936, Shiōden was appointed director. In 1938, he participated in an antisemitic conference in Erfurt in Nazi Germany and met with Julius Streicher the editor of the antisemitic newspaper Der Stürmer, in Nuremberg, The June 1939 edition of the paper dedicated a whole page to "General Shiōden, the anti-Semitic Japanese".

In July 1941, Shiōden published "The Jews: Their thoughts and movements" (Yudaya shisō oyobi undō), with an introduction by the former Prime Minister Kiichirō Hiranuma. The book described Shiōden's claim that Jews in different countries held excessive behind-the-scenes influence over governments and economics for the secret purpose of world domination.

Shiōden was elected to a seat in the House of Representatives in the Diet of Japan in 1942, and held the seat until December 1945 after the end of World War II.

After the surrender of Japan, Shiōden was arrested by the American occupation authorities, and was charged with Class A war crimes but was released in 1947 without coming to trial.

== See also ==
- Shiōden Masataka
- Antisemitism in Japan
