= Sakamoto Castle =

Castle in Ōtsu, Shiga, Japan

- 坂本城
- Otsu, Shiga Prefecture, Japan
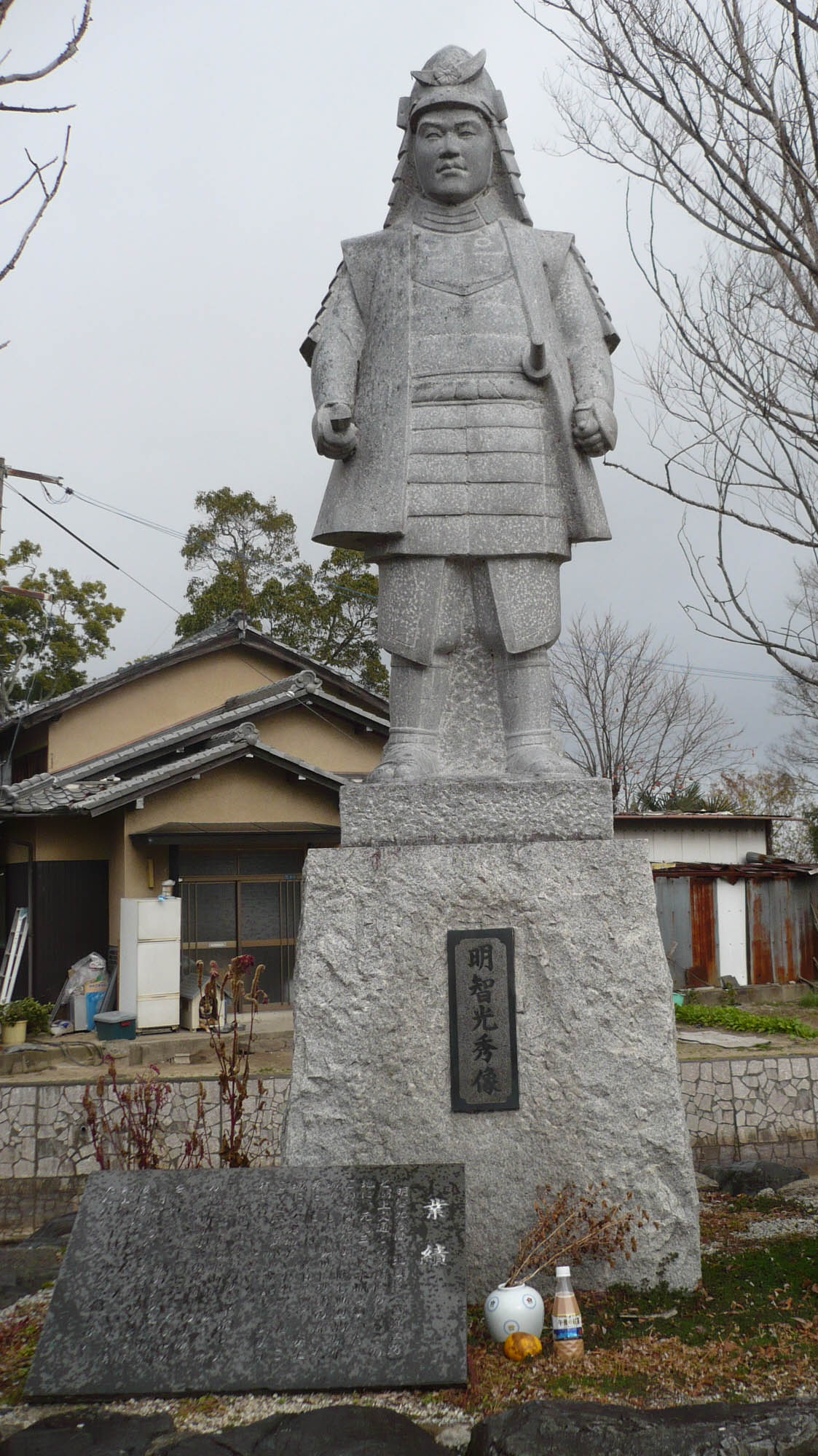
- Statue of Mitsuhide in Sakamoto Castle park

Site information
- Type: Mizu style castle
- Owner: Oda clan, Toyotomi clan
- Condition: ruins

Location
- Coordinates: 35°3′35.374″N 135°52′37.744″E

Site history
- Built: 1571
- Built by: Akechi Mitsuhide
- Demolished: 1586

Garrison information
- Past commanders: Akechi Mitsuhide, Niwa Nagahide, Asano Nagamasa

Sakamoto Castle (坂本城, Sakamoto-jō) was a lakeside castle in the Sengoku period, located in Ōtsu, Shiga Prefecture, Japan.

Akechi Mitsuhide was the commander of the castle.

== History ==
After the Siege of Mount Hiei, Sakamoto was given to Akechi Mitsuhide who built Sakamoto Castle under orders from the warlord Oda Nobunaga because Sakamoto was a strategically important place to rule. Luís Fróis described the castle as the second best castle in Japan at the time.

After the loss of Battle of Yamazaki, Mitsuhide tried to return to the castle but he was killed on the way. Surrounded by Toyotomi's army, Mitsuhide's adopted son Akechi Hidemitsu set fire to the castle and killed himself.

In 1583, Sakamoto castle was given to Niwa Nagahide and he rebuilt the castle. In 1586, Asano Nagamasa abandoned the castle and moved to Ōtsu Castle by Toyotomi Hideyoshi's order. (Stones and materials were transferred to Ōtsu Castle.)

Nowadays nothing remains of the original castle, and a statue of Akechi Mitsuhide stands in Sakamoto Castle's park. (Low stone wall remains in the Lake Biwa and can be seen when the water level drops.) A gate from Sakamoto Castle was relocated to Saikyō-ji Temple near the castle. (Akechi clan's tombs are also at Saikyō-ji Temple.)

== Gallery ==
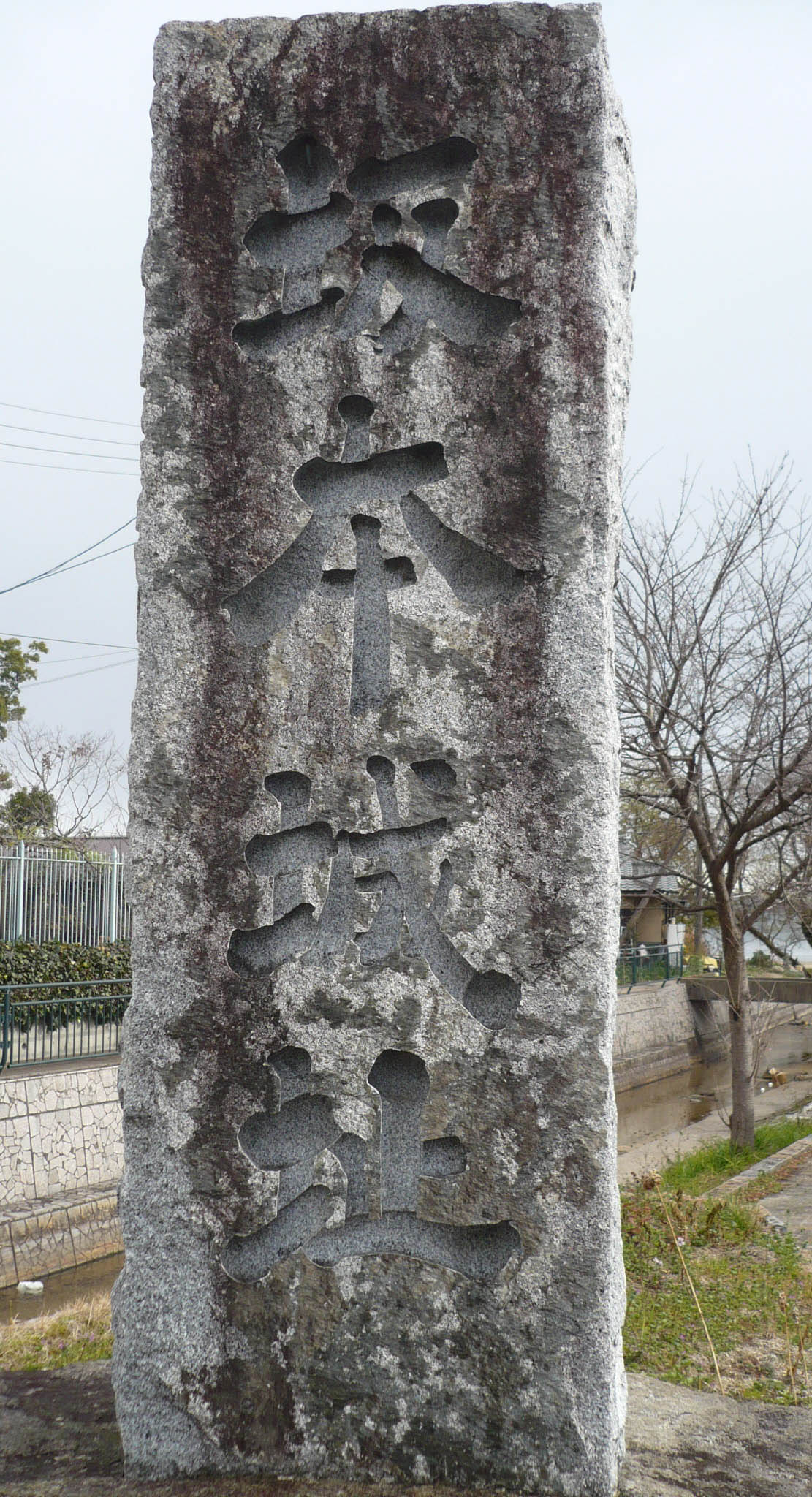
Monument of Sakamoto Castle

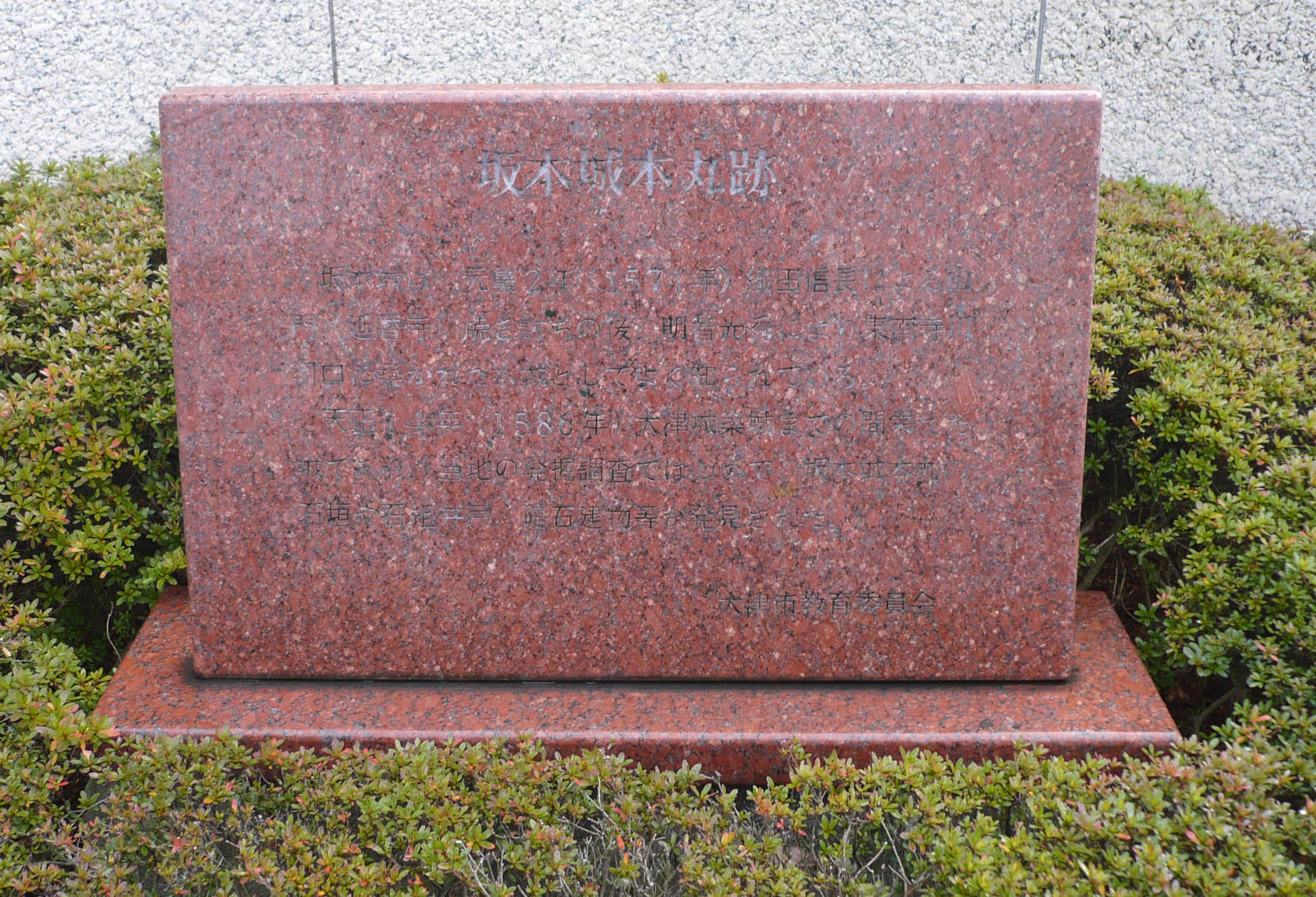
Monument of Sakamoto Castle Honmaru base

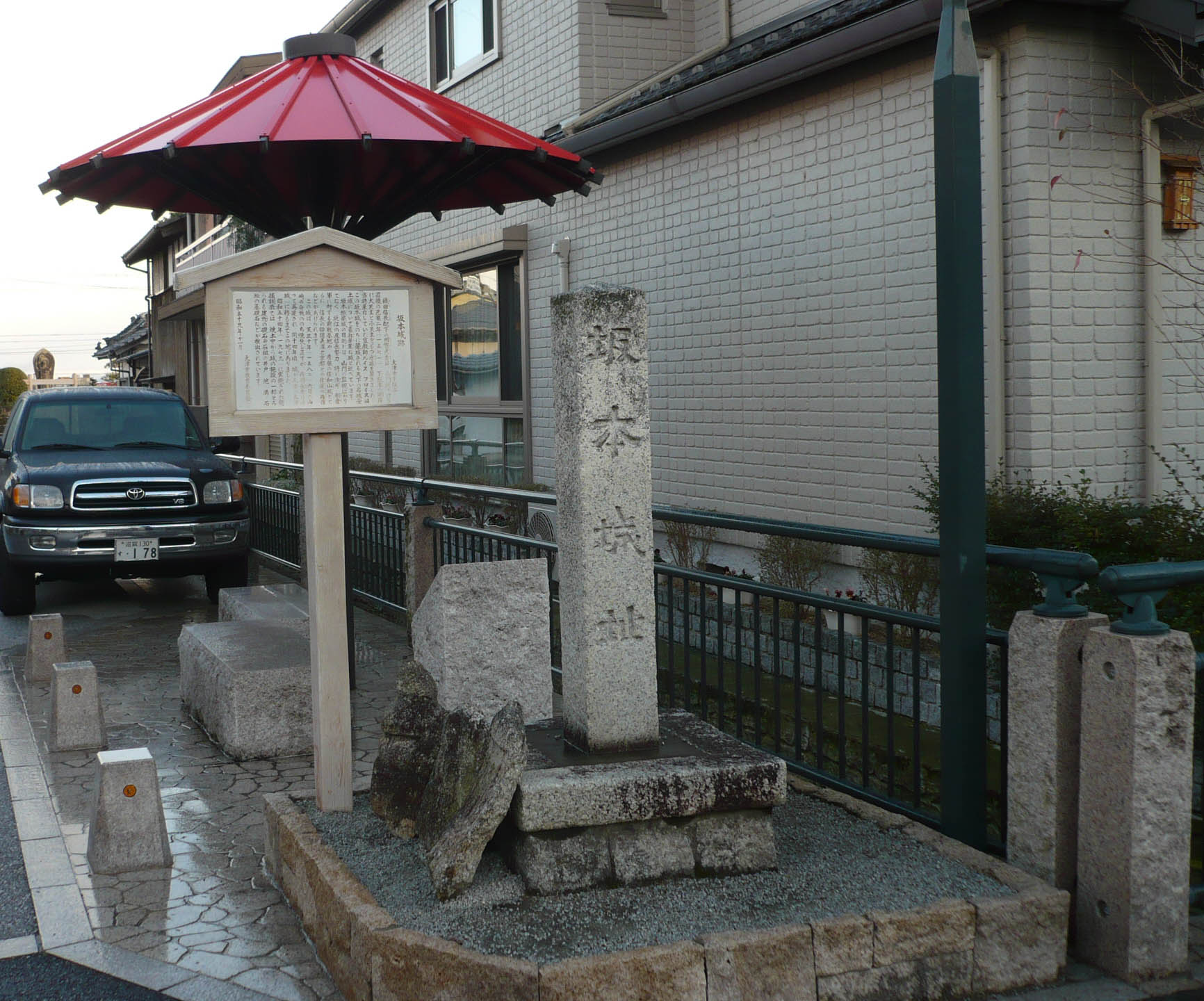
Monument of Sakamoto Castle Ninomaru base

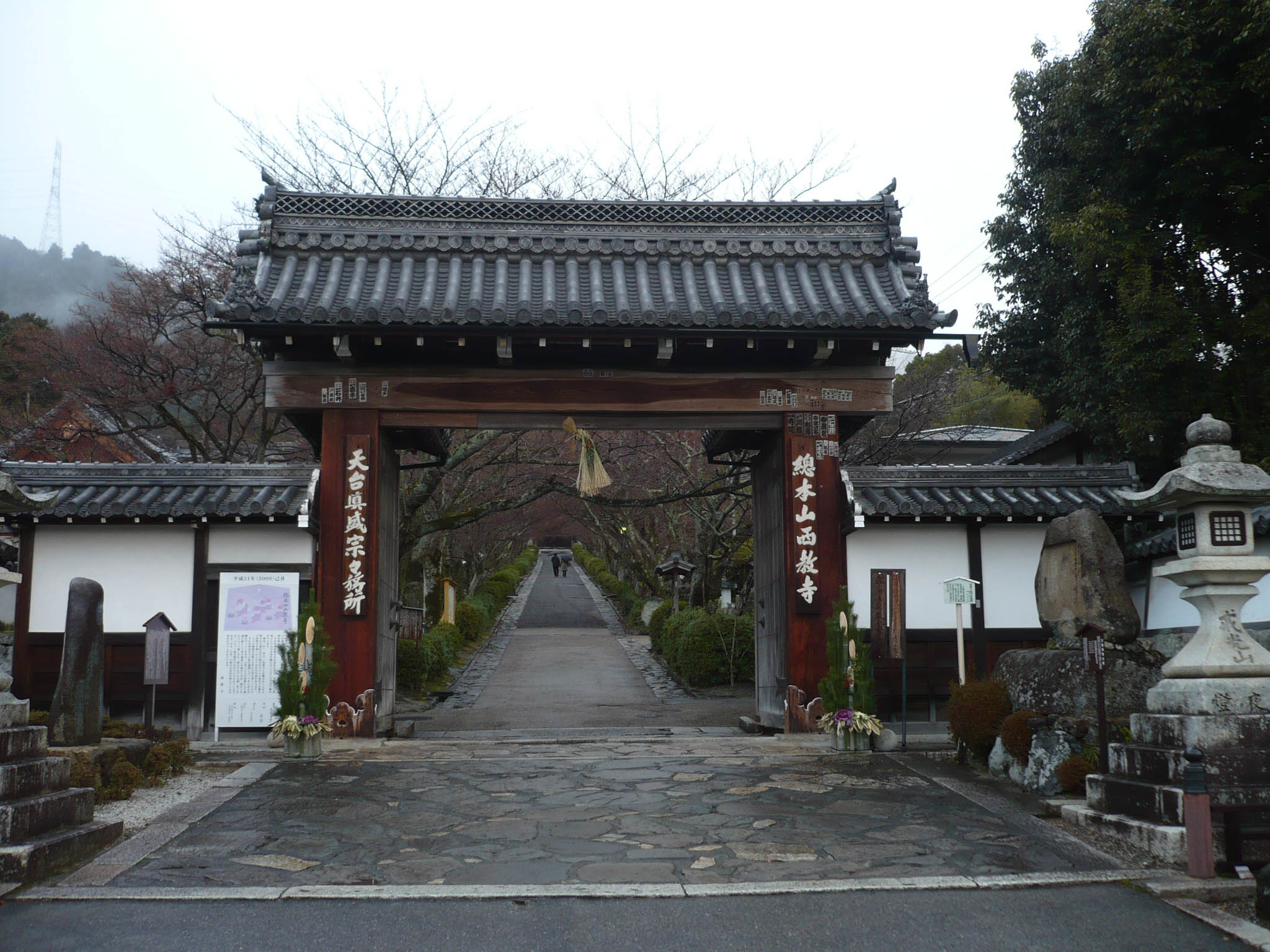
Former Sakamoto Castle's gate (Gate of Saikyo-ji Temple)

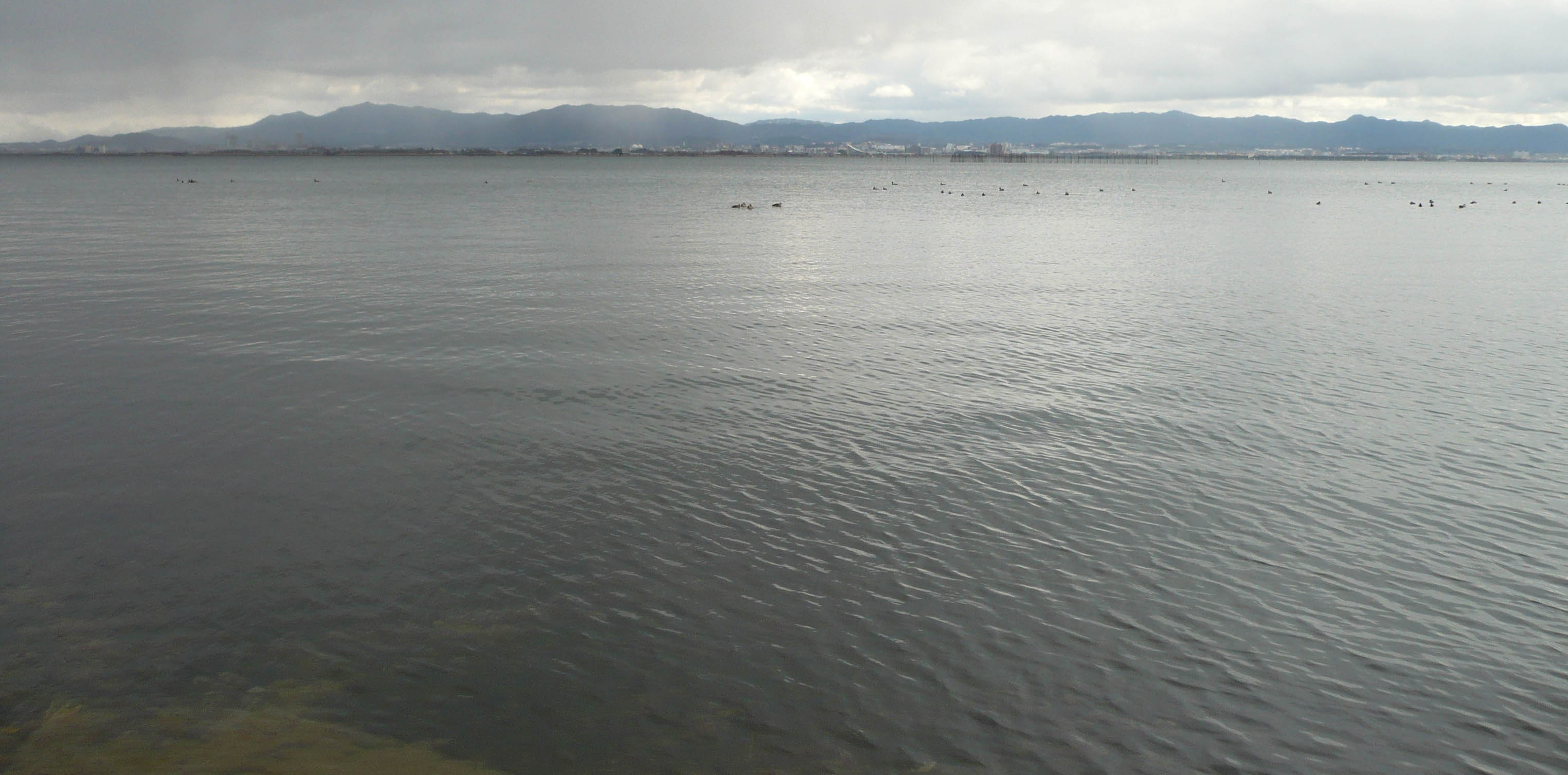
View from Sakamoto Castle park
