= Hatano Hideharu =

Head of the Hatano clan

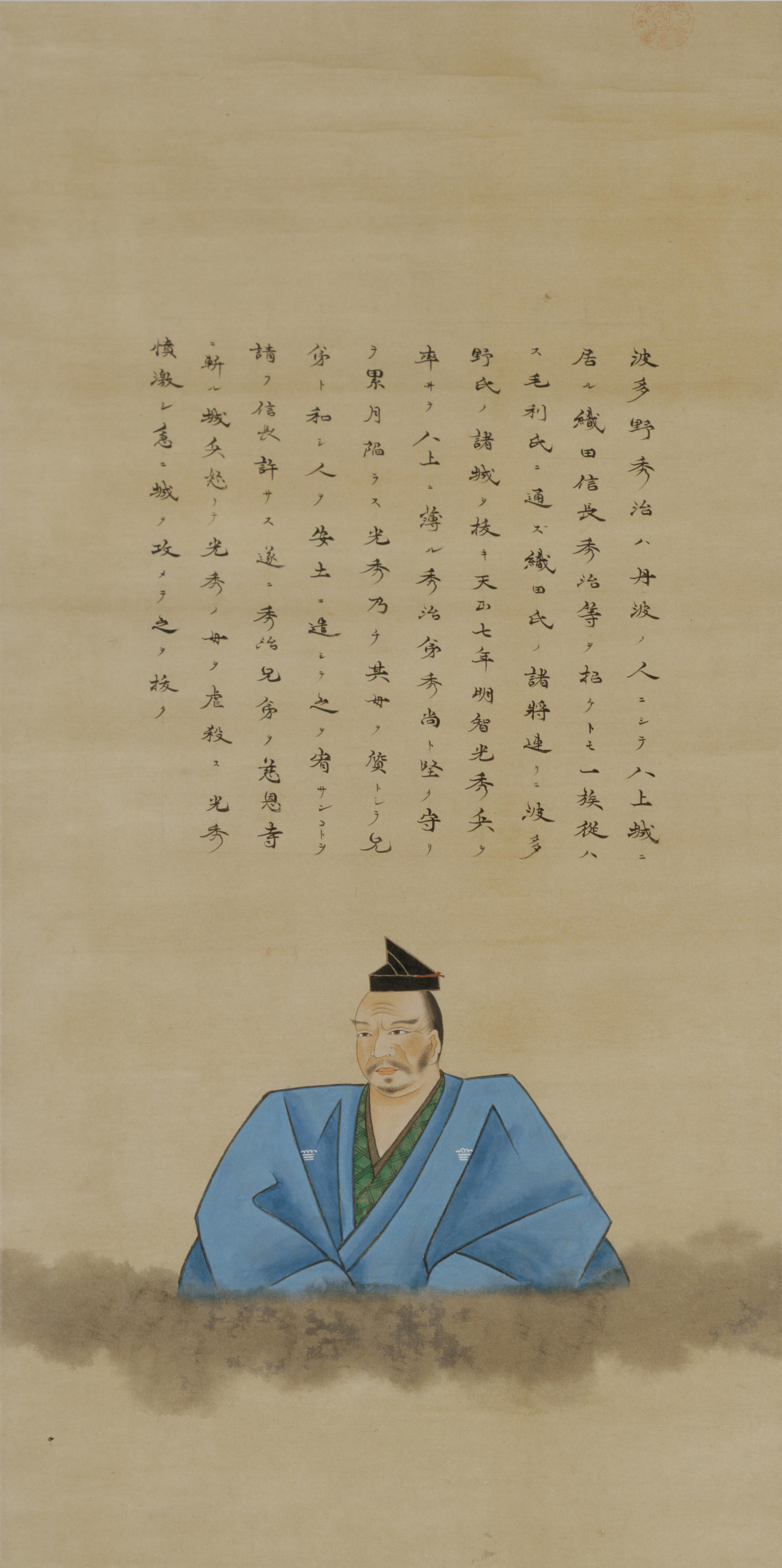
Portrait of Hatano Hideharu

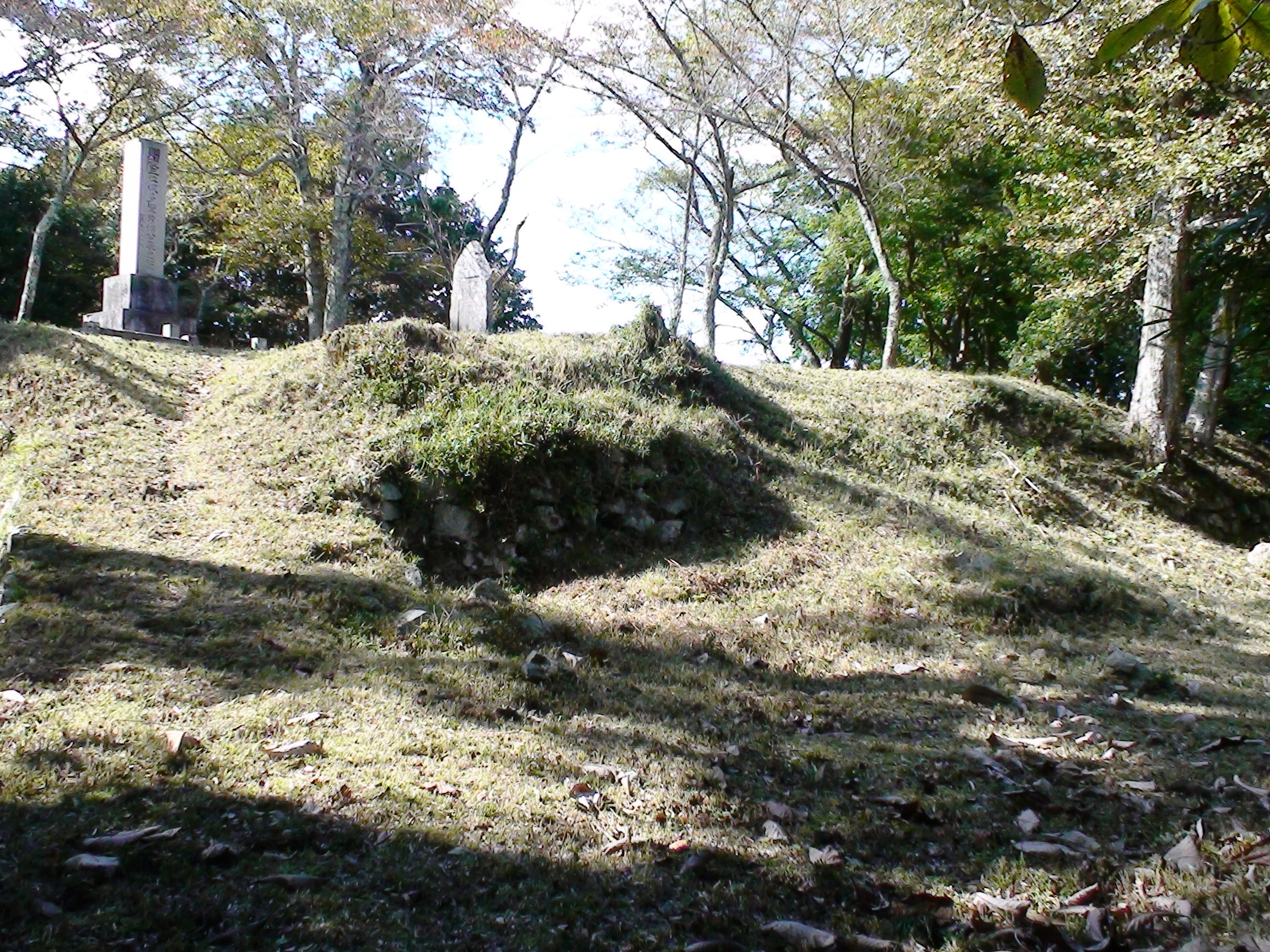
Honmaru compound of Yakami Castle

Hatano Hideharu (波多野 秀治 Hatano Hideharu, 1541 – June 25, 1579) was the eldest son of Hatano Harumichi and the head of Hatano clan. He was a son of Harumichi, but for an unknown reason, he was adopted as a son by Hatano Motohide.

The Hatano clan had, from the time of Hideharu's grandfather Hatano Tanemichi, been retainers to the powerful Miyoshi clan and its leader Miyoshi Nagayoshi. Following tradition Hideharu had been the Miyoshi's retainer as well. The reason that such a minor clan as his had attended the Emperor Ōgimachi's coronation is believed to be due to the influence of Nagayoshi.

Hideharu became independent in 1565 after Nagayoshi died, capturing Yakami Castle, which Hideharu took as his place of residence.

The Hatano clan's land, however, was situated in the way of Oda Nobunaga's passage to Kyoto and after several battles, Hideharu surrendered to Nobunaga's general Akechi Mitsuhide. In 1576, Hideharu declared independence and turned against Nobunaga. Infuriated, Nobunaga again ordered Mitsuhide to invade Tanba Province, but Hideharu remained in the castle and held together a resistance for three years. The leader of the Hatano Clan's retainers, the Akai clan, Akai Naomasa, also known as Hatano Naomasa, died defending the Hatano stronghold of Kuroi Castle against Akechi Mitsuhide at the start of the resistance in 1576.

According to a record kept by Oda clan, Mitsuhide offered his mother as a hostage to allow to Hideharu surrender with dignity. Hideharu complied knowing that he could not hold out indefinitely. However, after arriving at Azuchi Castle to offer an apology, Hideharu was executed by Nobunaga. His troops in Yakami Castle, hearing that Hideharu had been executed, killed Mitsuhide's mother. This incident strained the relationship between Nobunaga and Mitsuhide, eventually culminating in Mitsuhide killing Nobunaga at Honnō-ji in 1582. However, there is little evidence that these events actually happened and it is unlikely Mitsuhide would offer such questionable truce. There are a number of different accounts of Hideharu's defeat, including one claiming he was captured by Akechi's general Shiōden Masataka. After Hideharu's death, no one rose to hold together the Hatano clan and the clan eventually split apart. With there still being direct descendants today but very few still remain.
