= Akai Naomasa =

- Born: 1529
- Died: April 8, 1578 (aged 48–49)
- Other name: Red Demon of Tamba Province

Akai Naomasa (赤井 直正; 1529 – April 8, 1578) was a Japanese samurai leader of the Sengoku period. He was known for his bravery and skill as a warrior, so his nickname became 'red Oni (demon) of Tamba Province'.

Naomasa is known for his defense of Kuroi Castle in Tamba Province. In 1578, during the siege of Kuroi Castle, he died of disease; and the responsibility for defending the castle passed to his nephew, Akai Tadaie.

After the death of Akai Naomasa, some members of the Akai clan became retainers under Tōdō Takatora.
