= Chitose Kurumazuka Kofun =

Burial mound in Kameoka, Kyoto, Japan

Chitose-Kurumazuka Kofun
- 千歳車塚古墳 (Japanese)
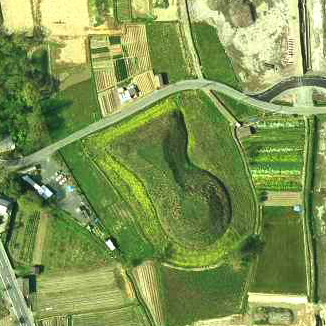
- Chitose-Kurumazuka Kofun

- Chitose-Kurumazuka Kofun Kofun Chitose Kurumazuka Kofun (Japan)
- 35°3′25.34″N 135°34′14.40″E
- Type: Kofun
- Periods: Kofun period
- Location: Kameoka, Kyoto, Japan
- Region: Kansai region

History
- Built: c.early-6th century

Site notes
- Public access: Yes
- National Historic Site of Japan

The Chitose-Kurumazuka Kofun (千歳車塚古墳) is a Kofun period burial mound, located in the Chitose neighborhood of the city of Kameoka, Kyoto in the Kansai region of Japan. The tumuli was designated a National Historic Site of Japan in 1982. It is estimated to have been built in the first half of the 6th century (the first half of the late Kofun period), and is the largest tumulus in the Tamba region. Per local legend, it is the tomb of King Yahiko (the 14th grandson of Emperor Chuai).

== Overview ==
The Chitose-Kurumazuka Kofun is located on a small hill extending from Mt. Inatsuki in the northeastern part of the Kameoka Basin, on the left bank of the Oi River. It is a zenpō-kōen-fun (前方後円墳), which is shaped like a keyhole, having one square end and one circular end, when viewed from above. The tumulus is orientated to the northwest and has a current overall length of 82 meters, but may have been up to 88 meters long. It is somewhat unusual in shape in that the width of the anterior part exceeds the diameter of the posterior circle. The left constriction of the mound may have a ceremonial platform. The tumulus was once covered in fukiishi and had rows of cylindrical haniwa. The tumulus was surrounded by two concentric moats, of which traces of the inner moat still remain. Another unusual feature of the tumulus is that the moats are asymmetrical with respect to the main axis of the burial mound, for unknown reasons. The burial chamber has not been excavated, so details remain uncertain.

The design of the tumulus resembles that of the Imashirozuka Kofun in Takatsuki, Osaka, which is believed to be the true tomb of Emperor Keitai, and to date from the same period, leading to the theory is that the person buried here was a candidate for succession to the throne of the same rank as Emperor Keitai. Analysis of the clay used indicates that the haniwa were produced at the Shinike Hanawa Production Site in Takatsuki. This indicates a strong connection between the Yamato kingship and the person buried in this tumulus.

The tumulus was designated as a Kameoka City Historic Site in 1970 and was elevated to a National Historic Site in 1982. In the surrounding area are the ichinomiya of Tanba Province, Izumo-daijingū and the ruins of the Tanba Kokubun-ji and Tanba Kokubun-niji.

Total length
82 meters (original length: 88 meters)
Anterior rectangular portion
49 meters wide x 7 meters high, 3-tier (original width: 54 meters)
Posterior circular portion
46 meter diameter x 7.5 meters high, 3-tiers (original diameter: 54 meters)

== Gallery ==
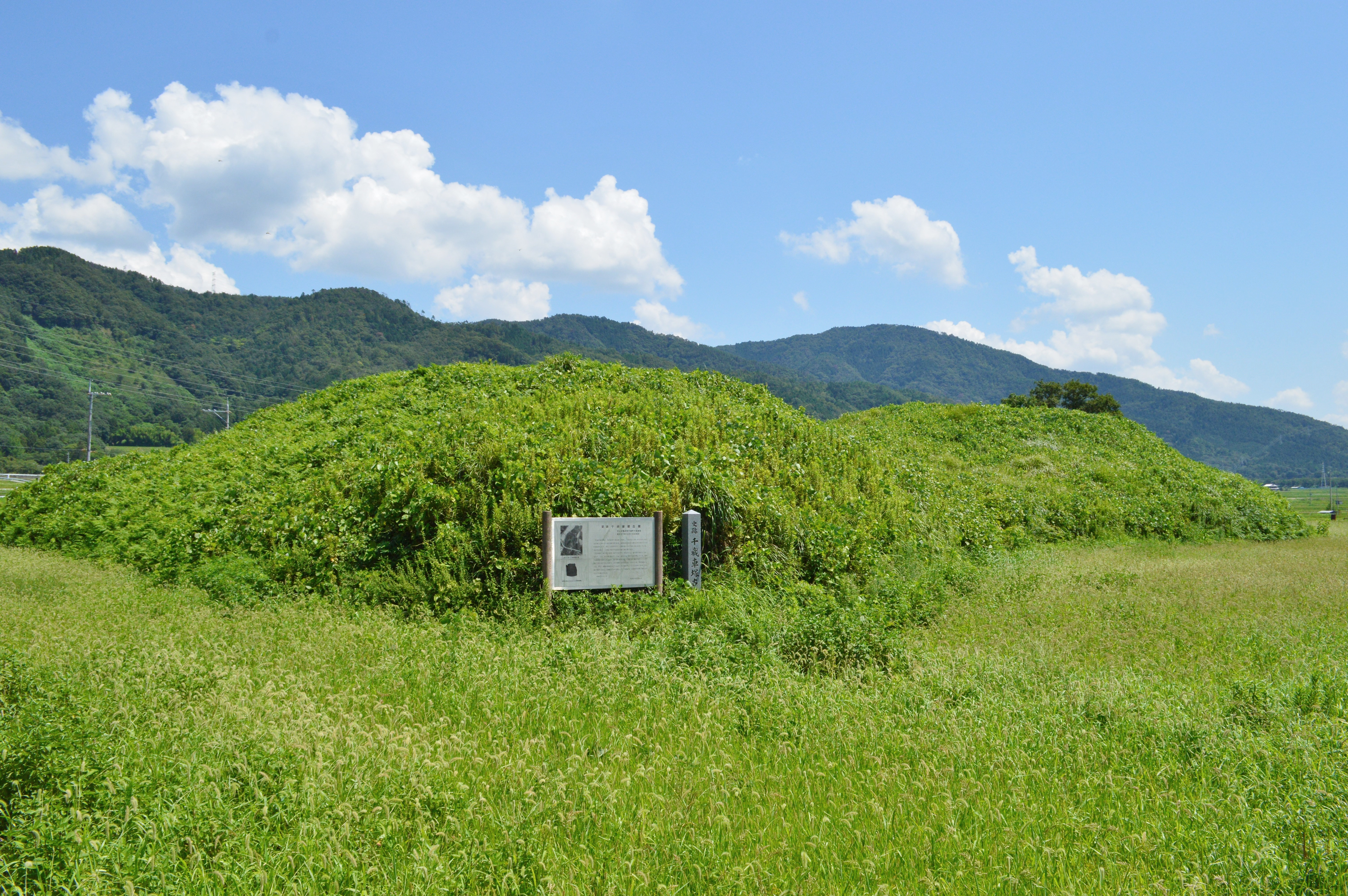
Chitose-Kurumazuka Kofun

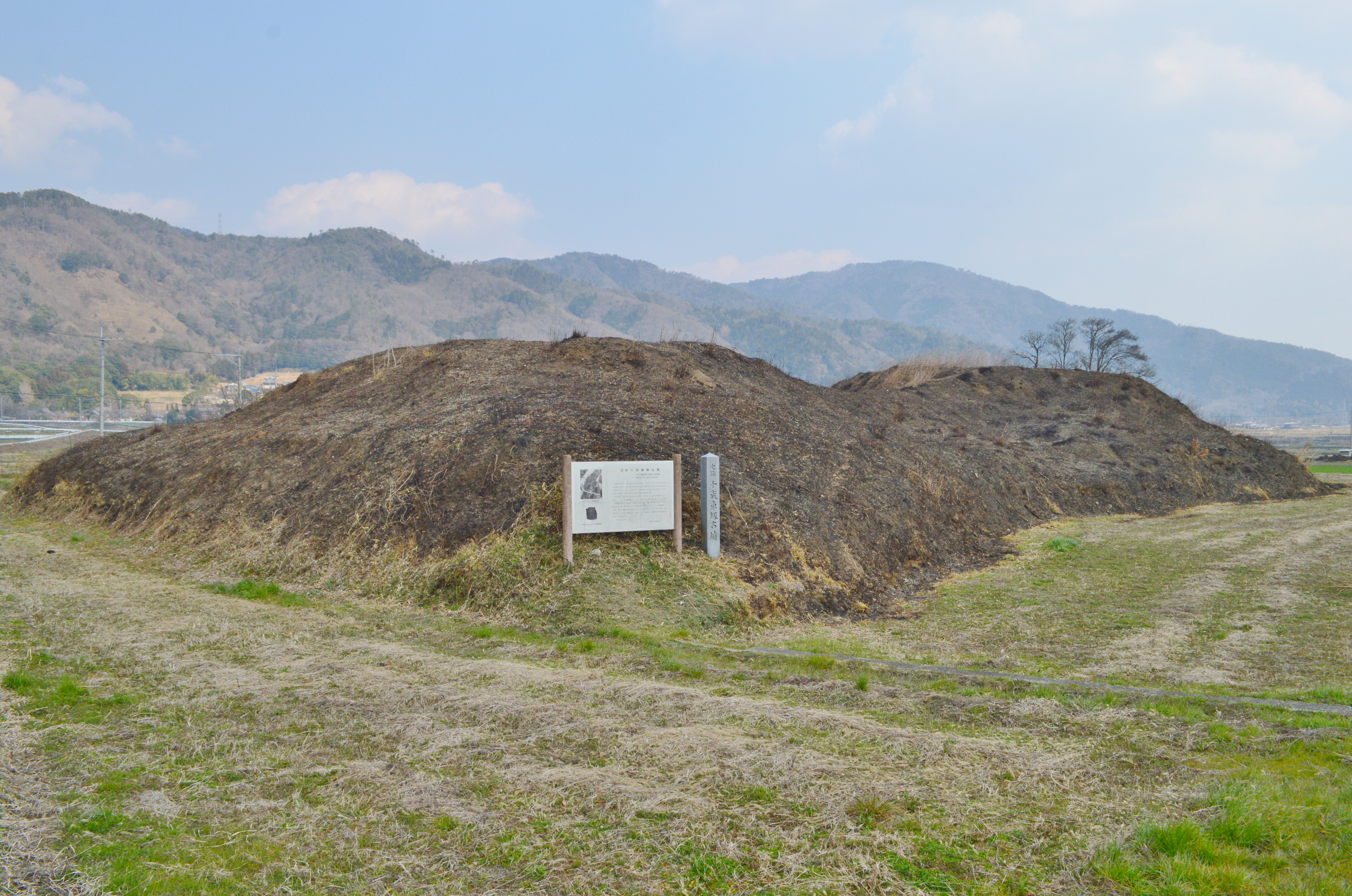
Chitose-Kurumazuka Kofun after grass is burned off in spring

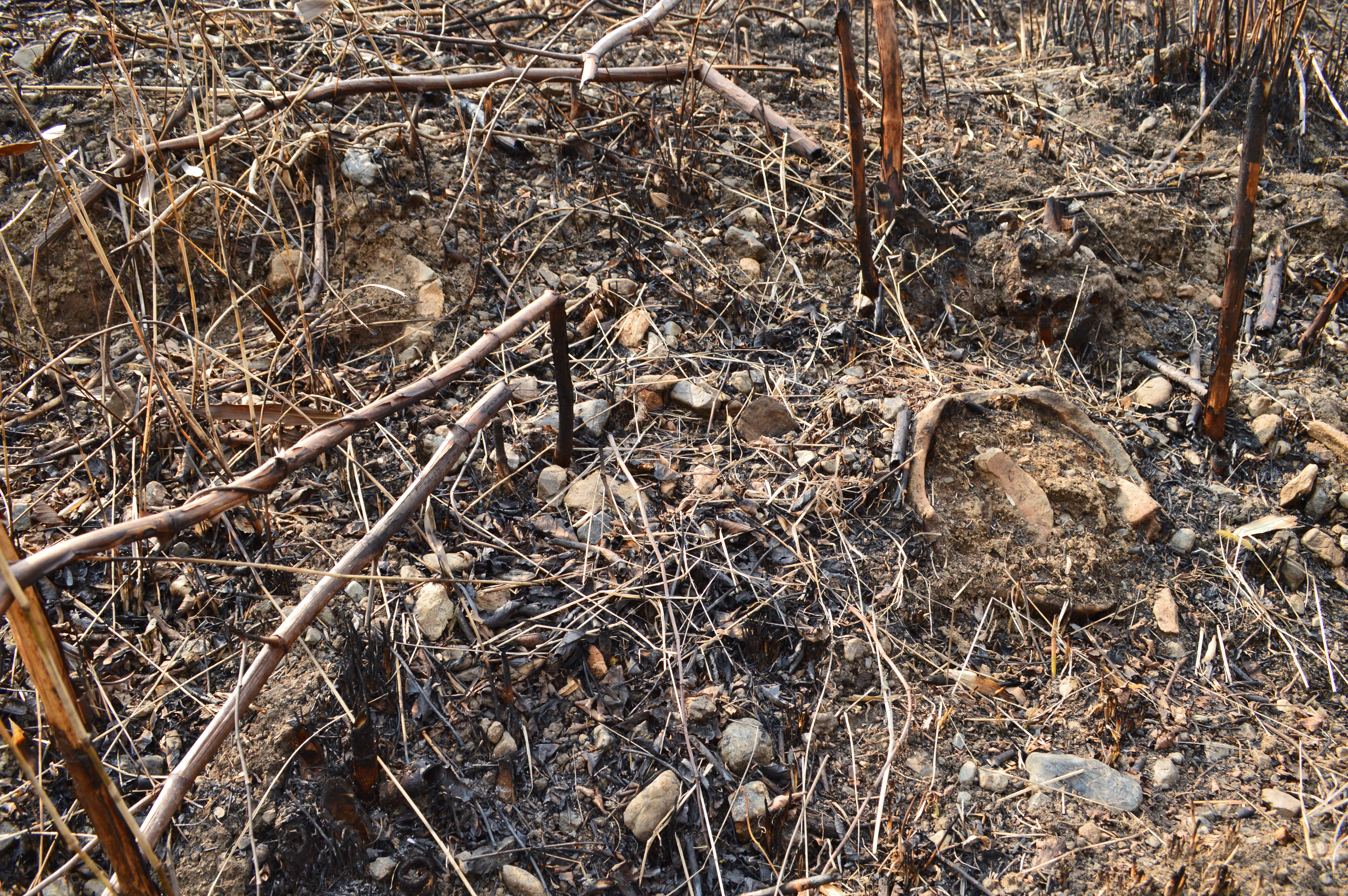
Fragments of haniwa in situ.

== See also ==
- List of Historic Sites of Japan (Kyoto)
