= Tanba Kokubun-ji =

Buddhist temple in Kyoto Prefecture, Japan

Tanba Kokubun-ji 丹波国分寺
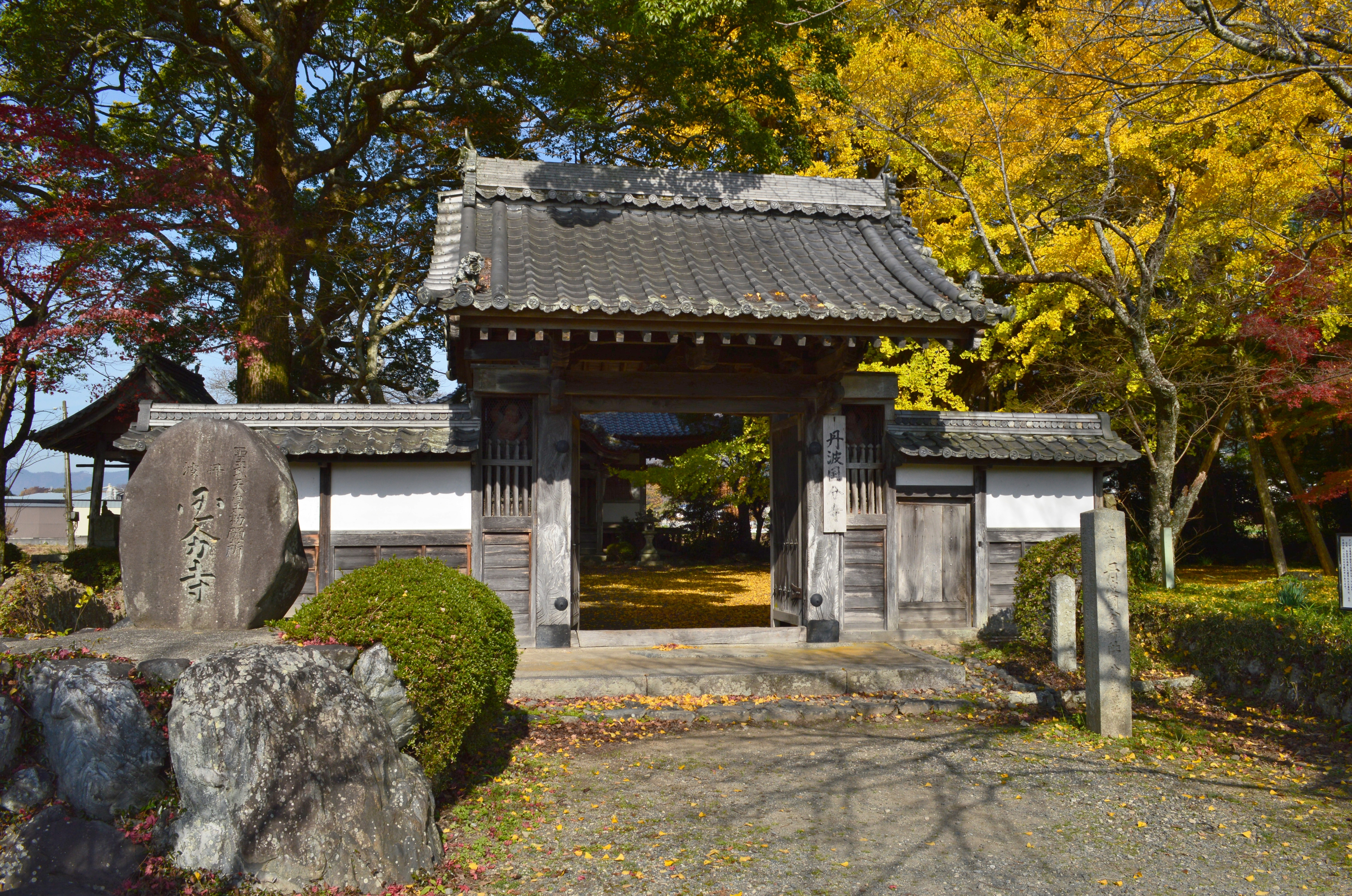
- Tanba Kokubun-ji Sanmon

- Tanba Kokubun-ji Tanba Kokubun-ji (Japan)

Religion
- Affiliation: Buddhist
- Deity: Yakushi Nyōrai
- Rite: Jōdo-shū

Location
- Location: 59 Kokubun, Miyazu-shi, Kyoto-fu 629-2234
- Country: Japan
- Interactive map of Tanba Kokubun-ji 丹波国分寺
- Coordinates: 35°02′32.07″N 135°34′42.67″E

Architecture
- Founder: Emperor Shōmu
- Completed: c.741
- National Historic Site of Japan Important Cultural Property

Tanba Kokubun-ji (丹波国分寺) is a Buddhist temple in the Chitose neighborhood of the city of Kameoka, Kyoto, Japan. It belongs to the Jōdo-shū sect, and its honzon is a Heian period statue of Yakushi Nyōrai. It claims to be the successor to one of the provincial temples established by Emperor Shōmu during the Nara period (710–794). Due to this connection, the foundation stones of the Nara period temple now located to the south of the present day complex were designated as a National Historic Site in 1928 with the area under protection extended in 2006.

== History ==
The Shoku Nihongi records that in 741, as the country recovered from a major smallpox epidemic, Emperor Shōmu ordered that a monastery and nunnery be established in every province, the kokubunji (国分寺). These temples were built to a semi-standardized template, and served both to spread Buddhist orthodoxy to the provinces, and to emphasize the power of the Nara period centralized government under the Ritsuryō system.

The Tanba Kokubun-ji is located is located on an alluvial fan to the east of the Oi River in the Kameoka Basin. This area was the center of ancient Tanba Province, and in the near vicinity is the Chitose Kurumazuka Kofun and the ichinomiya of the province, the Izumo-daijingū. The exact date of its construction is unknown but it is believed to be at the end of the Nara period from excavated roof tiles. It is mentioned in the Engishiki as being assigned 40,000 bundles of rice for its upkeep. Per excavations conducted from 1982 to 1987, the temple occupied a square compound, 218 meters on each side. The layout of buildings was based on Hokki-ji in Ikaruga, Nara, and consisted of a Kondō and Pagoda side by side, surrounded by a cloister with a Middle Gate, Lecture Hall, and monks quarters. The main hall measured 15.8 by 11.6 meters, and was perhaps a five by four bay structure. The pagoda was seven-story structure, 15.7 meters on each side. All of its 17 foundation stones have survived. The Lecture Hall overlaps the site of the current temple's Main Hall. It measured 26.8 by 14.9 meters and was a seven by four bay structure. From the style of roof tiles, it appears that the temple was reconstructed at the beginning of the Heian period and again towards the end of the Heian period. However, the subsequent history of the temple is unclear.

The temple was destroyed by Akechi Mitsuhide during the Sengoku period, and the existing main hall, Belfry and Sanmon were rebuilt in 1774 and are all Kameoka City Important Cultural Properties. The temple is currently administered by the Sennin-ji, located in Kameoka.

In the exclave to the northeast of the temple are the ruins of a Hachiman Shrine, which is considered to be the guardian shrine of the Kokubun-ji. It is also included within the National Historic Site designation.

== Tanba Kokubun-niji ==
Site of Tanba Kokubunji Nunnery

The site of the provincial nunnery associated with the Tanba Kokubun-ji has been identified as the Oshoninbayashi temple ruins (御上人林廃寺跡) in the Kawarajiri, Kawarabayashi-cho neighborhood of Kameoka, about 450 meters west of the Tanba Kokubunji. It is located across the ancient San'indō highway from Sodera, and the southern limit of the temple grounds is on the same jōri line as the site of the Great South Gate. It is not part of the National Historic site, and only an explanatory board remains today.

The temple grounds are 1.5 cho square (about 165 meters square). The temple complex was patterned after Todai-ji in Nara, with a South Gate, Middle Gate, Kondō, and Lecture Hall lined up in a straight line from north to south. The Kondo was approximately 27 meters east to west, and 18 meters north to south. It is estimated to have 5 bays across and 4 bays across the beams. The Lecture hall measured 25.8 meters east to west, 16.8 meters north to south and was a 5 by 4 bay structure.

Roof tiles with the same pattern as those at the ruins of Tanba Kokubun-ji Temple have been excavated, as well as earthenware from the Nara period to the Heian period.

== Cultural Properties ==
=== National Important Cultural Properties ===
- "Wooden Yakush Nyorai seated statue" (木造薬師如来坐像), late Heian period, designated a national Important Cultural Property in 1917.

== Gallery ==
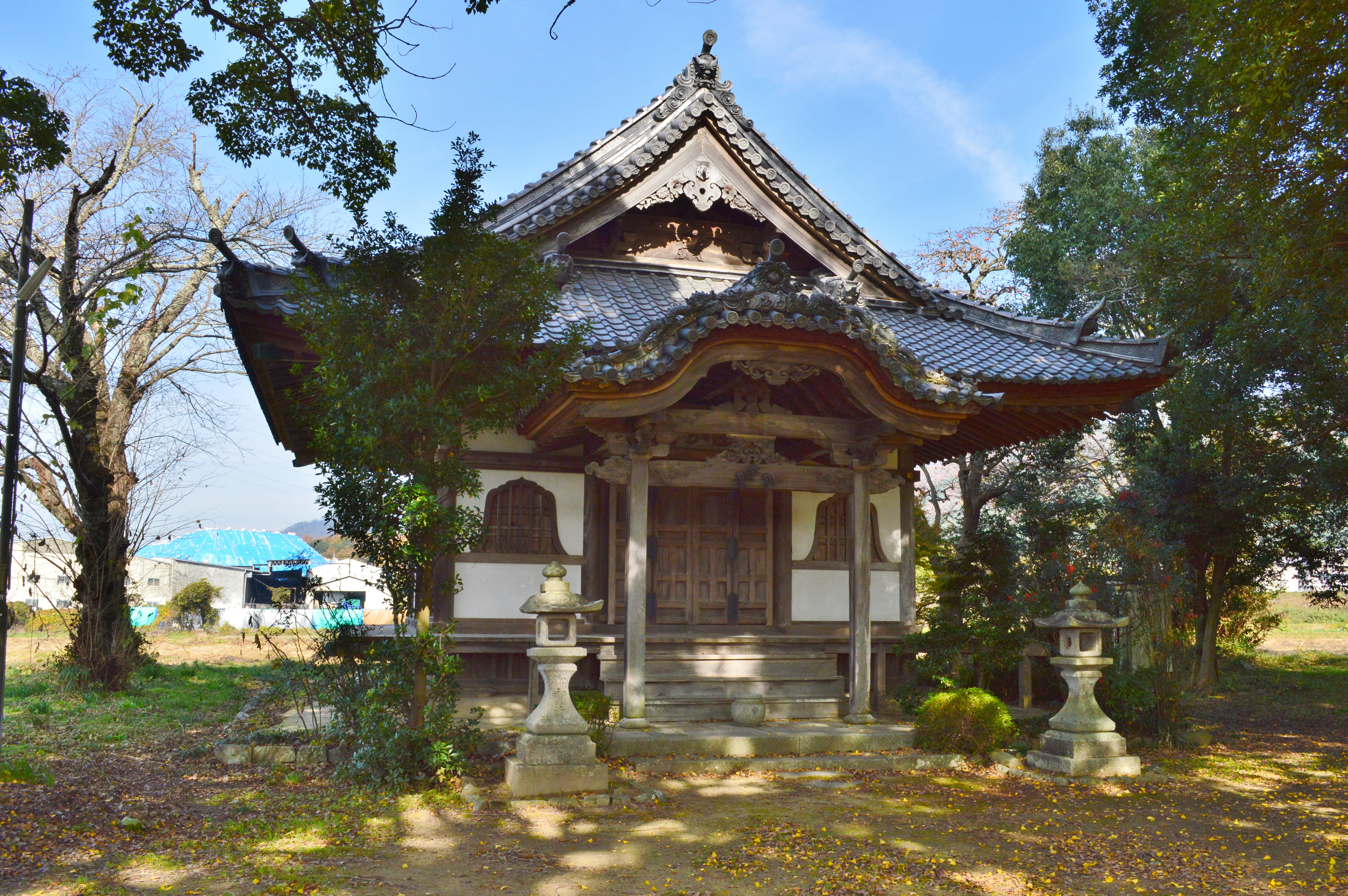
Main Hall, (Kameoka City ICP)

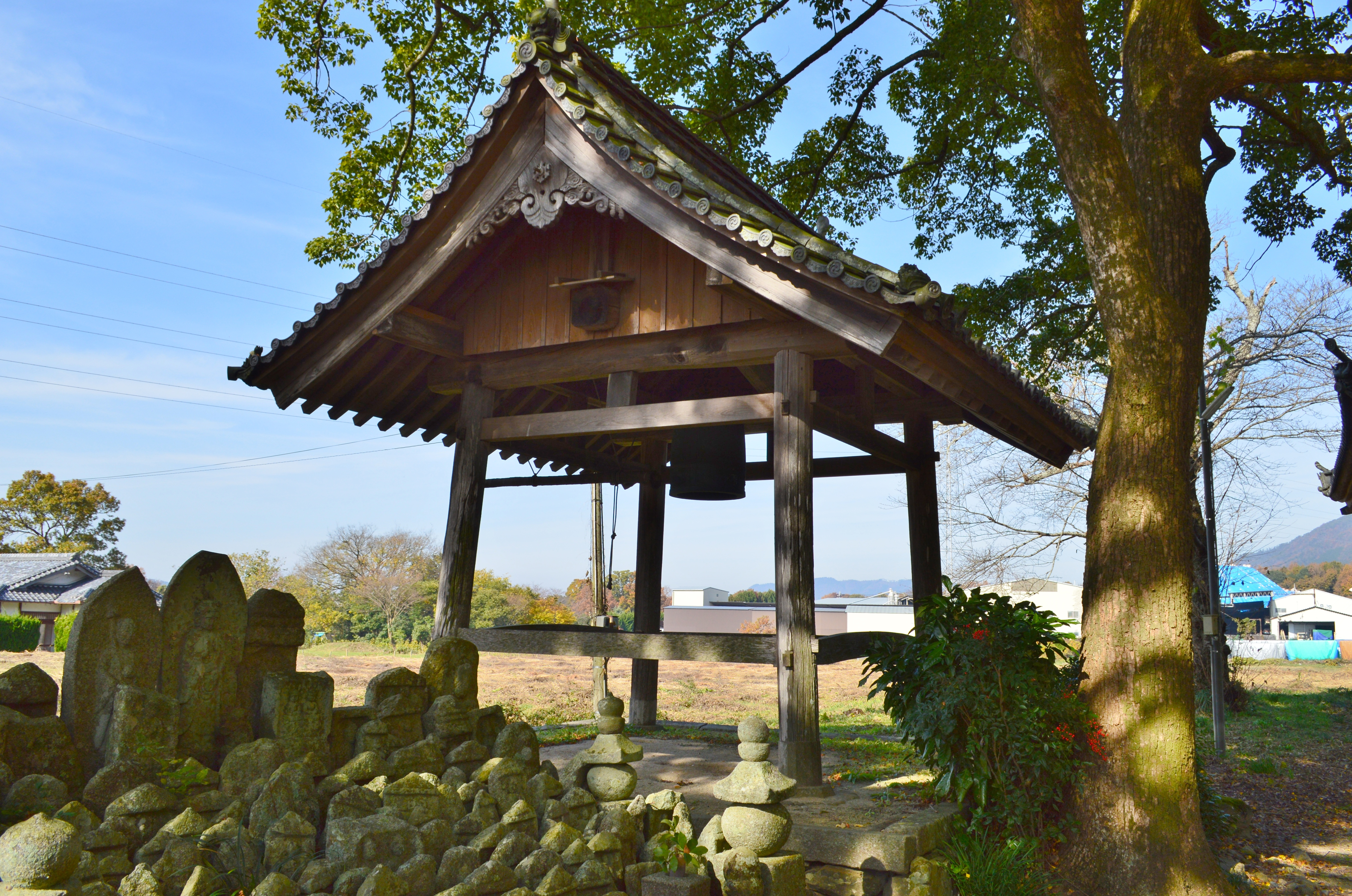
Belfryo (Kameoka City ICP)

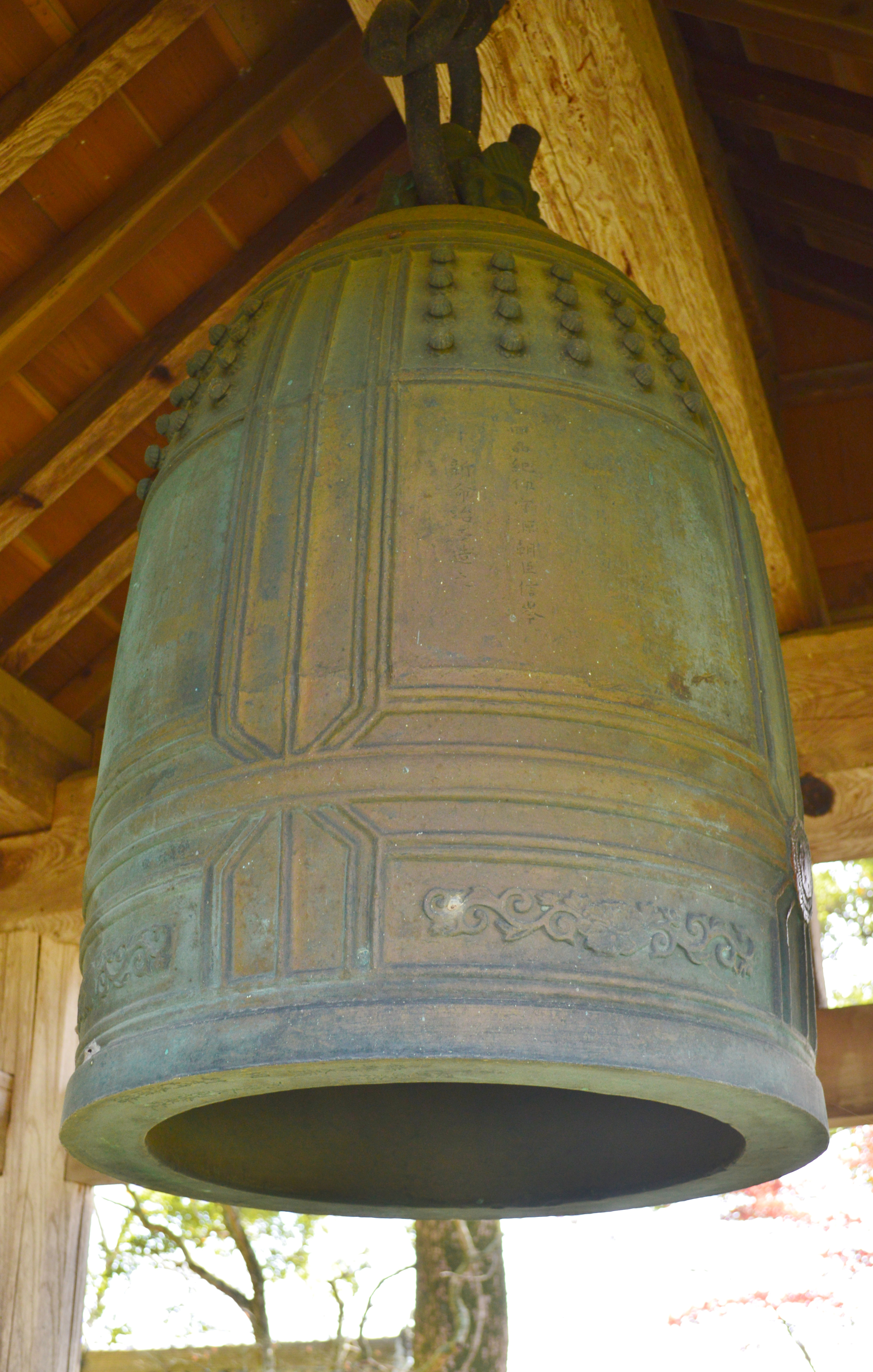
Bonsho (Kameoka City ICP)

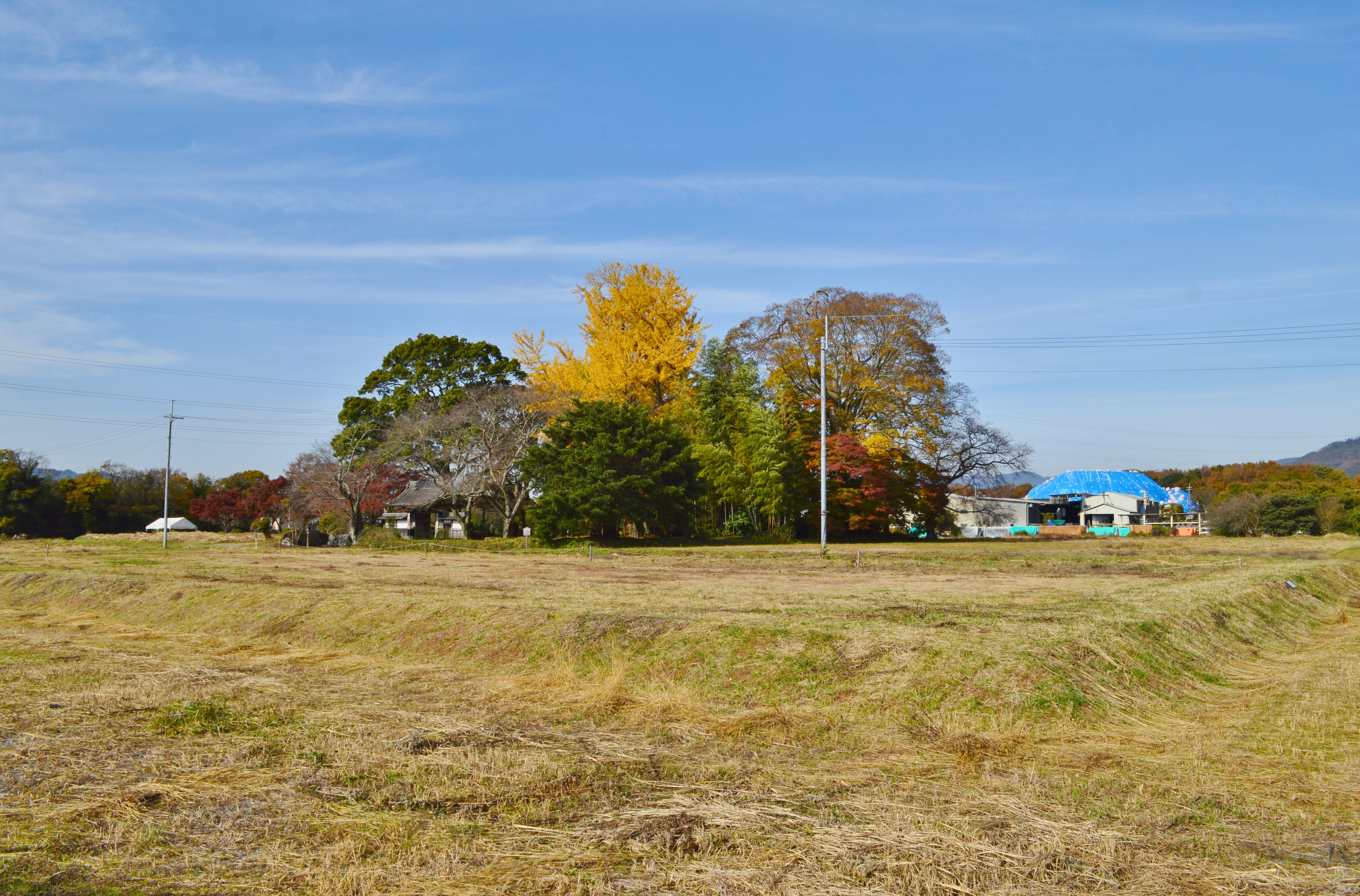
Site of the ancient Tanba Kokubun-ji

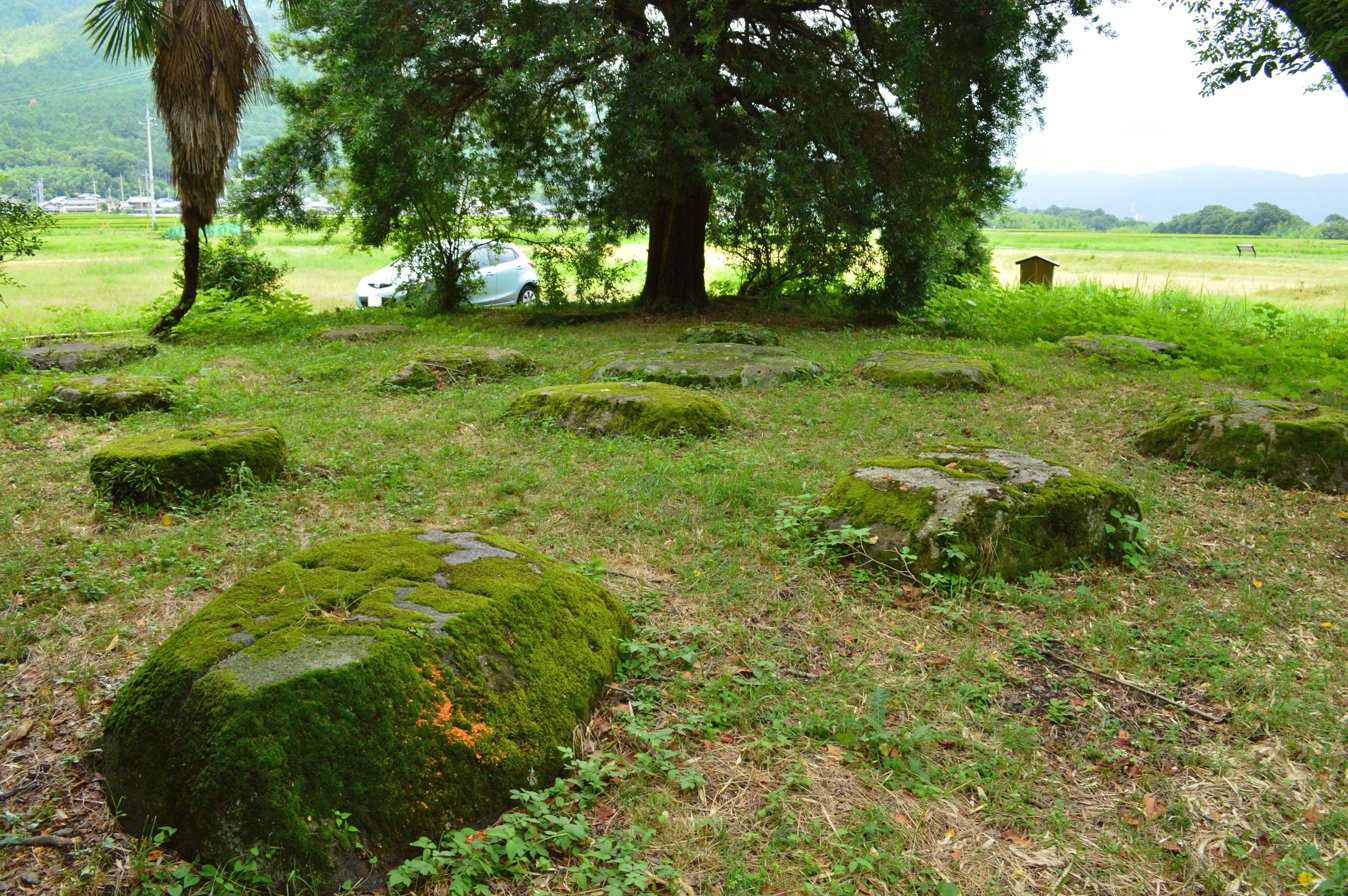
Foundation stones of the ancient Pagoda

== See also ==
- List of Historic Sites of Japan (Kyoto)
- provincial temple
