= Yamaga Domain =

Japanese feudal domain located in Tanba Province

Yamaga Domain 山家藩
- under Tokugawa shogunate Japan
- 1582–1871
- Capital: Yamaga jin'ya
- Area
  - Coordinates: 35°17′48.5″N 135°7′46.8″E
  - Type: Daimyō
- Historical era: Edo period
  - Established: 1582
  - Disestablished: 1871
- Today part of: part of Kyoto Prefecture

Location of Yamaga jin'ya
Yamaga Domain (Japan)

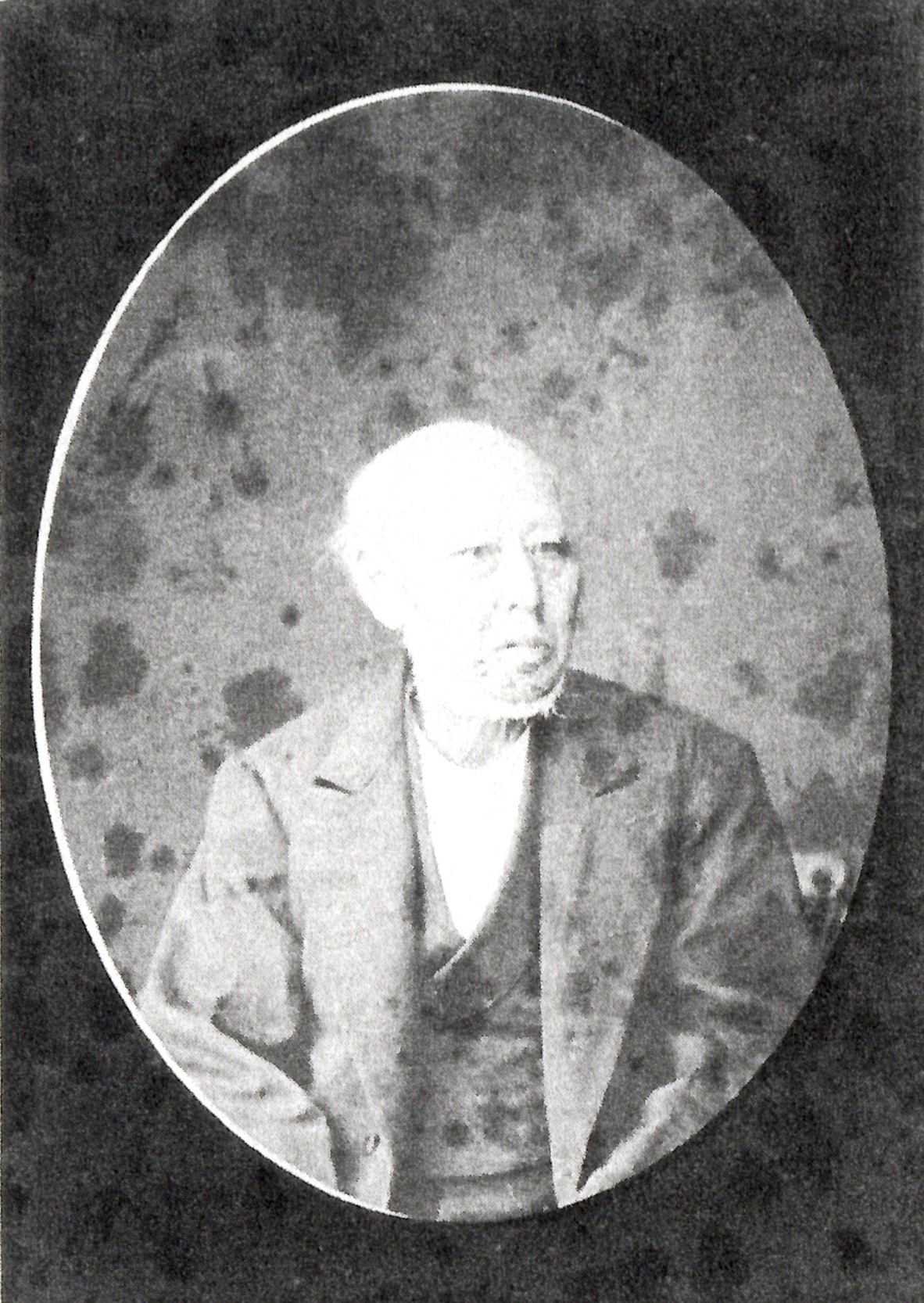
Tani Morimasa, 12th daimyō of Yamaga

Yamaga Domain (山家藩, Yamaga-han) was a feudal domain under the Tokugawa shogunate of Edo period Japan, located in Tanba Province in what is now the west-central portion of modern-day Kyoto Prefecture. It was centered around Yamaga jin'ya in what is now the Hirose neighborhood of the city of Ayabe, Kyoto.

== History ==
The Tani clan was originally from Mino Province and were early retainers of Oda Nobunaga. Tani Moritomo participated in all of the campaigns of Toyotomi Hideyoshi and was rewarded with a 16,000 koku domain in Tanba Province in 1582. During the Battle of Sekigahara, he served in the Western Army, and was ordered by Ishida Mitsunari to attack Tanabe Castle, whose lord, Hosokawa Fujitaka was a personal friend. Tani made a great show of attacking the castle, but famously, all of his soldiers and cannons were firing blank rounds at the castle. For this reason, he received no punishment from the victorious Tokugawa Ieyasu and was confirmed as daimyō of his existing holdings under the Tokugawa shogunate. He went on to serve the Tokugawa at the Siege of Osaka. The clan would continue to rule Yamaga for 13 generations until the Meiji restoration. However, Tani Moritomo's son, Tani Morimasa, distributed 6000 koku of his holdings to his younger brother and two cousins, reducing the domain to the bare minimum requirement to maintain its status. Since the domain was located in a mountainous area with little land suitable for rice cultivation, the domain's finances were supported by forestry and production of washi paper. During the Bakumatsu period, the domain was one of the first to support the new Meiji government. In 1871, with the abolition of the han system, Yamaga briefly became "Yamaga Prefecture", which was merged with Kyoto Prefecture a few months later. The final daimyō, Tani Morishige, became a viscount (shishaku) in the kazoku peerage in 1884.

== Holdings at the end of the Edo period ==
As with most domains in the han system, Yamaga Domain consisted of several discontinuous territories calculated to provide the assigned kokudaka, based on periodic cadastral surveys and projected agricultural yields.

- Tanba Province
  - 44 villages in Ikaruga District

== List of daimyō ==
| # | Name | Tenure | Courtesy title | Court Rank | kokudaka |
|---|---|---|---|---|---|
Tani clan, 1582-1871 (tozama)
| 1 | Tani Moritomo (谷衛友) | 1582 – 1627 | Dewa-no-kami (出羽守) | Junior 5th Rank, Lower Grade (従五位下) | 16,000 koku |
| 2 | Tani Morimasa (谷衛政) | 1628 – 1662 | Daigaku-no-kami (大学頭) | Junior 5th Rank, Lower Grade (従五位下) | 16,000 -> 10,000 koku |
| 3 | Tani Morihiro (谷衛広) | 1663 – 1689 | Dewa-no-kami (出羽守) | Junior 5th Rank, Lower Grade (従五位下) | 10,000 koku |
| 4 | Tani Moriyori (谷衛憑) | 1689 – 1717 | Harima-no-kami (播磨守) | Junior 5th Rank, Lower Grade (従五位下) | 10,000 koku |
| 5 | Tani Morimichi (谷衛衝) | 1717 – 1762 | Dewa-no-kami 出羽守) | Junior 5th Rank, Lower Grade (従五位下) | 10,000 koku |
| 6 | Tani Morimasa (谷衛将1) | 1762 – 1764 | Daigaku-no-kami (大学頭) | Junior 5th Rank, Lower Grade (従五位下) | 10,000 koku |
| 7 | Tani Morihide (谷衛秀) | 1764 – 1780 | Harima-no-kami (播磨守) | Junior 5th Rank, Lower Grade (従五位下) | 10,000 koku |
| 8 | Tani Morikazu (谷衛量) | 1780 – 1801 | Harima-no-kami (播磨守) | Junior 5th Rank, Lower Grade (従五位下) | 10,000 koku |
| 9 | Tani Moritaka (谷衛萬) | 1801 – 1816 | Daigaku-no-kami (大学頭) | Junior 5th Rank, Lower Grade (従五位下) | 10,000 koku |
| 10 | Tani Morimitsu (谷衛弥) | 1816 – 1820 | Ukyo-no-suke (右京亮) | Junior 5th Rank, Lower Grade (従五位下) | 10,000 koku |
| 11 | Tani Moriyasui (谷衛昉) | 1820 – 1845 | Dewa-no-kami 出羽守) | Junior 5th Rank, Lower Grade (従五位下) | 10,000 koku |
| 12 | Tani Morinori (谷衛弼) | 1845 – 1856 | Harima-no-kami 播磨守) | Junior 5th Rank, Lower Grade (従五位下) | 10,000 koku |
| 13 | Tani Morishige (谷衛滋) | 1856 – 1871 | Daizen-no-suke (大膳亮) | Junior 5th Rank, Lower Grade (従五位下) | 10,000 koku |

== See also ==
- List of Han
- Abolition of the han system
