= Hozukyō Station =

Railway station in Kameoka, Kyoto Prefecture, Japan

Hozukyō Station 保津峡駅
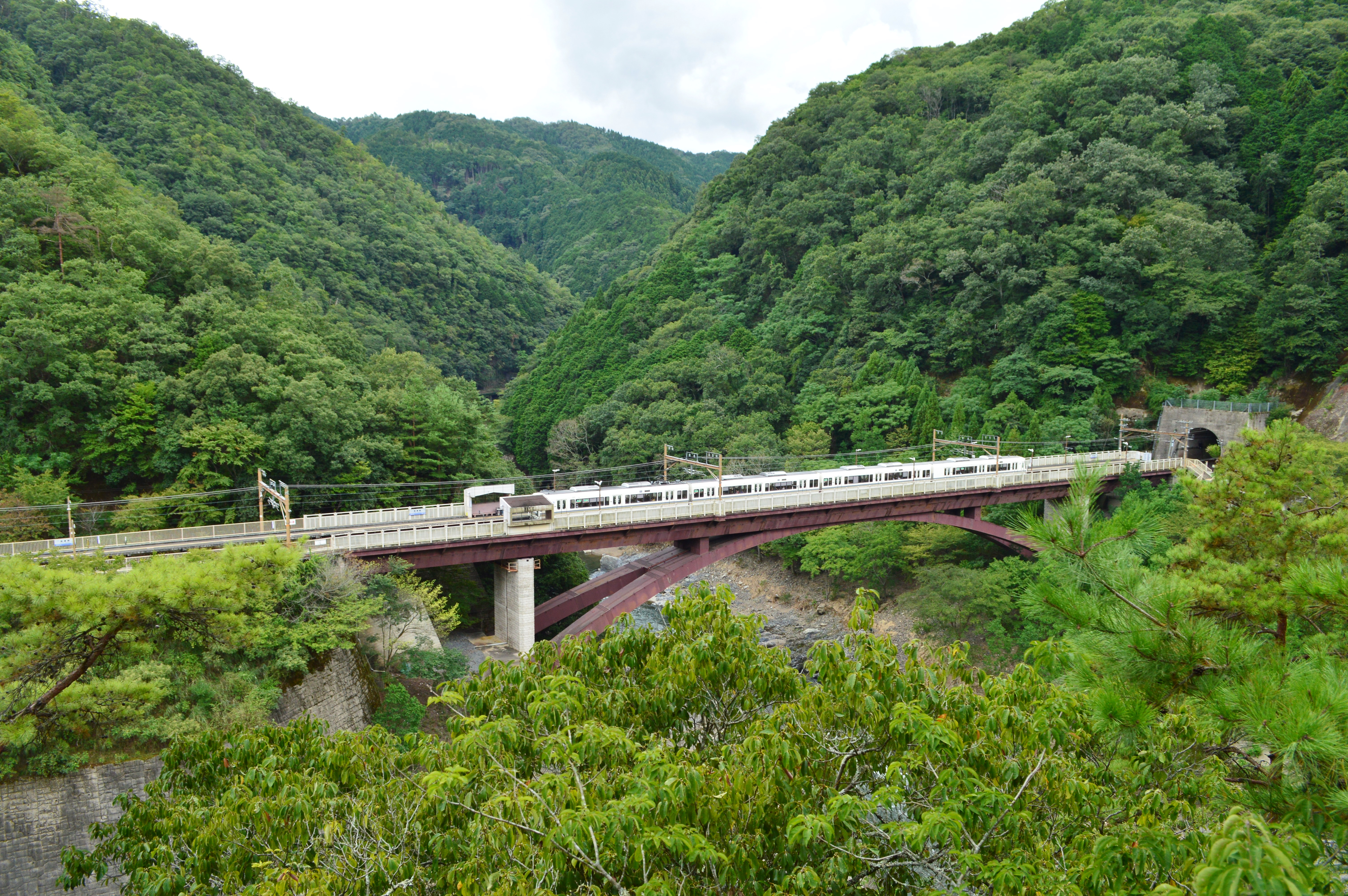
- View of the station from distance, August 2018

General information
- Location: 3-1434 Hozuchō Hozuyama, Kameoka City, Kyoto Prefecture 621-0005; Japan
- Coordinates: 35°1′22.95″N 135°38′25.11″E
- Operator: JR West
- Line: E Sagano Line (San'in Main Line)
- Distance: 14.3 km (8.9 miles) from Kyoto
- Platforms: 2 side platforms
- Tracks: 2
- Connections: Bus stop

Construction
- Structure type: Elevated

Other information
- Status: Unstaffed
- Station code: JR-E09
- Website: Official website

History
- Opened: 15 April 1936; 90 years ago

Passengers
- FY 2023: 344 daily

Services
Preceding station	JR West	Following station
Umahori towards Sonobe	Sagano Line Local	Saga-Arashiyama towards Kyoto
Location
- Location within Kyoto Prefecture Location within Kansai region Location within Japan

Hozukyō Station (保津峡駅, Hozukyō-eki) is a passenger railway station located primarily in the city of Kameoka, Kyoto Prefecture, Japan, operated by West Japan Railway Company (JR West). The platforms lie on a bridge across the eponymous Hozukyō gorge, straddling the border with Nishikyō-ku, Kyoto City.

== Lines ==
Hozukyō Station is served by the San'in Main Line (Sagano Line), and is located 14.3 kilometers from the terminus of the line at Kyoto.

== Station layout ==
The station consists of two opposed elevated side platforms. The station is unattended.

=== Platforms ===
1	■ E Sagano Line (San'in Main Line)	for Kyoto
2	■ E Sagano Line (San'in Main Line)	for Kameoka, Sonobe and Fukuchiyama

== History ==
The station started as Matsuoyama Signal Box (松尾山信号場, Matsuoyama Shingōjō) on 17 August 1929, and was replaced by the passenger station under the current name on 15 April 1936. It was originally located in the site of the present Torokko Hozukyō Station on the Sagano Scenic Railway. With the privatization of the Japan National Railways (JNR) on 1 April 1987, the station came under the aegis of the West Japan Railway Company. The station was moved to the present location on 5 March 1989, when the new route of the Sanin Main Line was opened. The old railway track and the closed station was revived as the Sagano Scenic Railway and its stop on 27 April 1991.

Station numbering was introduced in March 2018 with Hozukyō being assigned station number JR-E09.

== Passenger statistics ==
In fiscal 2019, the station was used by an average of 358 passengers daily.

== Surrounding area ==
- Hozukyō Gorge
- Torokko Hozukyō Station

== Gallery ==
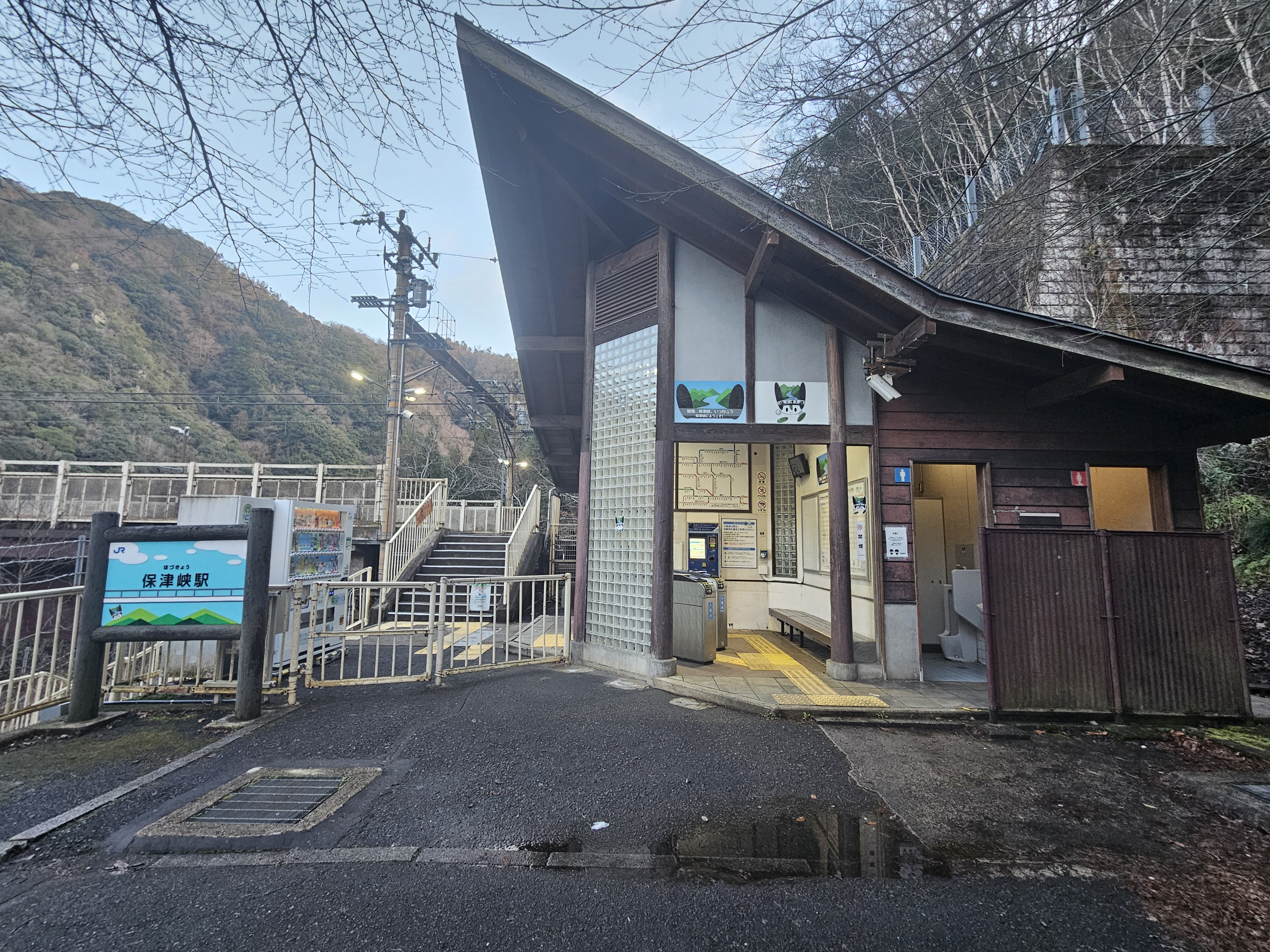
Station building and entrance, March 2025

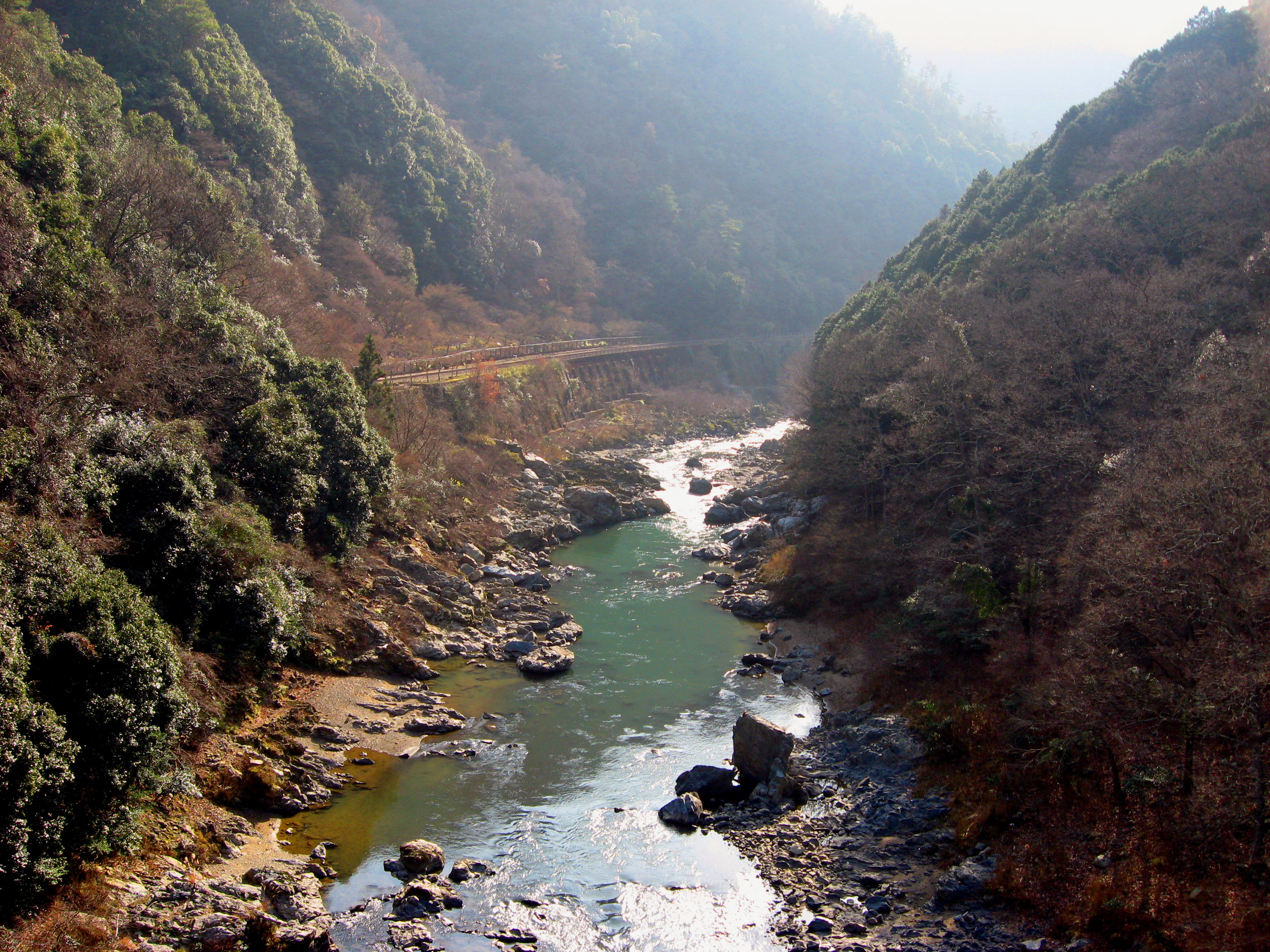
View of the Hozugawa Valley on the south side from Platform 2, January 2008

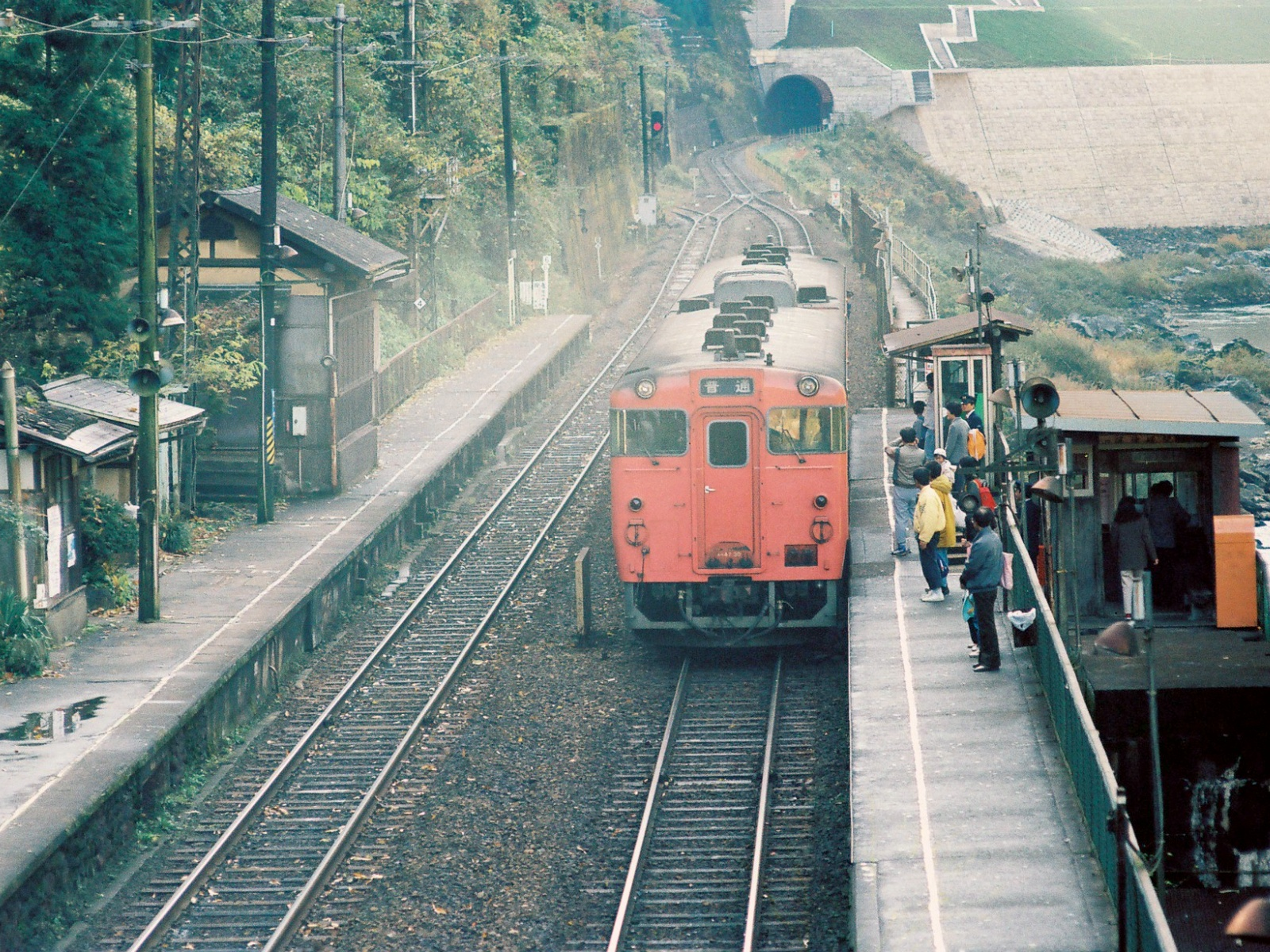
Station on the old line in 1988

== See also ==
- List of railway stations in Japan
