= 2007 Kameoka mayoral election =

Kameoka, Kyoto held a mayoral election on October 21, 2007. Incumbent Masataka Kuriyama won the election.

== Results ==
Mayoral election 2008: Kameoka
Party	Candidate	Votes	%	±%
Independent	Masataka Kuriyama	21,815		
Independent, JCP	Yoshihide Matsuno	7,050		
Turnout		29,228	39.25 %	
