= Kameoka =

Kameoka 亀岡市
- City
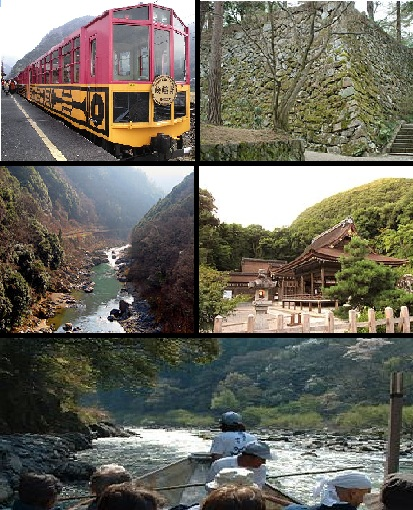
- Top left: A sightseeing train at Sagano Sightseeing Line, Top right: Kameoka Castle site, Middle left: Hozu Valley, Middle right: Kameoka Izumo Shrine, Bottom: A sightseeing boat at Hozu Valley

- Flag Emblem

- Location of Kameoka in Kyoto Prefecture

- Location in Japan
- Coordinates: 35°1′N 135°34′E
- Country: Japan
- Region: Kansai
- Prefecture: Kyoto

Government
  - Mayor: Takahiro Katsuragawa

Area
  - Total: 224.80 km^{2} (86.80 sq mi)

Population (January 1, 2022)
  - Total: 87,518
  - Density: 389.31/km^{2} (1,008.3/sq mi)
- Time zone: UTC+09:00 (JST)
- City hall address: 8 Yasumachi Nonogami, Kameoka-shi, Kyōto-fu 621-8501
- Website: Official website
- Symbols
- Flower: Azalea
- Tree: Sakura

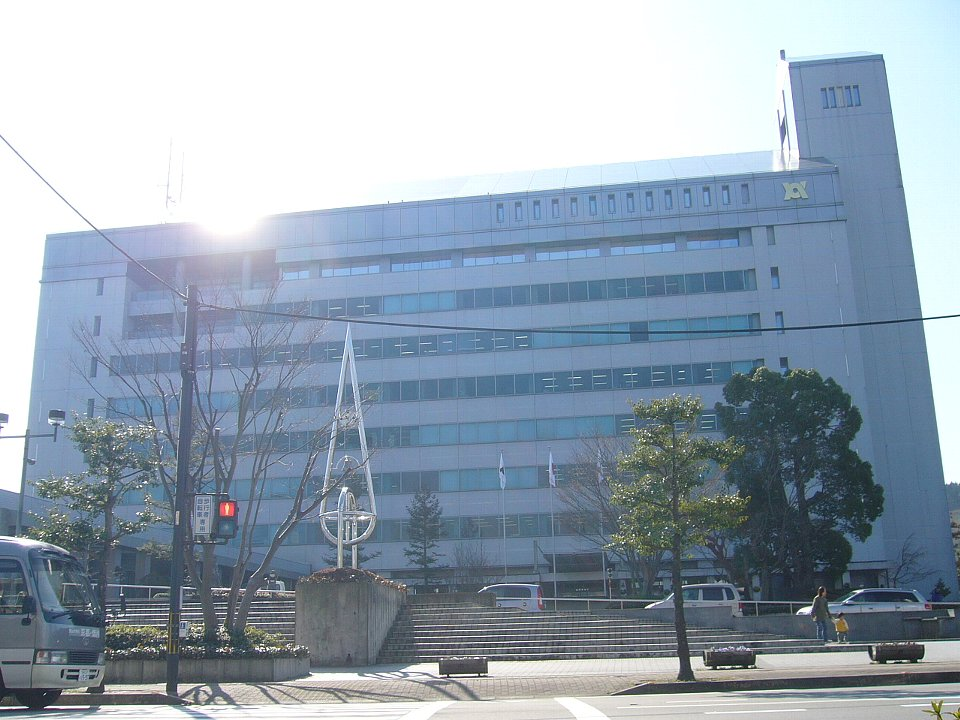
Kameoka City Hall

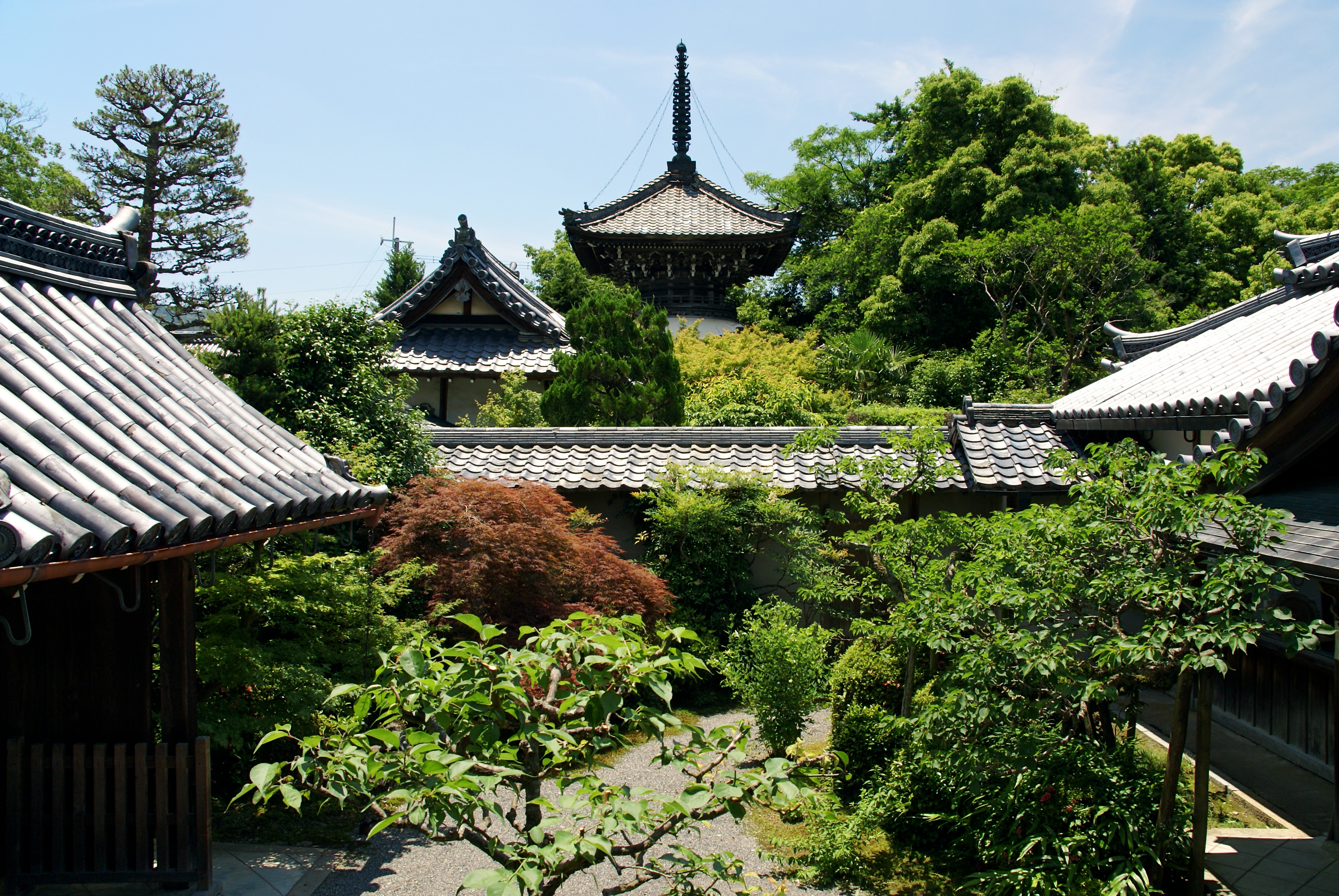
Anaoji in Kameoka

Kameoka (亀岡市, Kameoka-shi) is a city in Kyoto Prefecture, Japan. As of 1 January 2022, the city had an estimated population of 87,518 in 29,676 households and a population density of 390 persons per km^{2}. The total area of the city is 224.80 square kilometres (86.80 sq mi).

== Geography ==
Kameoka abuts Kyoto to the west and is located to the north of Osaka. It is on the border line between former Tanba and Yamashiro Provinces. Together with Nantan city, the region is known as Southern Tanba, Kuchitan or Nanatan. For centuries, Kameoka served as a key transportation point to connect San'in region and Tanba providence with Kyoto. Today, the city serves as one of the suburbs of Metro Kyoto.

Kameoka is notable as the launch point for Hozugawa Kudari, a boat ride down the Hozu River. It is also the location of Anaoji Temple, one of the 21 temples in western Japan authorized to issue amulets in the name of the Boddhisattva Kannon.

=== Neighbouring municipalities ===
Kyoto Prefecture

- Kyoto
- Nantan

Osaka Prefecture

- Ibaraki
- Nose
- Takatsuki
- Toyono

=== Climate ===
Kameoka has a humid subtropical climate (Köppen Cfa) characterized by warm summers and cool winters with light to no snowfall. The average annual temperature in Kameoka is 13.5 °C. The average annual rainfall is 1690 mm with September as the wettest month. The temperatures are highest on average in August, at around 25.4 °C, and lowest in January, at around 2.1 °C.

== Demographics ==
Per Japanese census data, the population of Kameoka peaked around the year 2000 and has declined slightly since.

Historical population
Year	Pop.	±%
1960	42,355	—
1970	47,151	+11.3%
1980	69,410	+47.2%
1990	85,283	+22.9%
2000	94,555	+10.9%
2010	92,416	−2.3%
2020	86,174	−6.8%

== History ==
Kameoka was part of ancient Tanba Province. Rice cultivation was introduced in the Yayoi period, and the area's many large kofun burial mounds, especially on the left bank of the Oigawa River (Hozu River). According to the Nihon Shoki, at the beginning of the 6th century, the area was the center of a succession struggle within the imperial court, in which King Yahiko, who was in the direct line of succession was defeated by Emperor Keitai from Echizen Province. The area was the location of the ichinomiya of the province, Izumo-daijingū and the Tanba Kokubun-ji. The Tanba provincial capital was located nearby, but its exact location has yet to be determined. The area around Kameoka developed as transportation hub as it was the entrance to Kyoto from the San'in region. In 1333, Takauji Ashikaga raised his army in Kameoka to settle the Genkō Rebellion in Kyoto. In the Sengoku period, Akechi Mitsuhide constructed Kameyama Castle and laid out the castle town which became the core of modern Kameyama. During the Edo period, it was the center of Tanba-Kameyama Domain, which was controlled by a succession of fudai daimyo clans. Kameyama was renamed Kameoka in 1869 to avoid confusion with Kameyama, Mie. The town of Kameyama was established with the creation of the modern municipalities system on April 1, 1889. On January 1, 1955, Kameoka merged with 15 neighboring villages all within Minami-Kuwada District, and was raised to city status.

== Government ==
Kameoka has a mayor-council form of government with a directly elected mayor and a unicameral town council of 24 members. Kameoka contributes two members to the Kyoto Prefectural Assembly. In terms of national politics, the city is part of Kyoto 4th district of the lower house of the Diet of Japan.

== Economy ==
Historically, the area served as a farming community for Kyoto, Japan's former capital. For centuries, area farmers provided ingredients used for traditional Japanese food served in Kyoto including chestnuts, black beans, azuki, rice, matsutake, yams, and daikon. In addition, farmers in the city provide beef, chicken and ayu (also known as sweetfish). At present, the area is a mix of agriculture, light manufacturing and is increasingly a commuter town for Kyoto.

== Education ==
- Kyoto Gakuen University

=== Primary and secondary schools ===
Kameoka has 17 public elementary schools and seven public middle schools operated by the city government and two public high schools operated by the Kyoto Prefectural Department of Education.

== Transportation ==
=== Railway ===
JR West – San'in Main Line / Sagano Line

- Hozukyō - Umahori - Kameoka - Namikawa - Chiyokawa

=== Highway ===
- Kyoto Jūkan Expressway
- National Route 9
- National Route 372
- National Route 423
- National Route 477
- National Route 478

== Sister cities ==
Kameoka has agreements of friendship and co-operation with:

- Knittelfeld, Austria, since April 14, 1964
- Stillwater, Oklahoma, United States, since November 3, 1985
- Jandira, Brazil, since November 3, 1980
- Suzhou, China, since December 31, 1996

== Local attractions ==
- Anao-ji temple, 21st on the Saigoku Kannon Pilgrimage
- Chitose Kurumazuka Kofun, National Historic Site
- Izumo-daijingū Shinto shrine
- Kameyama Castle ruins
- Tanba Kokubun-ji ruins, National Historic Site
- Mount Takakuma (高熊山) (357 metres), located in Anao (穴太), is one of the most sacred mountains in the Oomoto religion. The religion's co-founder, Onisaburo Deguchi, performed spiritual training on this mountain in 1898.
- Ten'on-kyō (天恩郷), the administrative headquarters of the Oomoto religion

== Sports ==
- Kyoto Stadium – home of Kyoto Sanga FC, a professional football club

== Notable people from Kameoka ==
- Aya Domenig (born 1972)
- Maruyama Ōkyo (1733–1795)
- Onisaburo Deguchi (1871–1948), founder of the Oomoto religion

== See also ==
- 2007 Kameoka mayoral election
