= Sonobe Domain =

Japanese feudal domain located in Tanba Province

Sonobe Domain 園部藩
- under Tokugawa shogunate Japan
- 1619–1871
- Capital: Sonobe jin'ya / Sonobe Castle
- Area
  - Coordinates: 35°6′18.35″N 135°28′10.26″E
  - Type: Daimyō
- Historical era: Edo period
  - Established: 1619
  - Disestablished: 1871
- Today part of: part of Kyoto Prefecture

Location of Sonobe Castle
Sonobe Domain (Japan)

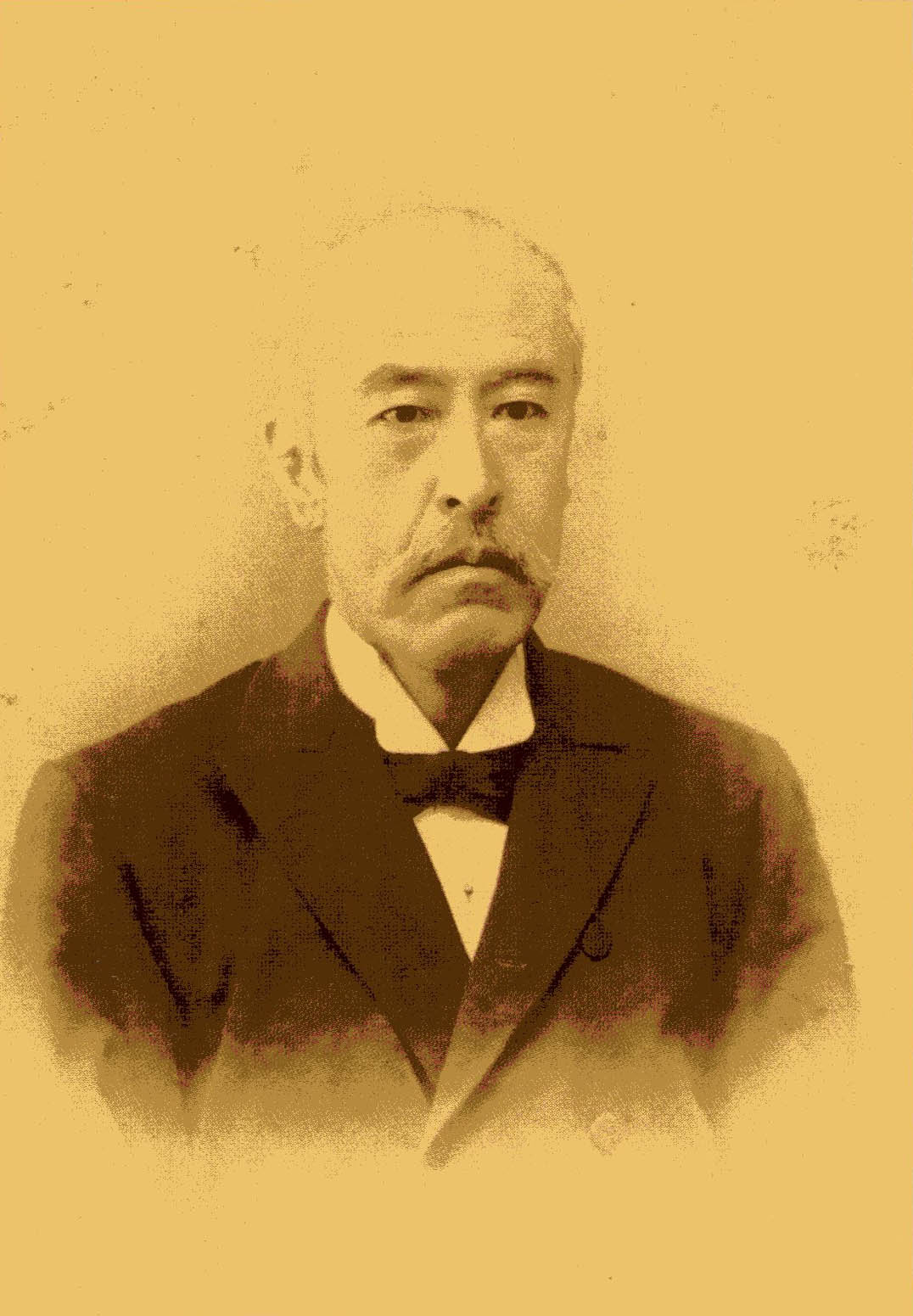
Koide Fusanao, final daimyō of Sonobe Domain

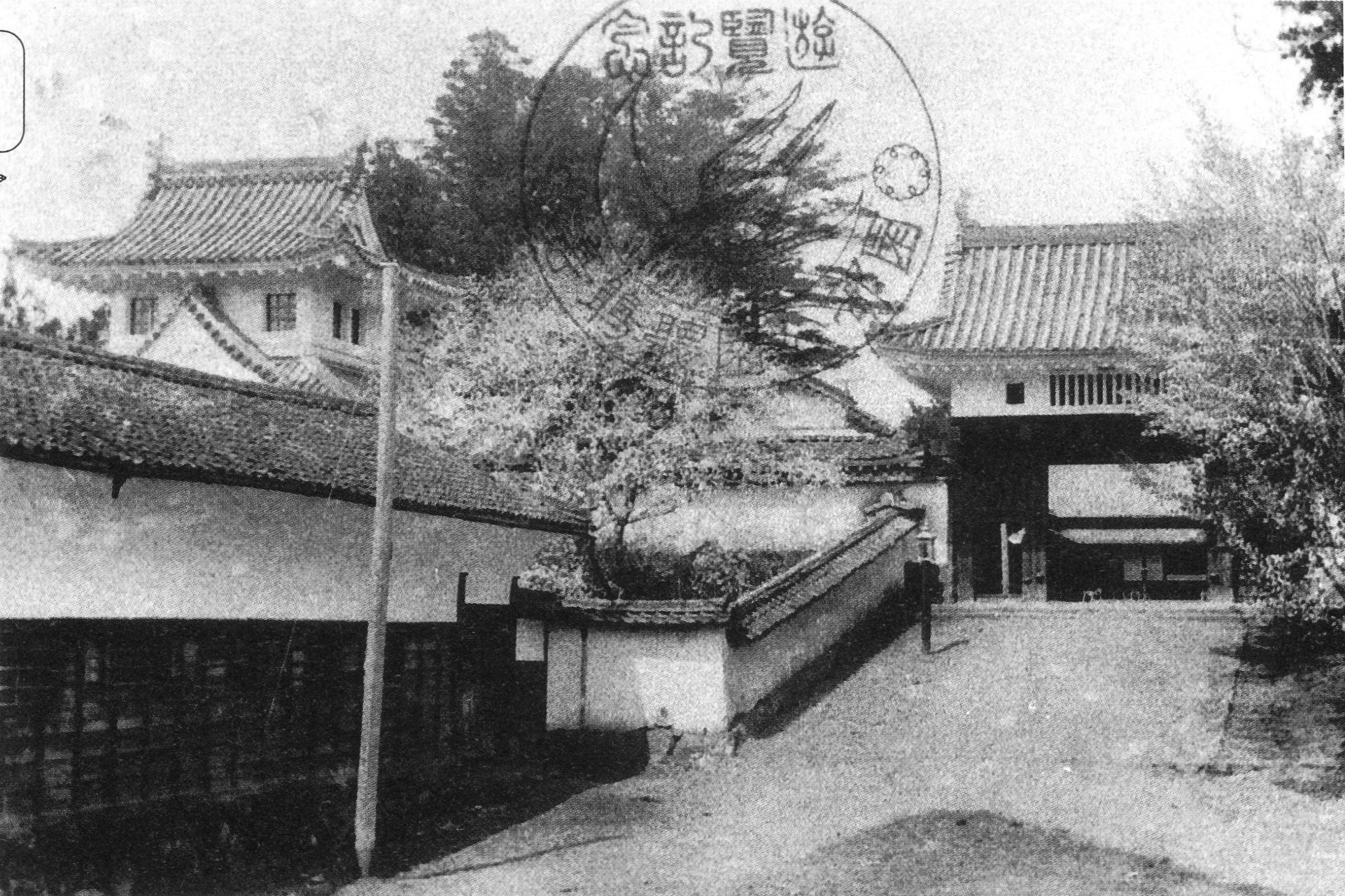
Sonobe Castle

Sonobe Domain (園部藩, Sonobe-han) was a feudal domain under the Tokugawa shogunate of Edo period Japan, located in Tanba Province in what is now the central portion of modern-day Kyoto Prefecture. It was centered around Sonobe jin'ya, which was located in the Sonobe neighborhood of what is now the city of Nantan, Kyoto.

== History ==
In 1619, Koide Yoshichika, the 3rd daimyō of Izushi Domain returned the domain to his elder brother (who had been daimyō of Kishiwada Domain, and was given the newly created fief of Sonobe, with a kokudaka of 29,800 koku. He built Sonobe jin'ya, the castle town and completed various irrigation and land improvement works. On his retirement, he took 5000 koku of the domain, reducing its kokudaka to 25,000 koku (as 500 koku had been added through the opening of new rice fields). On his death, this 5000 koku portion was divided between the two younger brothers of the 2nd daimyō, Koide Fusatomo. The 4th daimyō, Koide Fusasada, served as Jisha-bugyō and wakadoshiyori in the shogunal administration, notwithstanding his clan's status as a tozama daimyō. He also reduced the domain to 24,000 koku by ranting 1000 koku to his younger brother. The 5th daimyō, Koide Fusayoshi, also served as jisha-bugyō and wakadoshiyori. However, during the tenure of the 7th daimyō, Koide Fusatake, the domain suffered from repeated natural disaster, including flooding, crop failure and famine, which ruined the clan's financial resources. The increase in price and taxes led to a widespread revolt in 1787, which was worsened by a fire which destroyed most of the town. The domain implemented a monopoly system on tobacco and lumber, which helped alleviate its financial problems. During the Bakumatsu period, under its final daimyō, Koide Fusanao, the domain was one of the first to side with the imperial cause. As such, it was selected by the Meiji government to be a place of refuge for Emperor Meiji in the event that Kyoto be attacked during the Boshin War, and the domain was authorized to reconstruct its jin'ya into a Japanese castle, the last to be built. Following the Meiji restoration he was made viscount (shishaku) in the kazoku peerage. In 1871, with the abolition of the han system, Sonobe Domain became "Sonobe Prefecture". and subsequently became part of Kyoto Prefecture.

== Holdings at the end of the Edo period ==
Most domains in the han system, which consisted of several discontinuous territories calculated to provide the assigned kokudaka, based on periodic cadastral surveys and projected agricultural yields.

- Tanba Province
  - 52 villages in Kuwada District
  - 125 villages in Funai District
  - 9 villages in Ikaruga District

== List of daimyō ==
#	Name	Tenure	Courtesy title	Court Rank	kokudaka
Koide clan, 1619 - 1871 (Tozama)
1	Koide Yoshichika (小出吉親)	1619 - 1667	Ise-no-kami (伊勢守)	Junior 5th Rank, Lower Grade (従五位下)	29,500 koku
2	Koide Fusatomo (小出英知)	1667 - 1673	Shinano-no-kami (信濃守)	Junior 5th Rank, Lower Grade (従五位下)	25,000 koku
3	Koide Fusatoshi (小出英利)	1673 - 1705	Ise-no-kami (伊勢守)	Junior 5th Rank, Lower Grade (従五位下)	25,000 koku
4	Koide Fusasada (小出英貞)	1705 - 1744	Shinano-no-kami (信濃守)	Junior 5th Rank, Lower Grade (従五位下)	25,000 ->24,000 koku
5	Koide Fusayoshi (小出英持)	1744 - 1767	Shinano-no-kami (信濃守)	Junior 5th Rank, Lower Grade (従五位下)	24,000 koku
6	Koide Fusatsune (小出英常)	1767 - 1775	Ise-no-kami (伊勢守)	Junior 5th Rank, Lower Grade (従五位下)	24,000 koku
7	Koide Fusatake (小出英筠)	1775 - 1821	Ise-no-kami (伊勢守)	Junior 5th Rank, Lower Grade (従五位下)	24,000 koku
8	Koide Fusaoki (小出英発)	1821 - 1843	Yamato-no-kami (大和守)	Junior 5th Rank, Lower Grade (従五位下)	24,000 koku
9	Koide Fusanori (小出英教)	1843 - 18561	Shinano-no-kami (信濃守)	Junior 5th Rank, Lower Grade (従五位下)	24,000 koku
10	Koide Fusanao (小出英尚)	1856 - 1871	Ise-no-kami (伊勢守)	Junior 5th Rank, Upper Grade (従五位上)	24,000 koku

== See also ==
- List of Han
- Abolition of the han system
