= Tanba Province =

Former province of Japan

Coordinates: 35°13′42″N 135°20′58″E

Map of Japanese provinces (1868) with Tanba Province highlighted

Tanba Province (丹波国, Tanba no Kuni; Japanese pronunciation: [tä́m̀.bä̀ (nò̞ kɯ̈̀.ɲ̟ì)]) was a province of Japan in the area of central Kyoto and east-central Hyōgo Prefectures. Tanba bordered on Harima, Ōmi, Settsu, Tajima. Tango, Wakasa, and Yamashiro provinces. Its abbreviated form name was Tanshū (丹州). In terms of the Gokishichidō system, Tanba was one of the provinces of the San'indō circuit. Under the Engishiki classification system, Tanba was ranked as one of the "superior countries" (上国) in terms of importance, and one of the "near countries" (近国) in terms of distance from the capital. The provincial capital is believed to have been located in what is now the city of Kameoka, although the exact location remains uncertain. The ichinomiya of the province is the Izumo-daijingū also located in Kameoka. The province had an area of 1,283.43 square kilometres (495.54 sq mi).

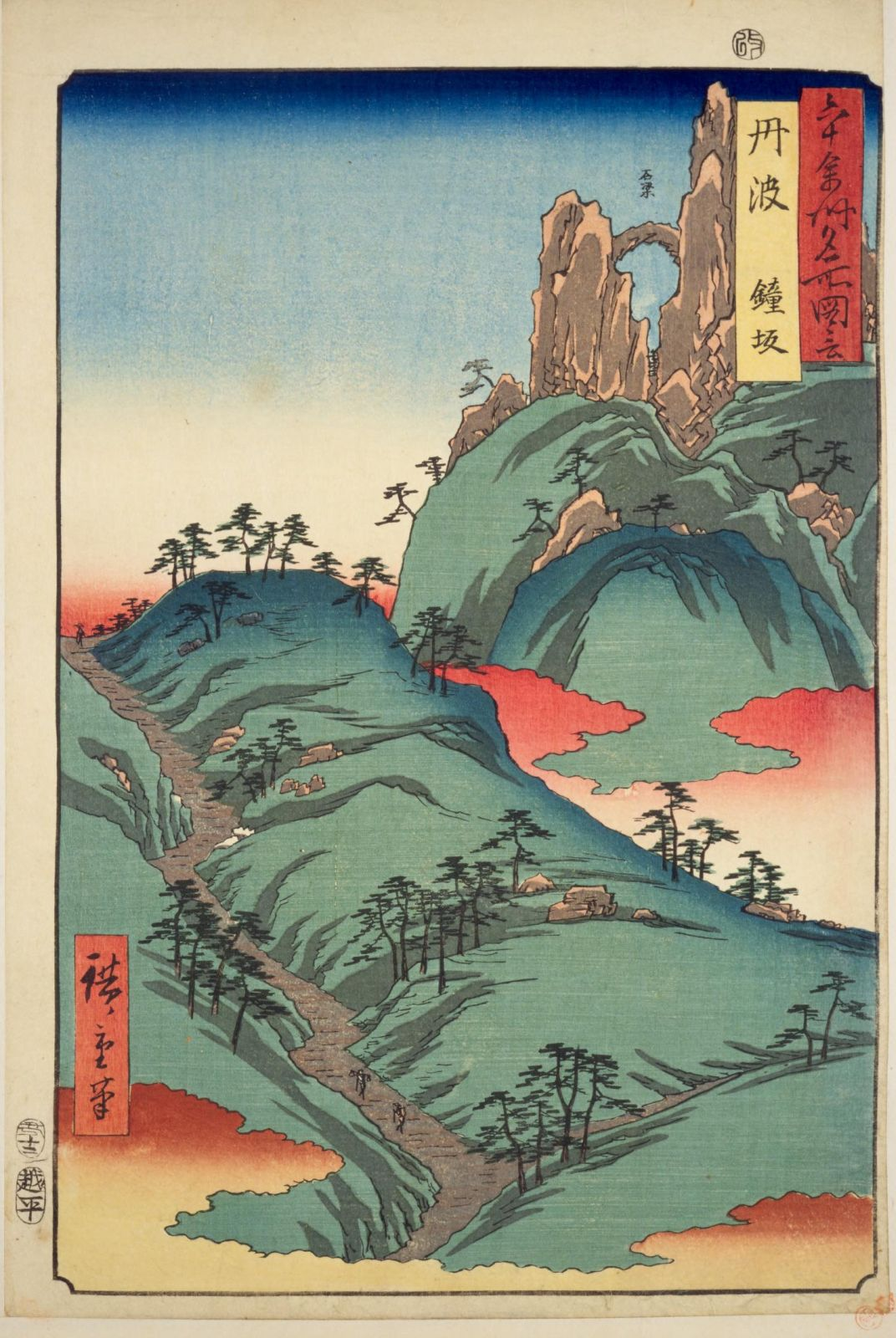
Hiroshige ukiyo-e "Tanba" in "The Famous Scenes of the Sixty States" (六十余州名所図会), depicting the Kanegasaka Pass

== History ==
Before the establishment of the Ritsuryō system, the area was under control of the Tanba Kokuzō and included both the Tanba and Tango areas. The province of Tango was created in 713 during the reign of Empress Genmei by separating the northern five districts (Kasa District, Yoza District, Tamba District (later Naka District), Takeno District, and Kumano District) into "Tango", and the districts closer to the capital as "Tanba". The Tanba area is rugged, and can be roughly divided into several river basins separated by mountains. For this reason, historically the province has been difficult to govern as a whole. On the other hand, its proximity to the capital gave it a strategic importance. In 1131 the Tamba Province was give to Taira no Tadamori by the Emporor. It was previously unaproppriated. During the Muromachi period, the Hosokawa clan were the shugo of the province, but governed through their proxies, the Naito clan. During the late Sengoku period, the province was conquered by Akechi Mitsuhide, and after his defeat by Toyotomi Hideyoshi at the Battle of Yamasaki in the aftermath of the assassination of Oda Nobunaga, it was governed by a succession of relatives of the Toyotomi clan. In the Edo Period, Tanba was governed by a mosaic of mostly fudai daimyō domains, who were considered more reliable by the Tokugawa shogunate and who could be called upon when necessary for the defense of Kyoto and Osaka.

Bakumatsu period domains
Name	Clan	Type	kokudaka
Sasayama	Aoyama clan	Fudai	60,000 koku
Tanba-Kameyama	Katanobara-Matsudaira clan	Fudai	50,000 koku
Kaibara	Oda clan	Tozama	36,000 koku
Fukuchiyama	Kutsuki clan	Fudai	32,000 koku
Sonobe	Koide clan	Fudai	24,000 koku
Ayabe	Kuki clan	Tozama	19,500 koku
Yamaga	Tani clan	Tozama	10.000 koku

== Meiji period ==
Following the Meiji restoration, Tanba was divided into six districts. Per the early Meiji period Kyudaka kyuryo Torishirabe-chō (旧高旧領取調帳), an official government assessment of the nation’s resources, the province had 970 villages with a total kokudaka of 331,954 koku.

Districts of Tango Province
District	kokudaka	Controlled by	at present	Currently
Kuwata (熊野郡)	56,227 koku	218 villages: Tenryō, Imperial family, Kuge, Tanba-Kameyama, Sonobe, Sasayama, Takatsuki		most of Kameoka, parts of Nantan, Kyoto, Takatsuki and Toyono
Funai (船井郡)	52,140 koku	210 villages: Tenryō, Imperial Family, Sonobe, Tanba-Kameyama, Sasayama, Ayabe Tsurumaki		part of Nantan and Kameoka
Ikaruga (何鹿郡)	49,525 koku	136 villages: Tenryō, Ayabe, Yamake, Sonobe, Kaibara, Sasayama, Yunagaya, Okabe	dissolved	Fukuchiyama, small part of Ayabe
Amata (天田郡)	52,059 koku	119 villages: Tenryō, Fukuchiyama, Ayabe, Iino, Tsurumaki, Kaibara, Sasayama, Okabe	dissolved	Fukuchiyama
Hikami (氷上郡)	68,546 koku	172 villages: Tenryō, Kuge, Kaibara, Tanba-Kameyama, Yunagaya, Tsurumaki, Sanda, Yamakami	dissolved	Tanba
Taki (多紀郡)	53,453 koku	115 villages: Sasayama	dissolved	Tamba-Sayayama, Hyogo

== Gallery ==
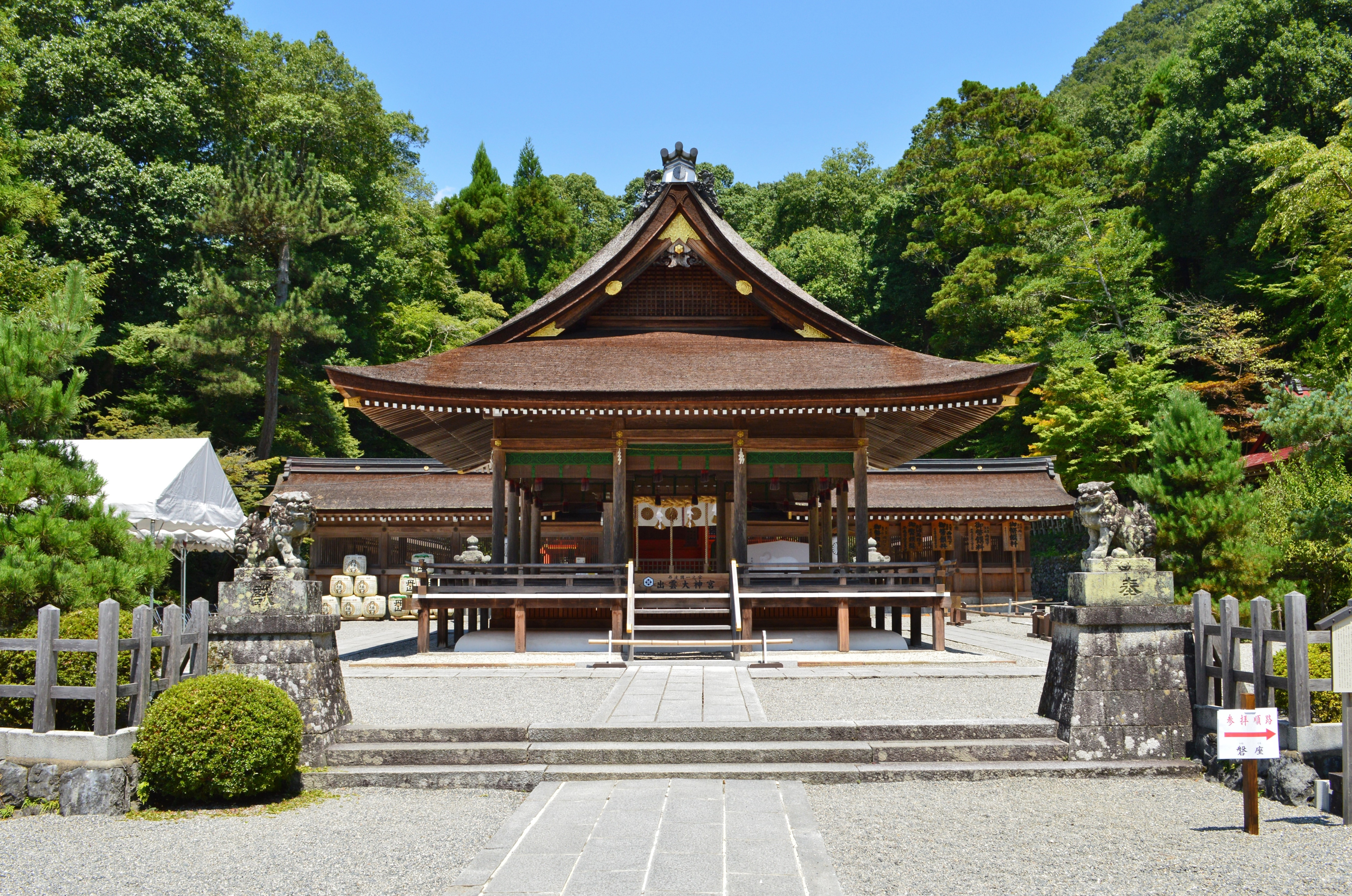
Izumo-daijingū, ichinomiya of the province

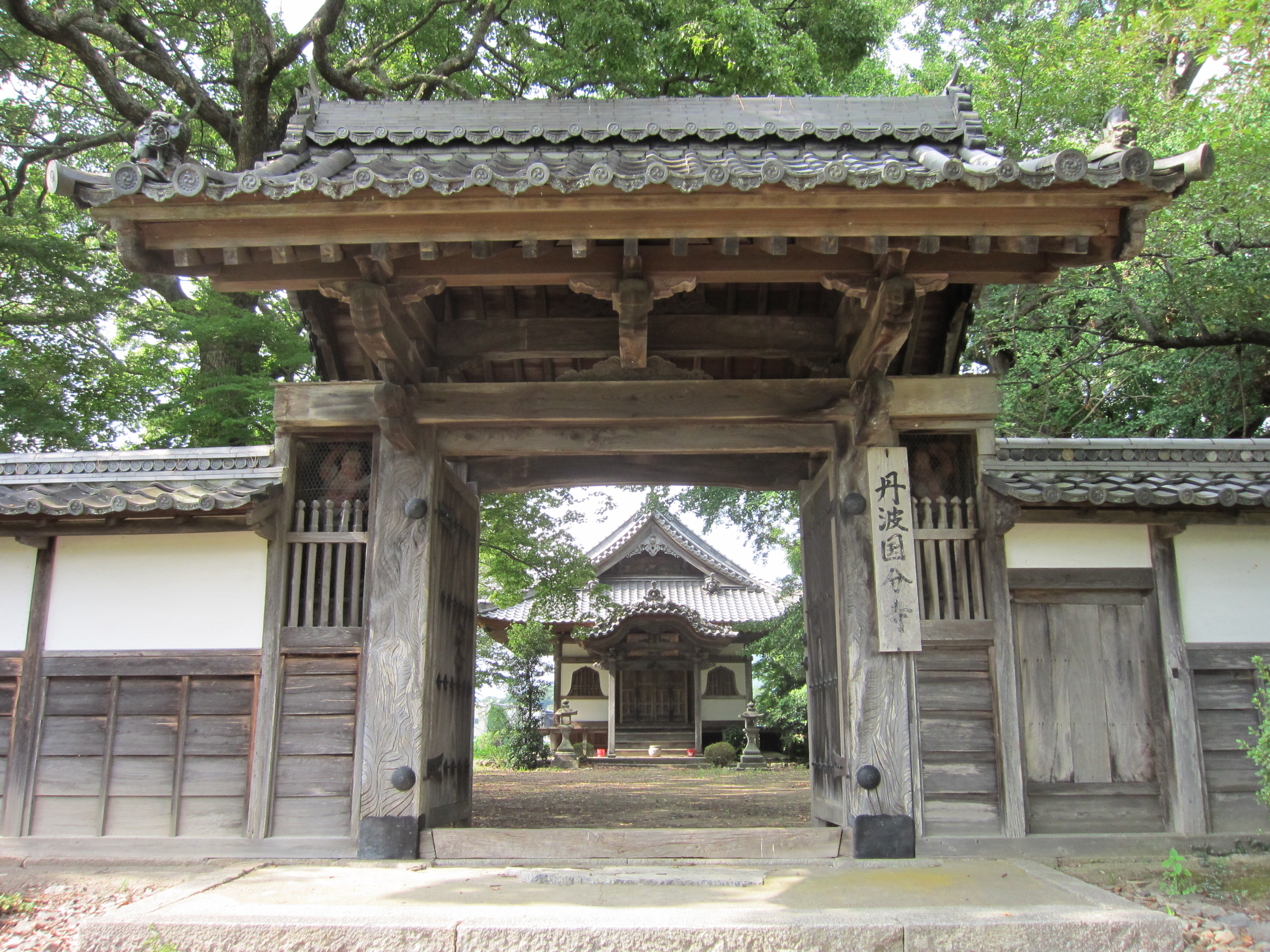
Ruins of Tanba Kokubun-ji

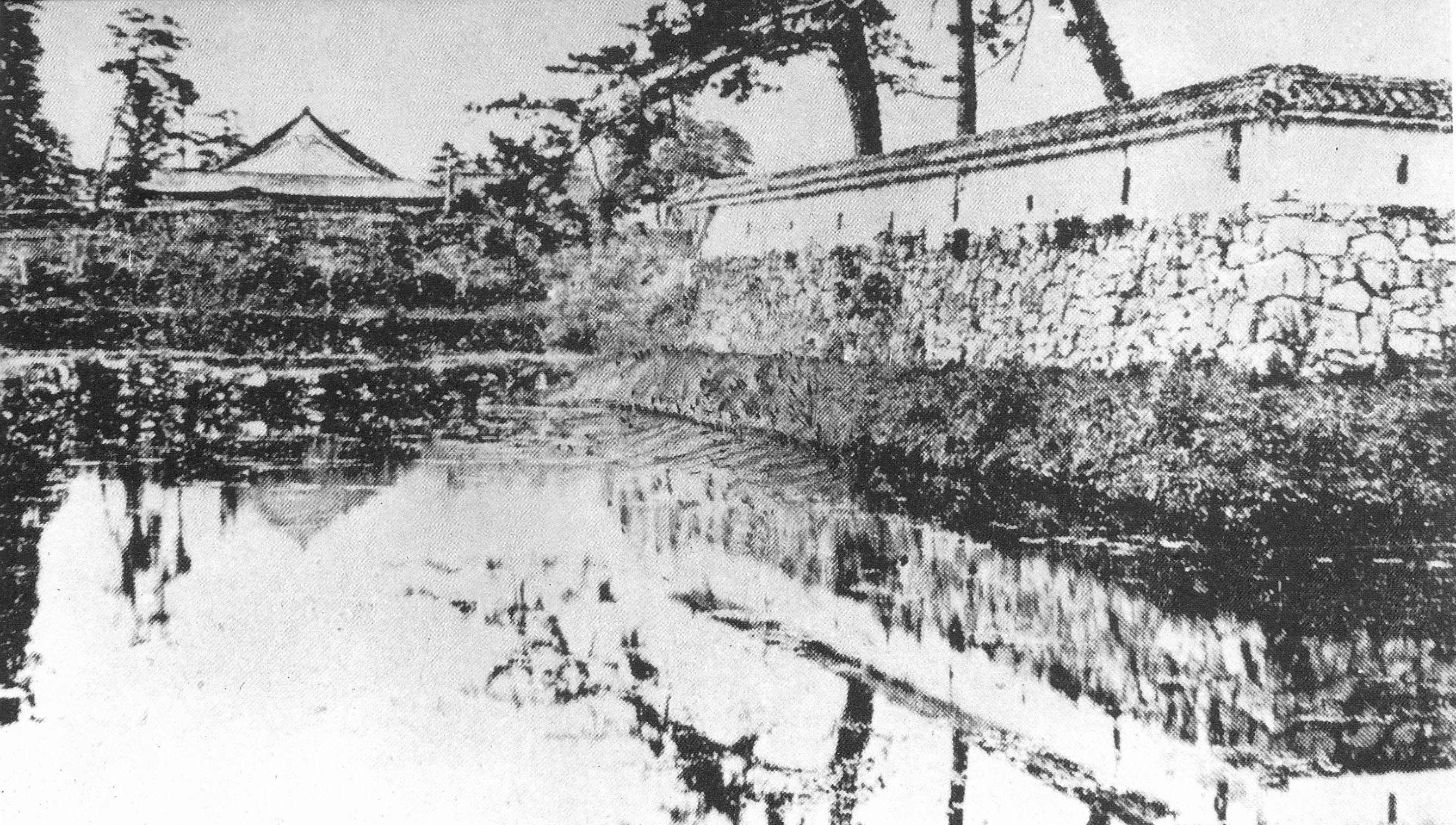
Sasayama Castle

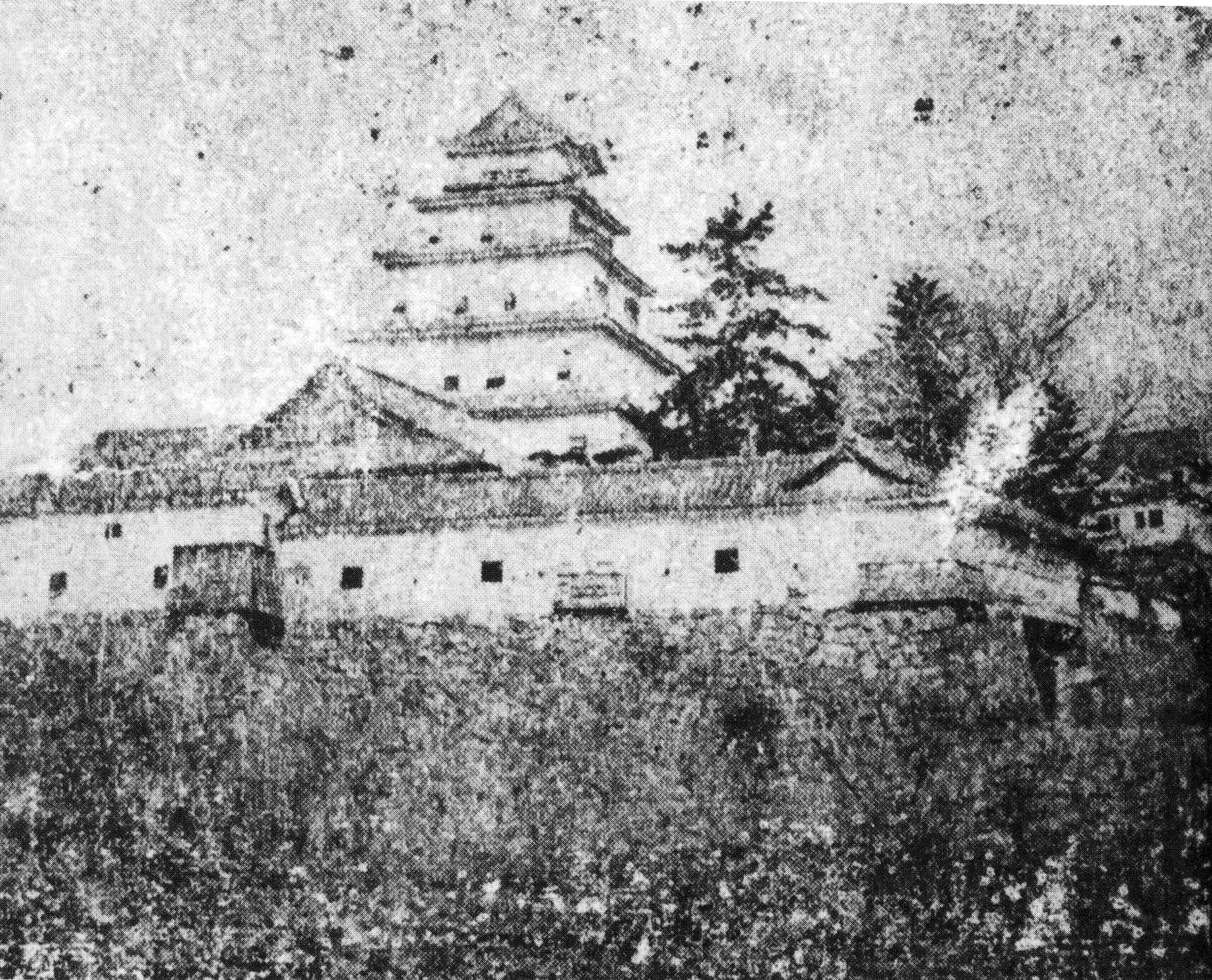
Kameyama Castle
