= Izumo-daijingū =

Building in Kameoka, Kyoto Prefecture, Japan

Izumo Daijingū 出雲大神宮
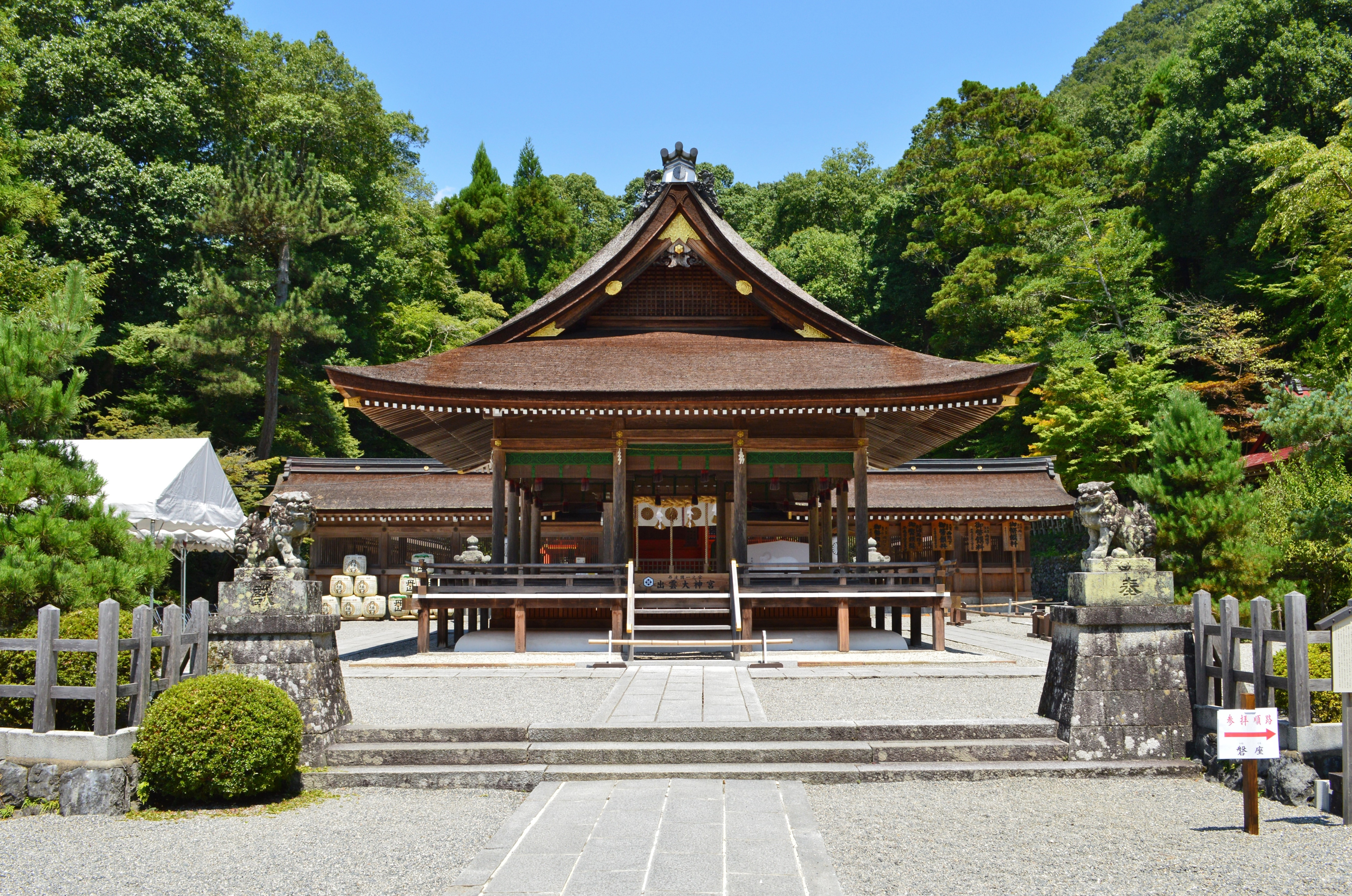
- Haiden of Izumo Daijingū

- Location within Kyoto Prefecture Location within Japan

Religion
- Affiliation: Shinto
- Deity: Ōkuninushi; Mihotsu-hime no Mikoto
- Festival: October 21

Location
- Location: Mubabanchi Chitose Izumo, Chitose-cho, Kameoka-shi, Kyoto-fu 621-0002
- Interactive map of Izumo Daijingū 出雲大神宮
- Coordinates: 35°3′33.86″N 135°34′42.28″E

Website
- Official website

Izumo Daijingū (出雲大神宮) is a Shinto shrine in the Chitose neighborhood of the city of Kameoka in Kyoto Prefecture, Japan. It is the ichinomiya of former Tanba Province. The main festival of the shrine is held annually on the October 21.

== Enshrined kami ==
The primary kami enshrined at Izumo Daijingū are:

- Ōkuninushi (大国主神)
- Mihotsu-hime no Mikoto (三穂津姫尊), wife of Ōkuninushi

The secondary kami are:

- Amatsuhikone (天津彦根命), third son of Amaterasu
- Takehiratori no Mikoto (建比良鳥命), wife of Ōkuninushi

== History ==
The shrine is located at the foot of Mt. Mikage in the eastern part of the Kameoka Basin, which has been worshipped as a sacred mountain since ancient times. The origins of Izumo daijingū are unknown. Geographically, the area is in between the two ancient powers of Izumo and Yamato, and the Chitose Kurumazuka Kofun to the southwest of the shrine is the largest keyhole-shape burial mound in the Tanba region. According to the Tanba-koku Fudoki, in 709 (during the reign of Empress Genmei), a bunrei of the kami Ōkuninushi was transferred from this shrine to "the land of Kitsuki". For this reason, this shrine is also referred to as the Moto-Izumo (元出雲) ("original Izumo"). The far more famous Izumo Taisha was called "Kizuki Shrine" until the Meiji period, so until the end of the Edo period, the "God of Izumo" referred to Izumo Daijingū. The shrine and its rituals are described in both the Kojiki and the Nihon Shoki. The shrine is mentioned in the "Nihon Kiryaku" and Engishiki records from the early Heian period, and was regarded as the ichinomiya of the province from this time. In 1292, its ranking rose to the highest rank due to success of prayers for rain at this shrine. The "Izumo Shrine" mentioned by Yoshida Kenko in the Kamakura period Tsurezuregusa (Chapter 236) refers to this shrine. The shrine was extensively reconstructed by Ashikaga Takauji in 1345. During the Meiji period era of State Shinto, the shrine was rated as a National shrine, 2nd rank (国幣中社, kokuhei-chūsha) under the Modern system of ranked Shinto Shrines.

The shrine is located a 10-minute walk from either Kameoka Station of Chiyokawa Station.

== Cultural Properties ==
=== National Important Cultural Properties ===
- Honden, early Muromachi period, said to have been renovated by Ashikaga Takauji in 1345. It is a Sangensha style building with a cypress bark shingled roof.
- Wooden Statues of male kami, Heian period, set of two. These are seated statues carved from kaya wood, and date from the 9th or 10th century; one possibly depicts Ōkuninushi, the other is of an unknown kami.

== Gallery ==
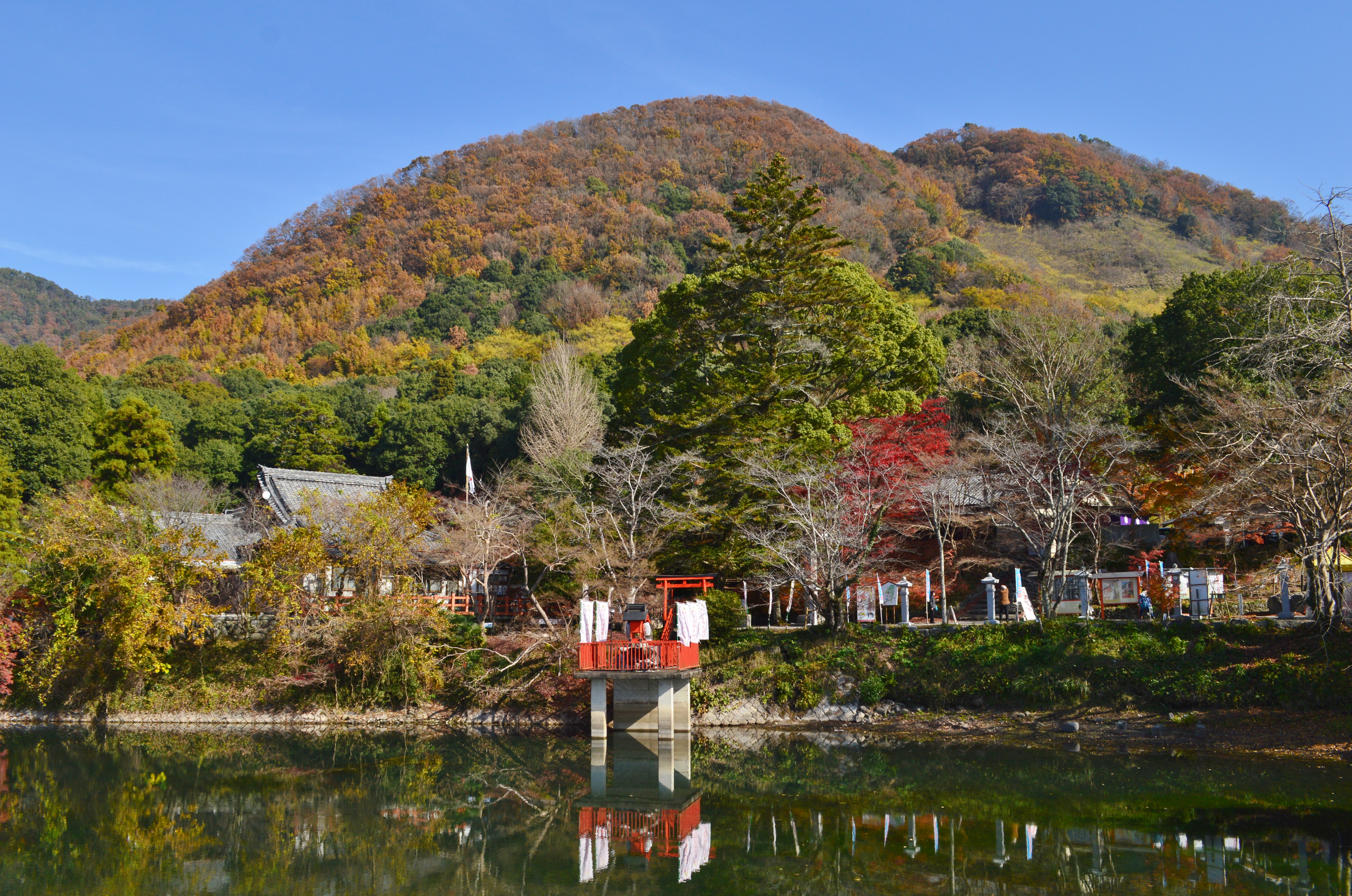
Mount Mikage

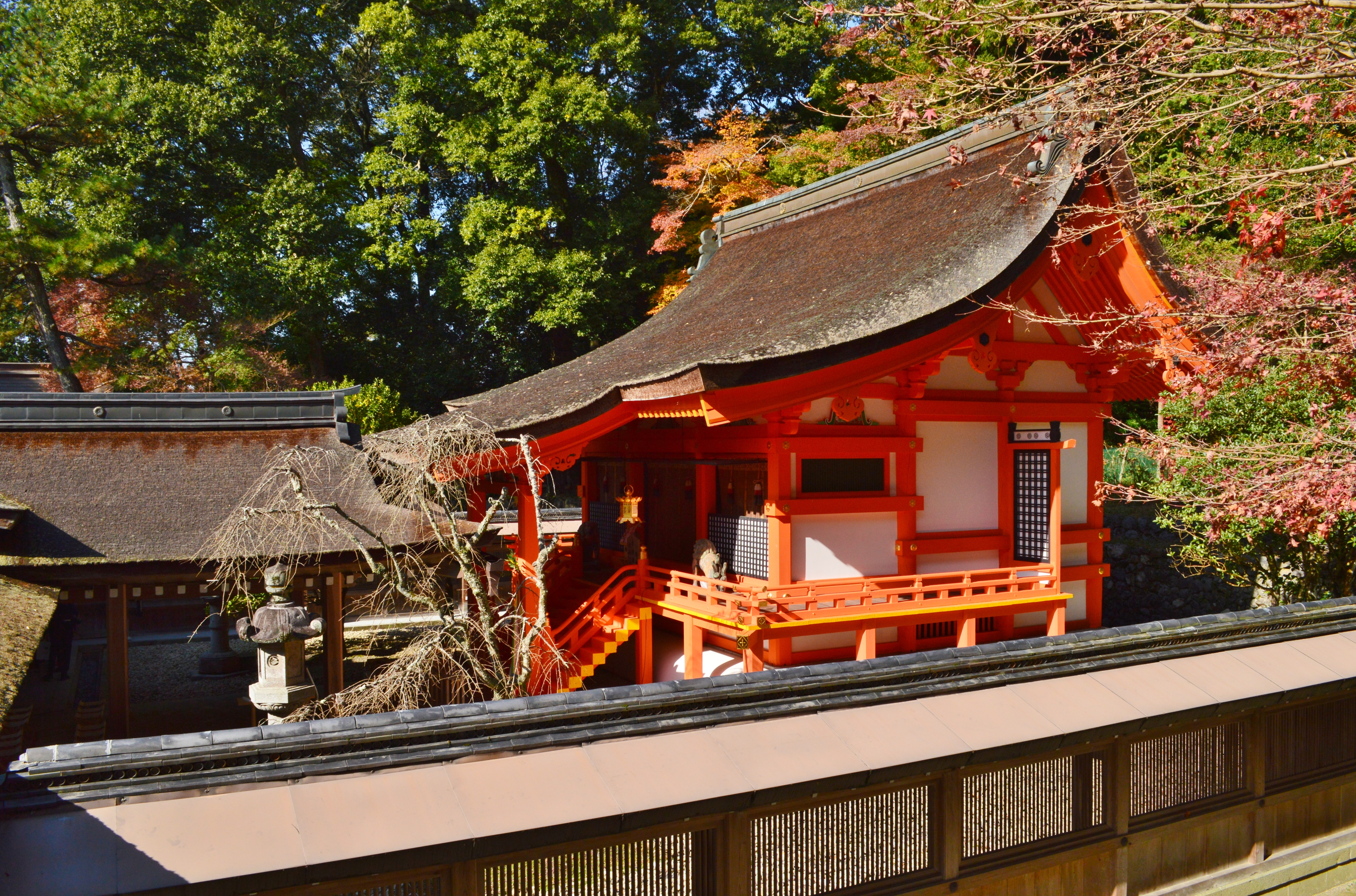
Honden (ICP)

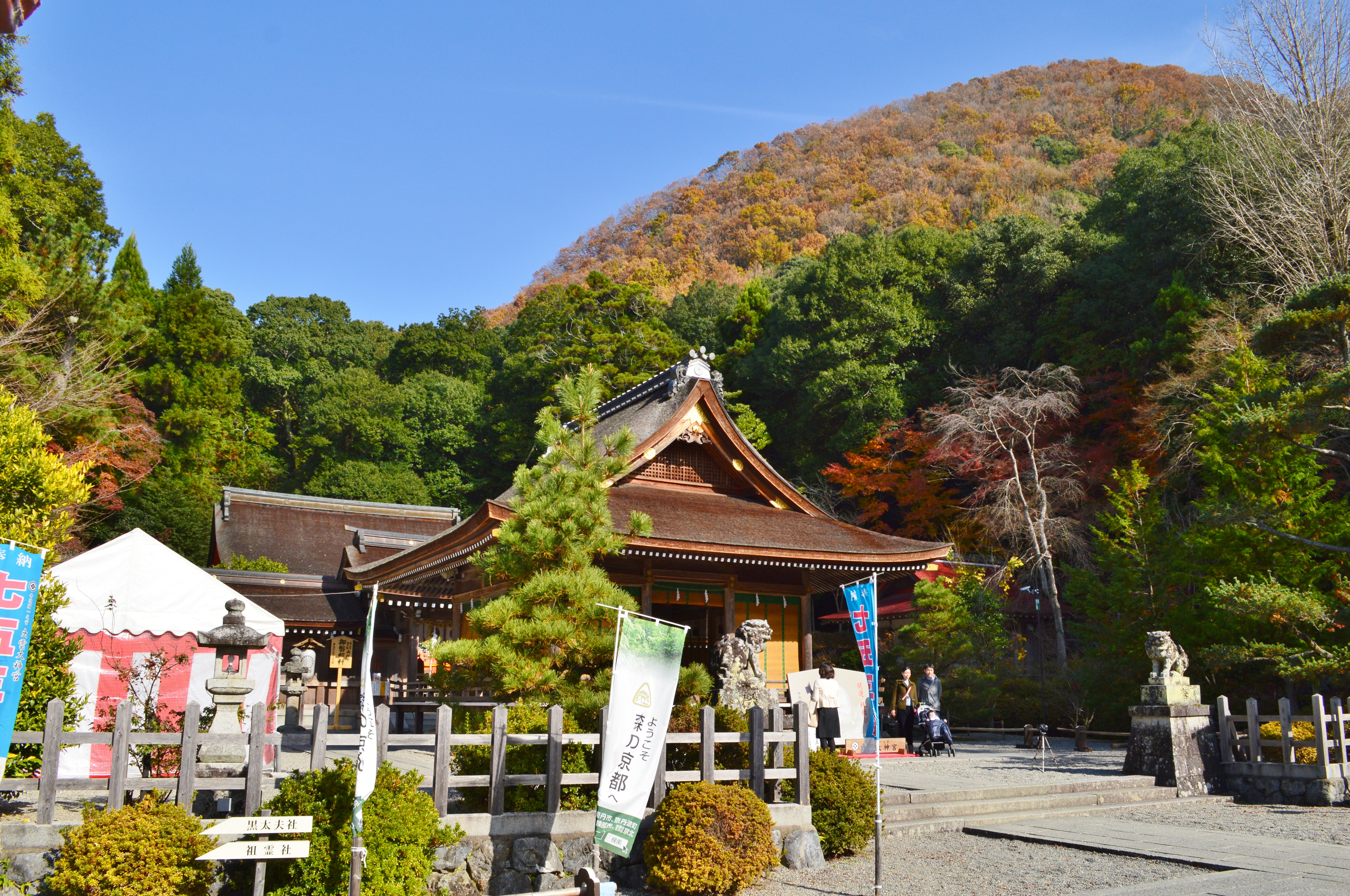
Precincts

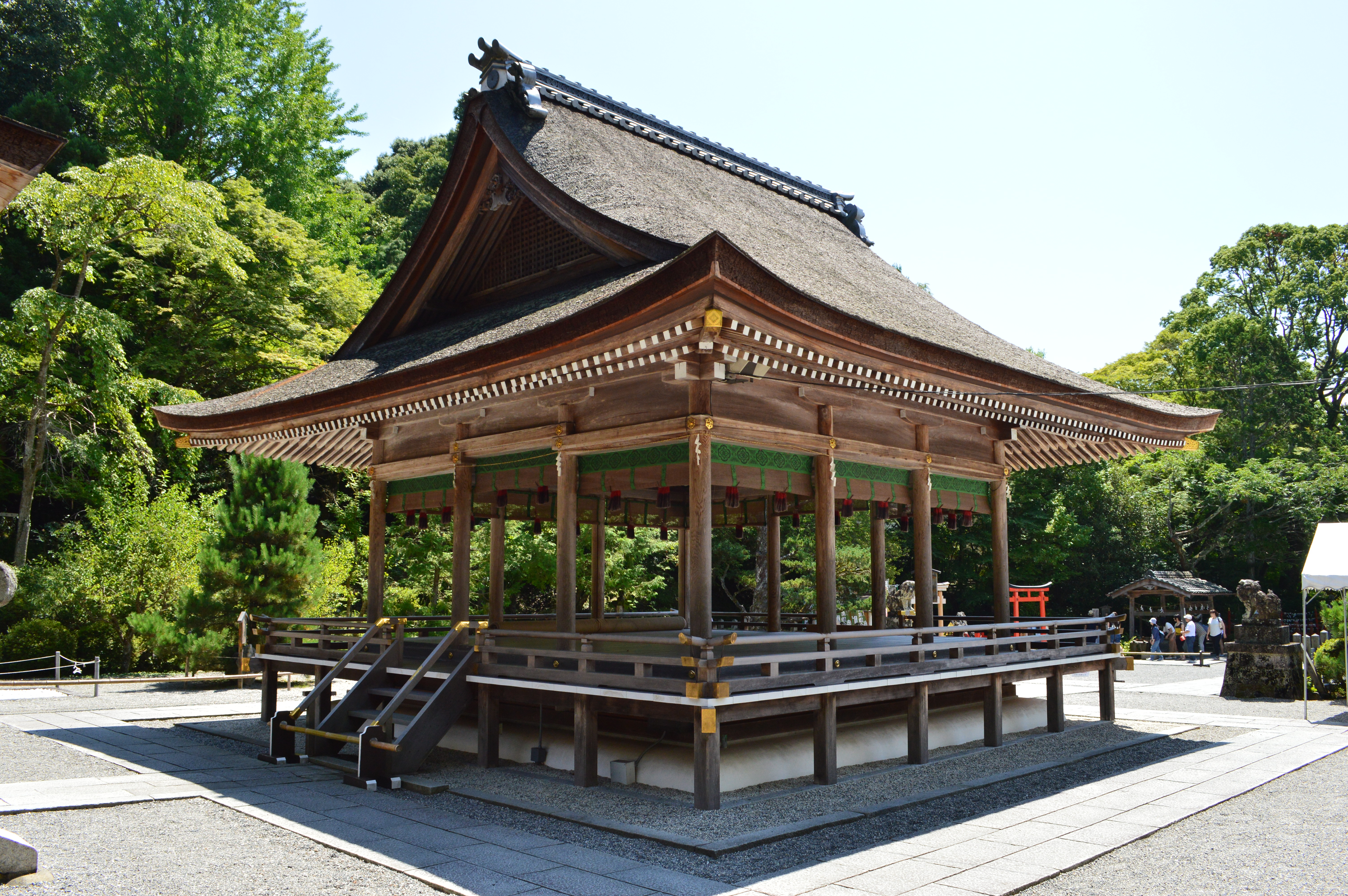
Haiden

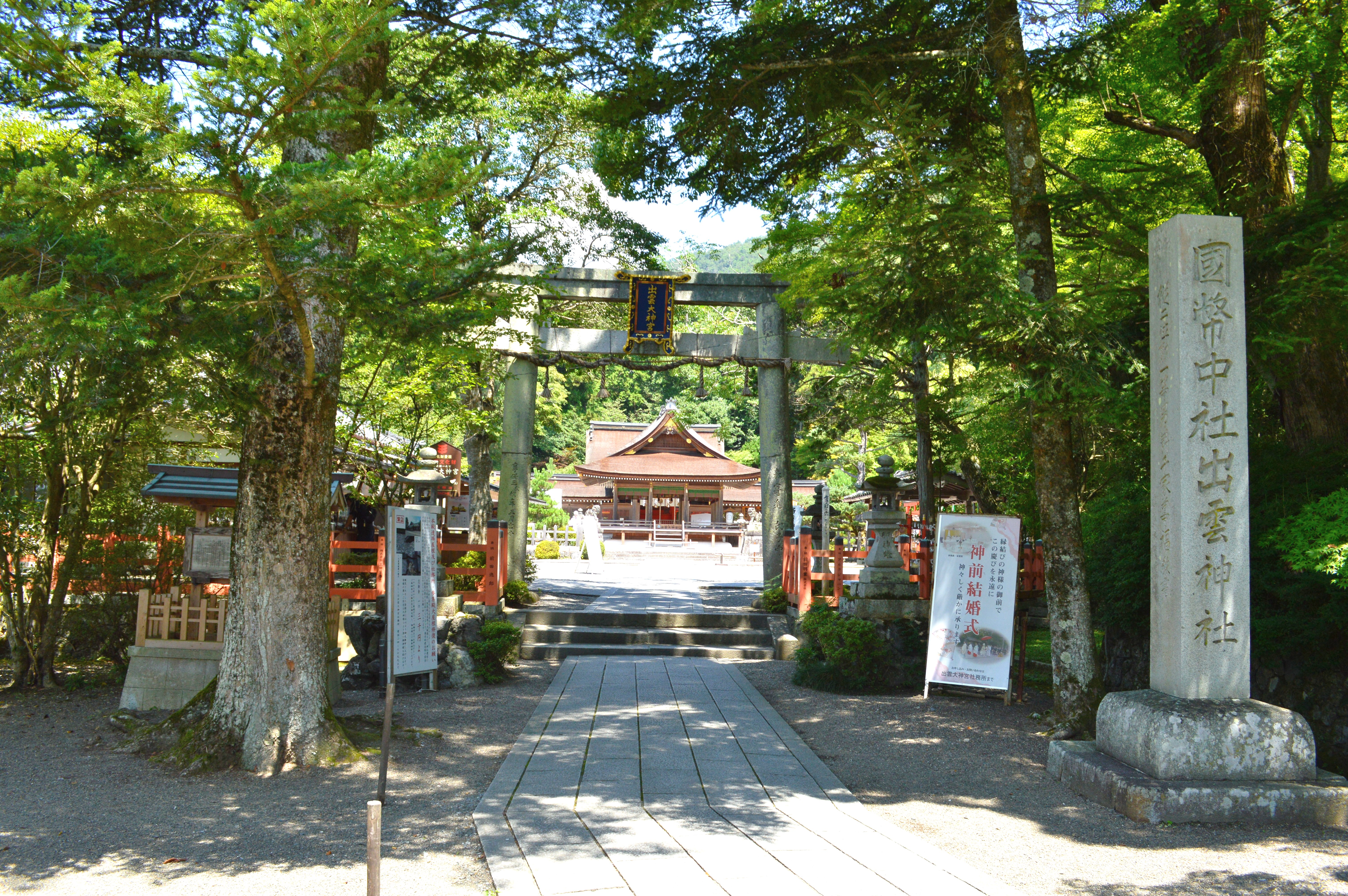
Torii

== See also ==
- List of Shinto shrines
- Ichinomiya
