= Hiezan =

Hiezan may refer to:

- Mount Hiei (also known as Hieizan or Hiezan)
- Enryaku-ji (Mount Hiei or Hieizan Temple and Monastery) in Japan
