= Kaihōgyō =

Tendai Buddhist practice involving walking

The kaihōgyō (回峰行, circling the mountain) is an ascetic practice performed by Tendai Buddhist monks. The practice involves repeatedly walking a route on Mount Hiei, the location of the Tendai school headquarters, all the while offering prayers at halls, shrines and other sacred places. The longest observance of this practice takes 1000 days to complete, spread over seven years.

== History ==
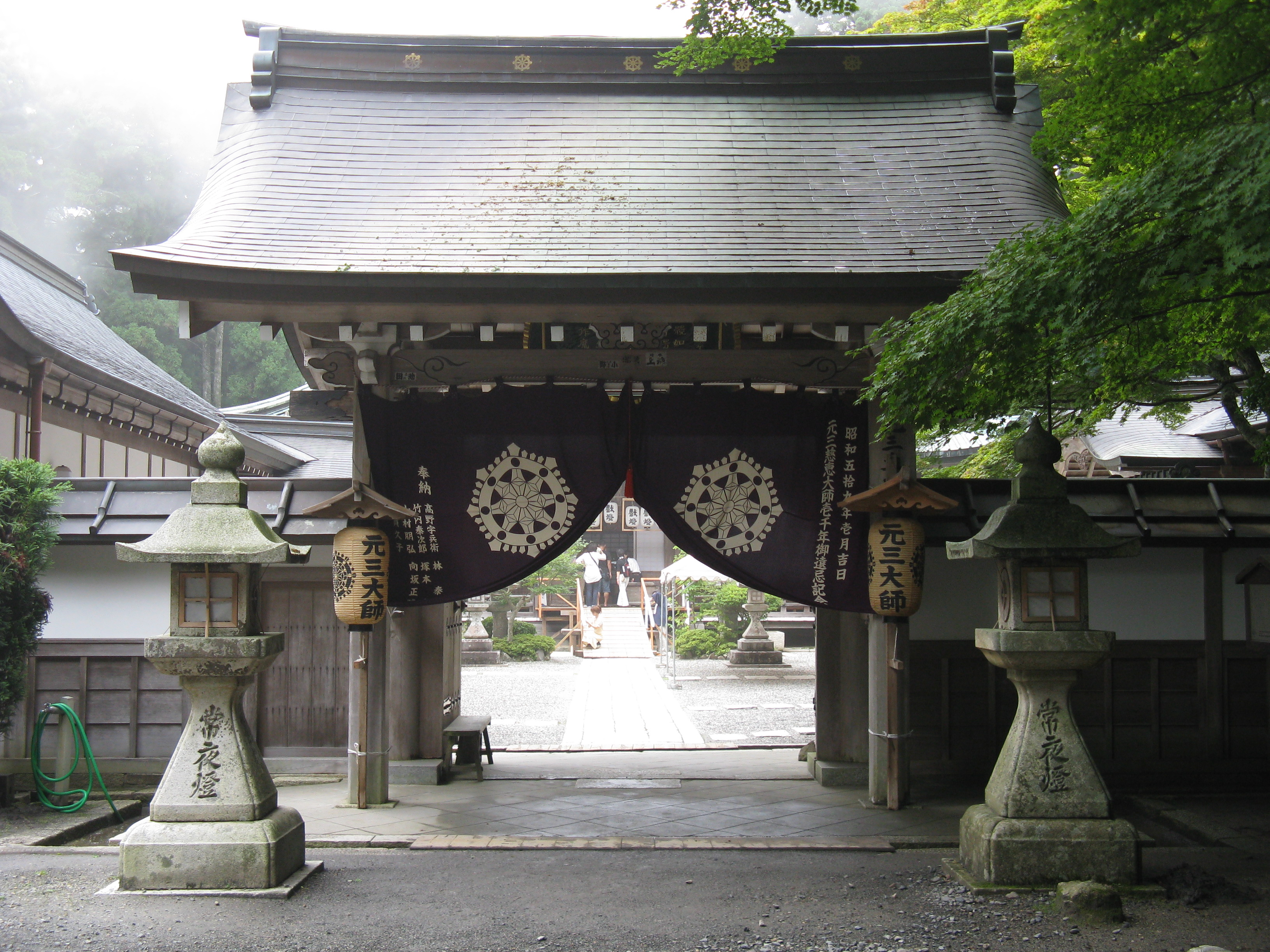
Enryaku-ji is the headquarters of the Tendai school and centre for the practice of kaihōgyō.

Sōō Kashō (831–918) is traditionally thought of as the founder of the kaihōgyō practice. Sōō was a Tendai monk who spent years performing ascetic practices on Mt Hiei and other nearby mountains. These practices were taken up by other monks and over centuries became the elaborate and highly structured system of kaihōgyō.

During the earliest phase of kaihōgyō's history Tendai monks replicated Sōō by living austere and isolated lives in the mountains, but there was no formal system and monks could adapt their practice. From 1131 to 1310 kaihōgyō was characterised by pilgrimages to the Three Pagodas of Mt Hiei. From 1311 to 1570 kaihōgyō was characterised by pilgrimages throughout Mt Hiei. Since 1571 kaihōgyō has been characterised by practices centred on the kaihōgyō circuit of Mount Hiei.

== Quest for enlightenment ==
Part of Tendai Buddhism's teaching is that enlightenment can be attained in the current life. It is through the process of selfless service and devotion that this can be achieved, and the kaihōgyō is seen as the ultimate expression of this desire. By the end of the practice the monks have achieved a form of identification with the emanation of Buddha known as Fudō Myōō (不動明王, Immovable Wisdom King).

There are many serving priests at the temple on Mount Hiei, but very few of them have completed the 1000-day kaihōgyō. Abbots of Mount Hiei temple must complete 100 days of kaihōgyō. The 1000-day practice is an uncommon and specialized area of both ascetic and esoteric disciplines.

The selection process for the kaihōgyō is after the first 100 days of practice, the gyōja or practitioner will petition the senior monks to complete the remaining 900 days. In the first 100 days, withdrawal from the challenge is possible, but from day 101 onwards the monk is no longer allowed to withdraw; historically he must either complete the course or take his own life. In contemporary times, this is symbolic, and the selection process ensures that those who embark on the practice will complete it. The mountain has many unmarked graves from those who have failed in their quest, although none date from the 20th or 21st centuries.

There are many aspects to the kaihōgyō, but the main portion of walking meditation can be broken down into the following sections:

== Practices ==
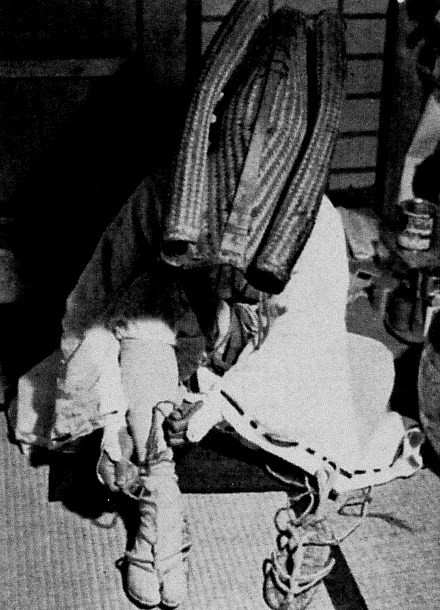
Kaihōgyō practitioner in traditional attire

There are two kaihōgyō practices; 100 days (hyaku-nichi kaihōgyō) and 1,000 days (sennichi kaihōgyō). The ultimate achievement is the completion of the 1,000-day challenge, which would rank among the most demanding physical and mental challenges in the world. Only 46 men have completed the 1,000-day challenge since 1885. Of these, three people have completed the circuit twice, most recently Yūsai Sakai (酒井雄哉; (1926–2013)), who first went from 1973 to 1980 and then, after a half year pause, went again, finishing his second round in 1987 at age 60.

The kaihōgyō takes seven years to complete, as the monks must undergo other Buddhist training in meditation and calligraphy, and perform general duties within the temple. They are required to spend 12 years total on Mount Hiei and includes vows of lifelong celibacy and sobriety in the spirit of renunciation.

The training is divided into 100-day sections as follows:

Year 1	Year 2	Year 3	Year 4	Year 5	Year 6	Year 7
30 (40) km per day for 100 days.	30 (40) km per day for 100 days.	30 (40) km per day for 100 days.	30 (40) km per day for 200 days.	30 (40) km per day for 200 days.	60 km per day for 100 days.	84 km per day for 100 days, followed by 30 (40) km per day for 100 days.
(The numbers in parentheses indicate the distance of the Imuro Valley course, which is longer.)

The walking meditation is punctuated in the middle of the term by the Katsuragawa retreat which takes 4 days. Although not required, all modern initiates have been known to add the missing days due to this retreat onto the end of their course, thereby completing the full 1000-day term.

Author John Stevens in his book The Marathon Monks of Mount Hiei describes the long distance walking style which dates back over a thousand years: "Eyes focused about 100 feet ahead while moving in a steady rhythm, keeping the head level, the shoulders relaxed, the back straight, and the nose aligned with the navel."

=== Dōiri or "Entering the Temple" ===
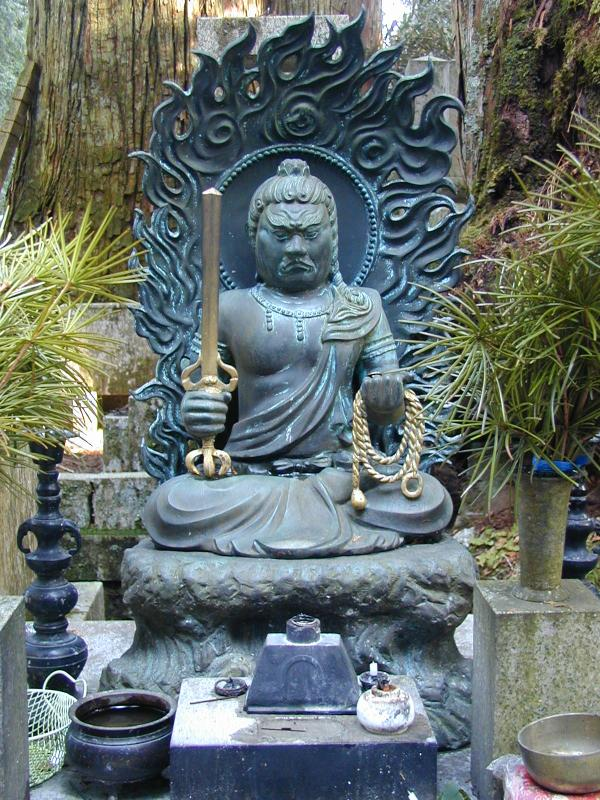
Fudō Myōō (Acala) at Mount Kōya, Japan

During the fifth year of the challenge, the walking practice is punctuated by what many consider the most daunting phase of the process. The ascetic monk must go for nine days without food, water, or rest of any kind. He sits in the Temple and recites the Fudō Myōō mantra constantly. Two monks accompany him, one on either side, to ensure he does not fall asleep. At 2 am every night he must get up to fetch water for offering from a special well, around 200m away, as an offering for Fudō Myōō.

=== Clothing ===
Kaihōgyō practitioners are thought to represent a living Fudō Myōō, and each item of clothing symbolises this in some way. Practitioners wear a distinctive hat made from woven strips of hinoki wood, with both sides rolled up to make an oblong tube. Until they have completed their first 300 days, practitioners carry the hat under their left arm and are only permitted to wear it during rain. In case the monk dies while undertaking the practice, a coin called a rokumon-sen is kept in the hat to be used to pay for the ferry across the Sanzu River, the mythological river separating the living from the dead. White robes are worn, with this colour traditionally associated with death in Japanese culture. Waraji are worn as footwear, and tabi are permitted after the first 300 days have been completed. The waraji represent lotus petals, which buddhas and bodhisattvas are depicted as standing on in Buddhist iconography. Practitioners traditionally carry a dagger and hemp rope with which to kill themselves if they are unable to finish their practice.

== See also ==
- Milarepa – supernatural running
- Shugendō
