= Siege of Mount Hiei =

1571 battle in Japan

- Part of the Sengoku period
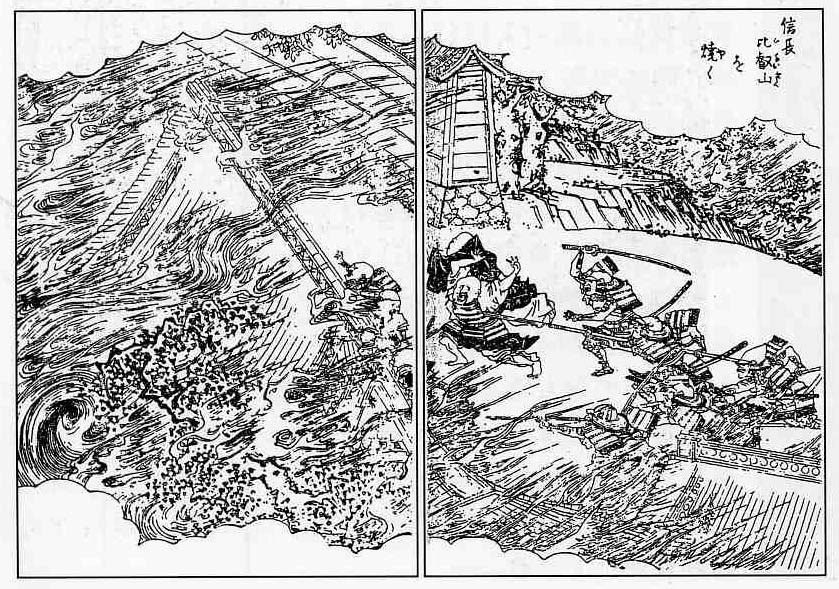
- Nobunaga forces setting fire to Enryaku-ji and massacring the monks (depiction in the Ehon taikōki)
Date	September 30, 1571
Location	Mount Hiei, Ōmi Province, Japan
Result	Oda victory

Belligerents
Forces of Oda Nobunaga	Sōhei of Enryaku-ji on Mt. Hiei

Commanders and leaders
Oda Nobunaga; Sakuma Nobumori; Akechi Mitsuhide; Ikeda Tsuneoki; Niwa Nagahide; Kawajiri Hidetaka	Various monk leaders

Strength
30,000	4,000

Casualties and losses
300	Unknown number of buildings 1,500–4,000 people

The siege of Mount Hiei was a battle of the Sengoku period of Japan fought between Oda Nobunaga and the sōhei (warrior monks) of the monasteries of Enryaku-ji on Mount Hiei near Kyoto on September 30, 1571. It is said that Oda Nobunaga killed all the monks, scholars, priests, women, and children that lived on the mountain in this battle. However, recent excavations have pointed out that many of the facilities may have been abolished before this and the destruction was less than some historical sources indicate.

== Background ==
The trigger for the conflict was Nobunaga’s extortion of military funds from the territory of Mount Hiei. In 1569 Jiin-hosou, the lord of the mountain, worked in the imperial court. Because of this, the imperial court requested funds for the restoration of the temple territory, but Nobunaga refused. Nobunaga went on to win the Battle of Anegawa on July 30, 1570. However in the battles of Noda Castle and Fukushima Castle on August 26, 1570, the allied forces of Azai Nagamasa and Asakura Yoshikage were victorious. The Azai-Asakura forces stood on Mt. Hiei and were besieged by Nobunaga’s forces (Siege of Shiga), but they were reconciled by the mediation of Emperor Ogimachi.

In addition to the Azai-Asakura forces, Rokkaku Yoshikata was active as a guerrilla in the southern part of Omi and Koka, and the Miyoshi clan was also aiming to regain Kyoto by suppressing Settsu and Kawachi. In addition, Kōsa, who led the Ikkō-ikki issued orders to the Settsu, Kawachi, Omi, Ise, and the Owari monks who were under Nobunaga’s thumb. On January 2, 1571, Kinoshita Hideyoshi, the owner of Yokoyama Castle, was ordered to block the sea and land routes leading from Osaka to Echizen. The purpose was to cut off contact between Ishiyama Hongan-ji Temple, the Azai-Asakura alliance, and Rokkaku Yoshikata. Nobunaga ordered his men to interrogate and kill any suspicious people. The blockade of traffic at this time seems to have been quite strict, as stated in the "Kenkenki", a diary written by Monzeki Hironori.

In February of the same year, the isolated Sawayama Castle surrendered, and the castle owner Isono Kazumasa evacuated, so Nobunaga assigned Niwa Nagahide as the castle owner and secured a passage from Gifu Castle to the lakeside plain. In May, the Azai army teamed up with the Ikko-ikki to re-enter the Ane River and attack Hidemura Hori. Kinoshita Hideyoshi helped Hori and fought hard, and the Ikko-Ikki and Azai forces were defeated. In the same month, Nobunaga burned down the villages that participated in the Sieges of Nagashima in Ise. He then attacked Odani Castle, which was the residence of Nagamasa on August 18. On September 1, he ordered Shibata Katsuie and Sakuma Nobumori to besiege Shimura Castle and Kogawa Castle, which were the bases of Rokkaku Yoshikata and Omi's Ikko-ikki. At Shimura Castle, there were 670 head hunters, and it is believed that they were almost wiped out. Seeing that, the soldiers of Ogawa Castle surrendered. Kanegamori Castle was also besieged, but it fell without a big battle.

On September 29, Nobunaga marched around Sakamoto and Mitsui-ji Temple, and set up his headquarters at Yamaoka Keigaku's mansion.

The lord of Mt. Hiei at that time was Kakujo, the younger brother of Emperor Ogimachi. Mt. Hiei was the intersection of Hokuriku Road and Togoku Road for those aiming for Kyoto, and there were many shrines on the mountain, making it a strategically important base capable of holding tens of thousands of soldiers.

In the previous offensive and defensive battle of Mt. Hiei, the Mt. Hiei side refused the peace that promised to return the temple territory that Nobunaga extorted, and also supported the Asai-Asakura alliance. Nobunaga is said to have considered completely destroying the military base. Due to Nobunaga being surrounded by enemy forces, the neutralization of Mt. Hiei was considered to be an important issue for breaking the front line.

The Enryaku-ji pleaded for the suspension of the attack by giving 300 gold coins, along with 200 more from nearby Katata, but Nobunaga refused. The monks and soldiers who lived around Sakamoto gathered at Nemoto Nakado on the mountaintop, and the residents of Sakamoto and their wives and children also fled toward the mountain.

== Siege ==
On September 30, 1571, Oda Nobunaga ordered his entire army led by Sakuma Nobumori, Ikeda Tsuneoki and Akechi Mitsuhide to make a total attack. First, Oda's army set fire and burned Sakamoto and Katata. In "Nobunaga Koki", the situation at this time was "On September 30, Mount Hiei was burned down, including Nemoto Nakado, the shrine to Sanno, and others. No Buddha, shrine, monk, or sutra were left behind, and they were burned down to ash. As they escaped up the mountain, they attacked with a battle cry from all sides of the mountain. The soldiers beat the monks, scholars, priests, woman and children one by one.” In “Shinchō Kōki", the monks, soldiers and residents who lived around Sakamoto were at Mt. Hachioji in the inner part of Hiyoshi Taisha Shrine, but were also burned.

Contemporary sources seem divided about the exact number of deaths. In Shinchō Kōki, thousands were said to have died, in a letter from Luis Frois the death toll was estimated to be about 1,500, and in the “Tokitsugu Yamashina” it was estimated that between 3,000 and 4,000 were killed.

== Aftermath ==
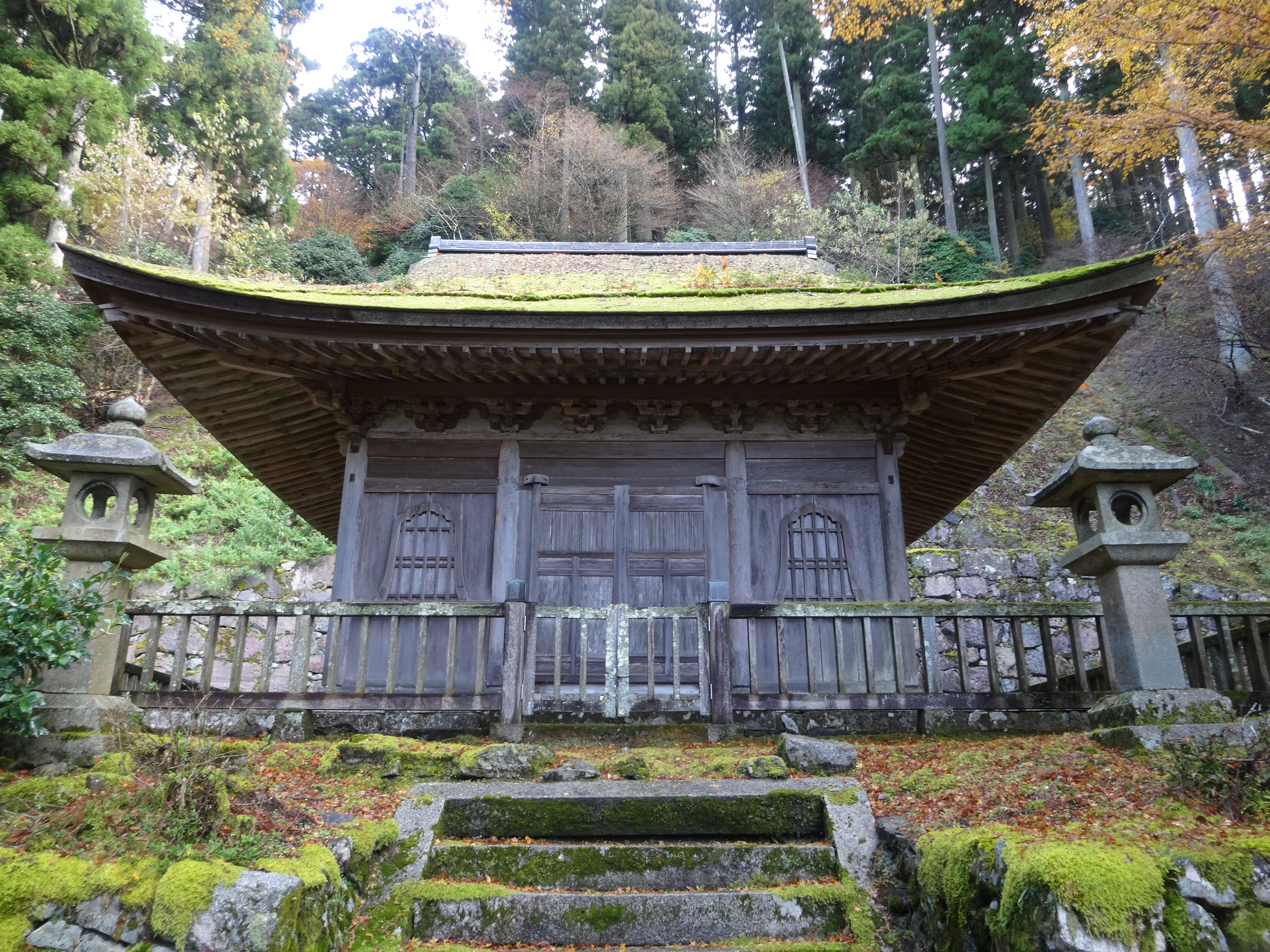
Ruri-dō (瑠璃堂, "Lapis Lazuli Hall") is the only building that survived the siege.

Nobunaga left the post-war processing to Akechi Mitsuhide. After that, in the battle between Miyake and Kanamori, the temple in Omi was set on fire. Enryaku-ji and Hiyoshi Taisha Shrine disappeared, and the temple territory and shrine territory were confiscated and distributed to Akechi Mitsuhide, Sakuma Nobumori, Nakagawa Shigemasa, Shibata Katsuie, and Niwa Nagahide. These five warlords would each dispatch their powers to this area to rule. In particular, Mitsuhide and Nobumori would control this area, and Mitsuhide would go on to build Sakamoto Castle .

On the Enryaku-ji side, Seikakuin Gosei and others were able to escape and asked Takeda Shingen for asylum. Shingen attempted to protect them and rebuild the temple, but died of illness in May, 1573. According to the record of Hiyoshi Taisha Shrine in June 1579, the Emperor Ogimachi issued a statement to revive the Hyakuhachi shrine, but Nobunaga suppressed the revival and the revival movement was stopped.

After that, in 1582, Nobunaga committed seppuku in the Honnoji Incident, and Mitsuhide was lost in the Battle of Yamazaki, and the surviving monks began to return to the mountain one after another.

Only one minor building survived the siege, the Ruri-dō (瑠璃堂, "Lapis Lazuli Hall"), which is located down a long, unmarked path from the Sai-tō complex. The structure dates originally to the 13th century and was repaired twice in the 20th century. Reconstruction of Enryaku-ji commenced not long after the death of Oda Nobunaga and his successor Toyotomi Hideyoshi, but never regained its former size.

== Archaeological excavation of Enryaku-ji ==
In the latter half of the 20th century, excavations were conducted intermittently due to the reconstruction of the area and the construction of the Oku-Hiei Driveway, and an archaeological reexamination of the burning of Mount Hiei was carried out.

According to archaeologist Yasuaki Kaneyasu, the only buildings that can be clearly pointed out to be burnt down by Nobunaga's burning are the Nemoto Nakado and the Grand Lecture Hall. He points out that most of the other buildings were abolished before the burning. As for the relics, the relics of the Heian period are prominent. The excavation sites were not surveyed over the entire mountain of Mt. Hiei, but were limited to the East Pagoda, West Pagoda, and Yokogawa, but the number of temples located on Mt. Hiei at the time of burning was limited. Since there are few relics from the 16th century, it is clear many of the monks went down to the area around Sakamoto, as described in the Enryakuji Diary. Therefore, the 500 temples and shrines described "Tokitsugu Yamashina" and "Diary on the Hot Spring" that were all turned into ashes, and 3000 monks and men were beheaded one by one, are likely greatly exaggerated. The theory that the entire mountain became a sea of fire, arson was intermittently carried out by September 15, and genocide was carried out points out that it may be overstated.

Kaneyasu concluded that "the time has come to reconstruct the historical view of the Warring States period, including the character of Oda Nobunaga".
