= Mount Hiei =

Mountain in Japan

- 比叡山
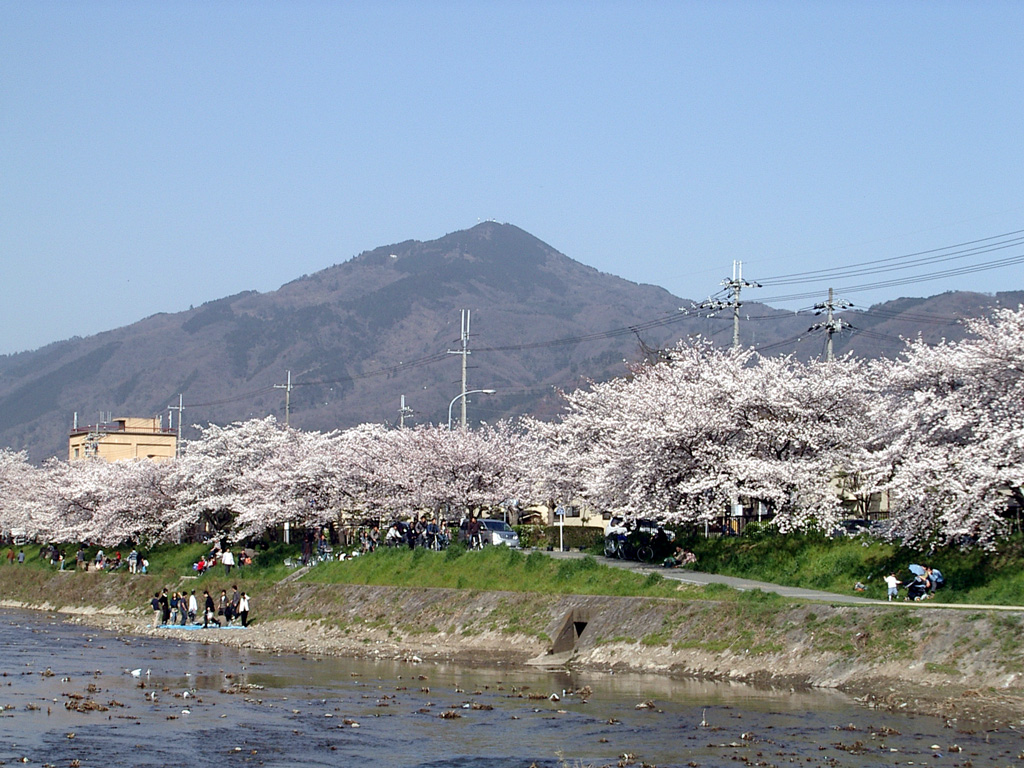
- The view from Kyoto with Cherry blossoms (April 2005)

Highest point
- Elevation: 848.1 m (2,782 ft)
- Listing: List of mountains and hills of Japan by height
- Coordinates: 35°4′0″N 135°50′18″E

Geography
- Location: Honshū, Shiga Prefecture, Japan
- Topo map(s): Geographical Survey Institute 25000:1 京都東北部, 50000:1 京都及大阪

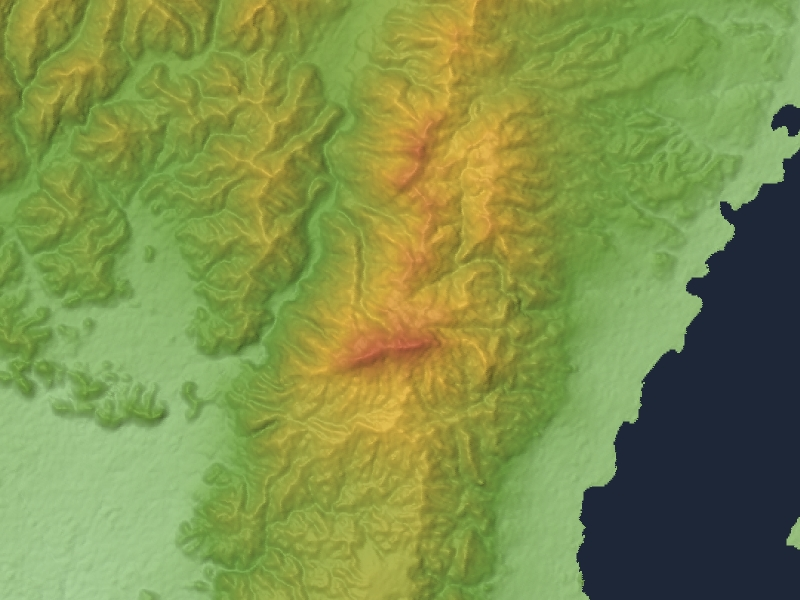
Relief map of Mount Hiei

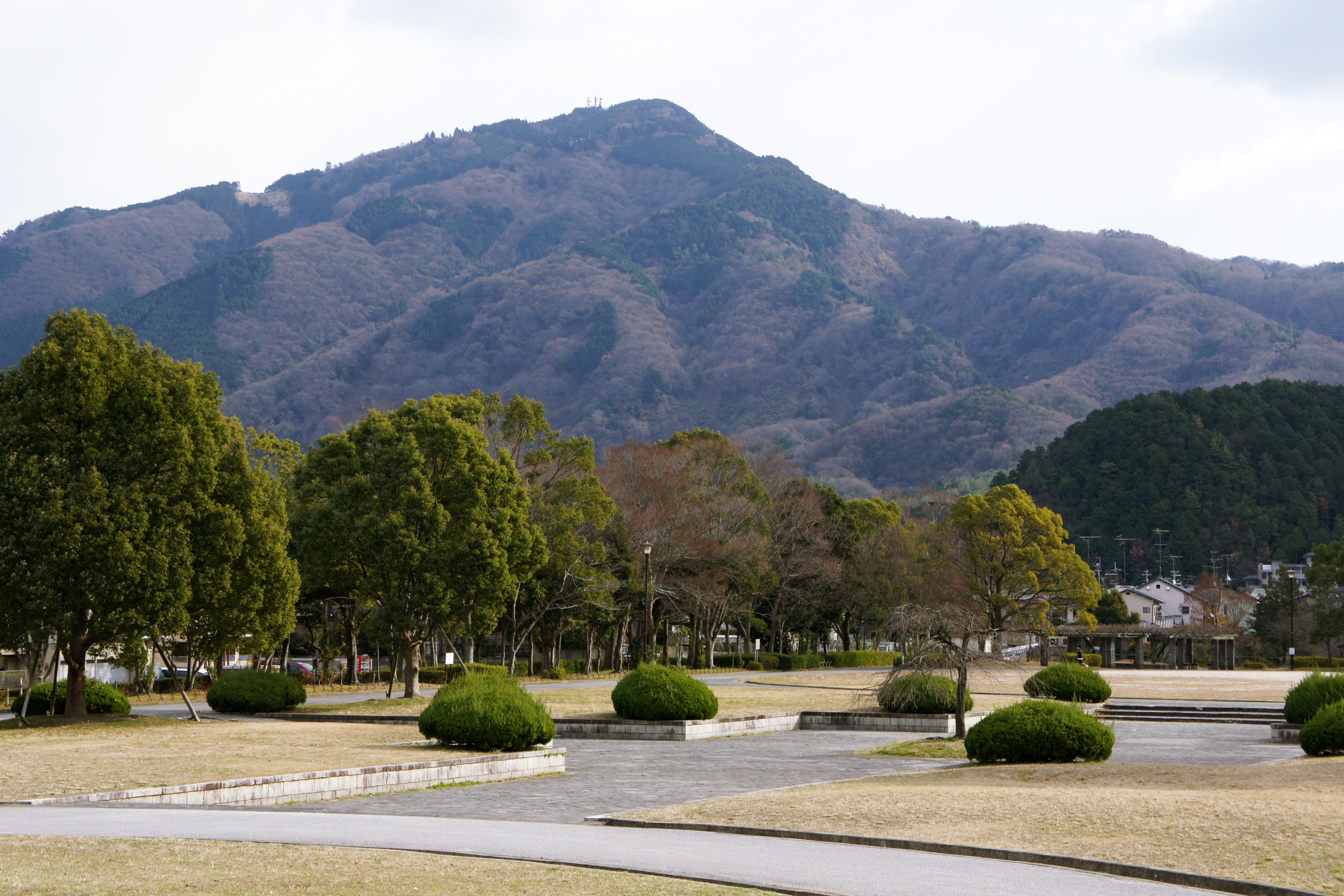
West side

Mount Hiei (比叡山, Hiei-zan) is a mountain to the northeast of Kyoto, lying on the border between the Kyoto and Shiga Prefectures, Japan.

The temple of Enryaku-ji, the first outpost of the Japanese Tendai (Chin. Tiantai) sect of Buddhism, was founded atop Mount Hiei by Saichō in 788 and rapidly grew into a sprawling complex of temples and buildings that were roughly divided into three areas:

1. The Saitō (西塔; "West Pagoda") area near the summit, and technically in Kyoto Prefecture.
2. The Tōdō (東塔; "East Pagoda") area, also near the summit, where Enryaku-ji Temple was first founded, and located just within Shiga Prefecture.
3. The Yokawa (横川; "Along the river") area near the northernmost end of Mount Hiei. Due to its remoteness, as a temple complex it experienced periods of revival and decline, starting with Ennin, later revived by Ryōgen and made famous by the scholar-monk Genshin.

Due to its position north-east of the ancient capital of Heian-kyō (Kyoto), it was thought in ancient geomancy to be a protective bulwark against negative influences on the capital, which along with the rise of the Tendai sect in the Heian period (8th - 12th centuries) meant that the mountain and the temple complex were politically powerful and influential. Later schools of Buddhism in Japan were almost entirely founded by ex-monks of the Tendai sect, such as Hōnen, Nichiren, Dōgen and Shinran, who all studied at the temple before leaving Mount Hiei to start their own practices.

The temple complex was razed by Oda Nobunaga in 1571 to quell the rising power of Tendai's sōhei (warrior monks). It was rebuilt and remains Tendai headquarters to this day.

The 19th-century Japanese ironclad Hiei was named after this mountain, as was the more famous World War II-era battleship Hiei, the latter having initially been built as a battlecruiser.

== Mount Hiei in folklore ==
Mount Hiei has been featured in many folk tales over the ages. Initially, it was thought to be the home of indigenous gods and spirits, and there was a shrine to Oyamakui no Kami, also known in the shinbutsu-shūgō system as Sannō Gongen (山王権現). However, it is now predominantly known for the monks of Enryaku-ji.

== Marathon monks ==
John Stevens wrote the book The Marathon Monks of Mount Hiei, chronicling the practice of walking long distances – up to 52 miles (84 km) a day for 100 straight days, in an effort to attain enlightenment. The practice of walking is known as the kaihōgyō.

A 2010 US National Public Radio report described the sennichi kaihōgyō (thousand-day kaihōgyō) as

...1,000 days of walking meditation and prayer over a seven-year period around Mount Hiei. [The 13th disciple since WWII to complete the cycle] walked 26 miles a day for periods of either 100 or 200 consecutive days — a total distance about the same as walking around the Earth.

== Attractions ==
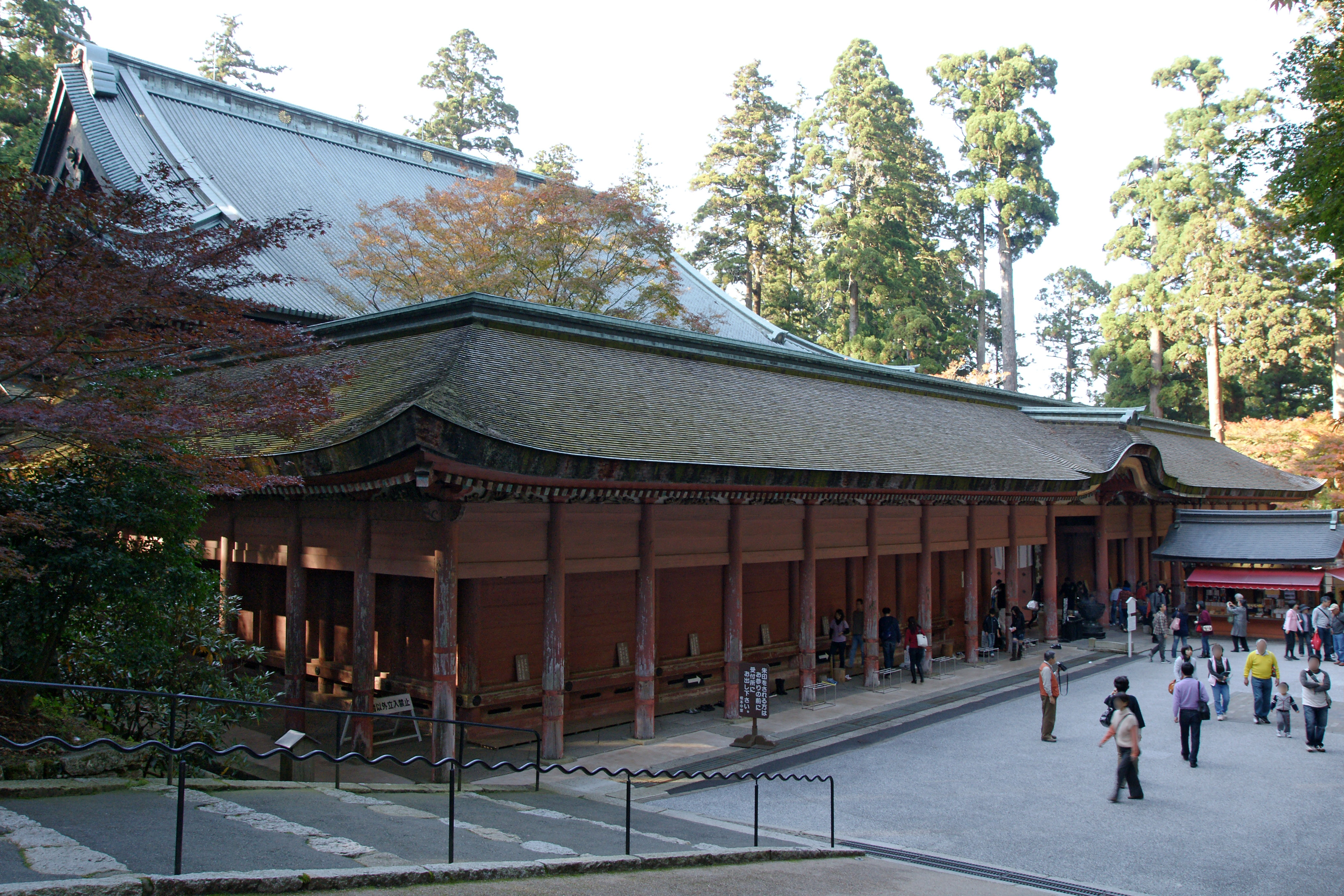
Enryaku-ji monastery on Mount Hiei

Beyond the mountain itself, its forests, and the views it affords – of Kyoto, of Ohara, of lake Biwa and Shiga – the main attraction is the temple complex of Enryaku-ji. The temple complex spreads out over the mountain, but is concentrated in three areas, connected by foot trails. There are also more minor temples and shrines.

Unusually, there are also a number of French-themed attractions – the peak itself features the Garden Museum Hiei, which is themed on French impressionism, featuring gardens and French paintings, while there is also a French-themed hotel, "L'hotel de Hiei" (The Hiei Hotel). The mountain is busiest during the daytime, but has some visitors in the evenings, for light-up displays and to see the night view of the surrounding towns.

== Access ==
The mountain is a popular area for hikers and a toll road provides access by automobile to the top of the mountain; there are also buses that connect the mountaintop to town a few times a day. There are also two routes of funiculars: the Eizan Cable from the Kyoto side to the connecting point with an aerial tramway ("ropeway") to the top, and the Sakamoto Cable from the Shiga side to the foot of Enryaku-ji.

The attractions on the mountain are quite spread out, so there are regular buses during the daytime connecting the attractions. The center for these is the bus center, in front of the entrance to the main temple complex at Tō-tō (東塔; "East Pagoda").

== See also ==
- Kaihōgyō
- Shugendō
- The 100 Views of Nature in Kansai
