= Enryaku-ji =

Buddhist monastery in Shiga Prefecture, Japan

Coordinates: 35°04′14″N 135°50′28″E

- 延暦寺
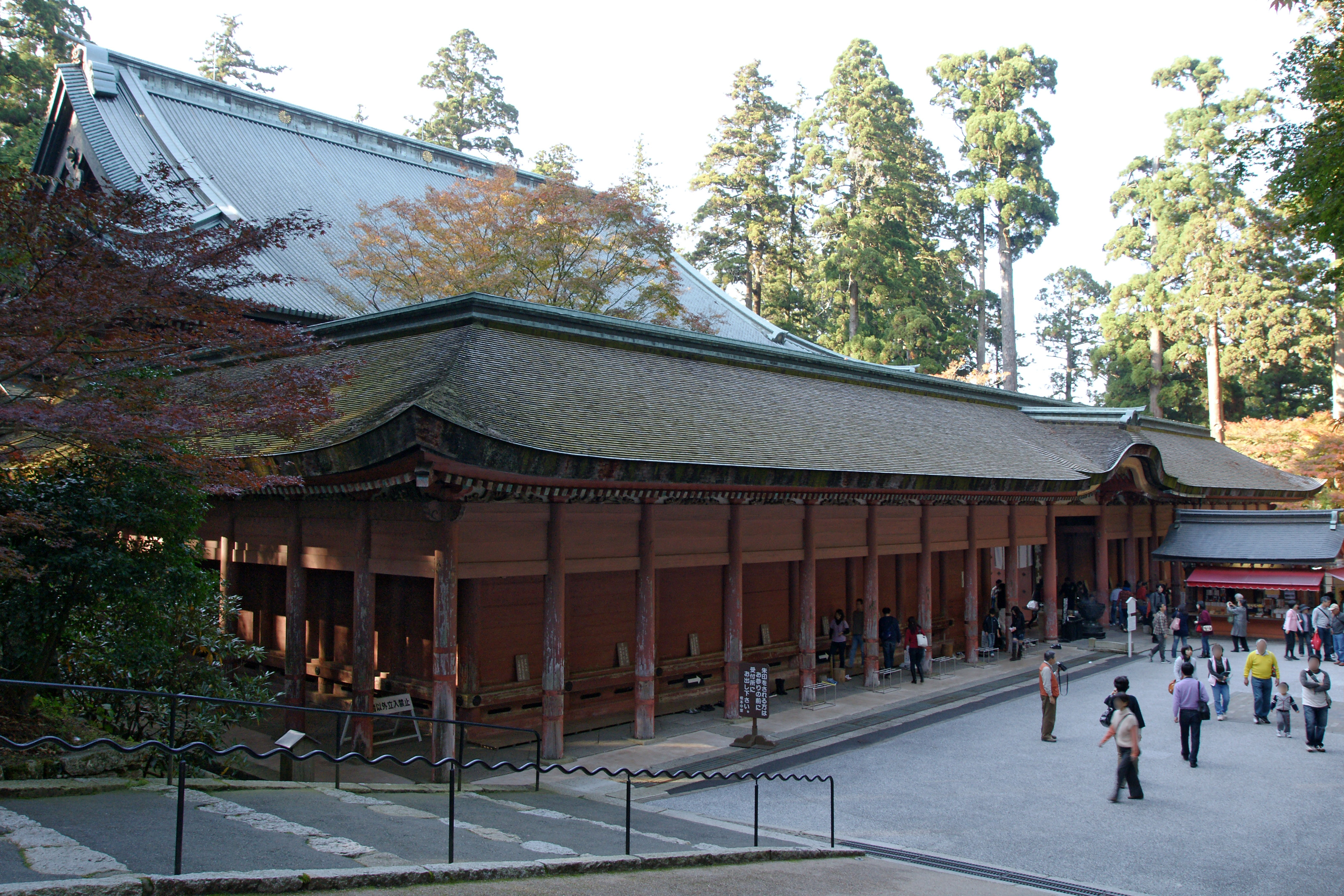
- Konpon-chūdō (根本中堂), Enryaku-ji's main hall)

Religion
- Affiliation: Tendai
- Deity: Bhaisajyaguru (Yakushi Nyorai)

Location
- Location: 4220 Sakamoto Honchō, Ōtsu, Shiga Prefecture
- Country: Japan
- Interactive map of Enryaku-ji

Architecture
- Founder: Saichō
- Established: 788
- Completed: 1642 (reconstruction)

Website
- www.hieizan.or.jp

Enryaku-ji (延暦寺, Enryaku-ji) is a Tendai monastery located on Mount Hiei in Ōtsu, overlooking Kyoto. It was first founded in 788 during the early Heian period (794–1185) by Saichō (767–822), also known as Dengyō Daishi, who introduced the Tendai sect of Mahayana Buddhism to Japan from China. The temple complex has undergone several reconstruction efforts since then, with the most significant (that of the main hall) taking place in 1642 under Tokugawa Iemitsu. Enryaku-ji is the headquarters of the Tendai sect and one of the most significant monasteries in Japanese history. As such, it is part of the UNESCO World Heritage Site "Historic Monuments of Ancient Kyoto (Kyoto, Uji and Otsu Cities)". The founders of Jōdo-shū, Jōdo Shinshū, Sōtō Zen, and Nichiren Buddhism all spent time at the monastery. Enryaku-ji is also the center for the practice of kaihōgyō (aka the "marathon monks").

== History ==
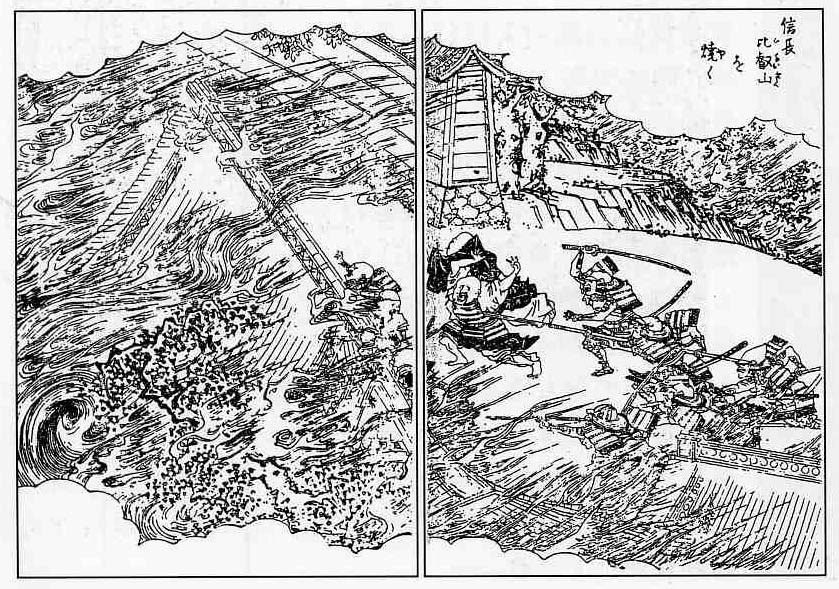
Nobunaga forces setting fire to Enryaku-ji and massacring the monks in the Siege of Mount Hiei in 1571 (depiction in the Ehon taikouki)

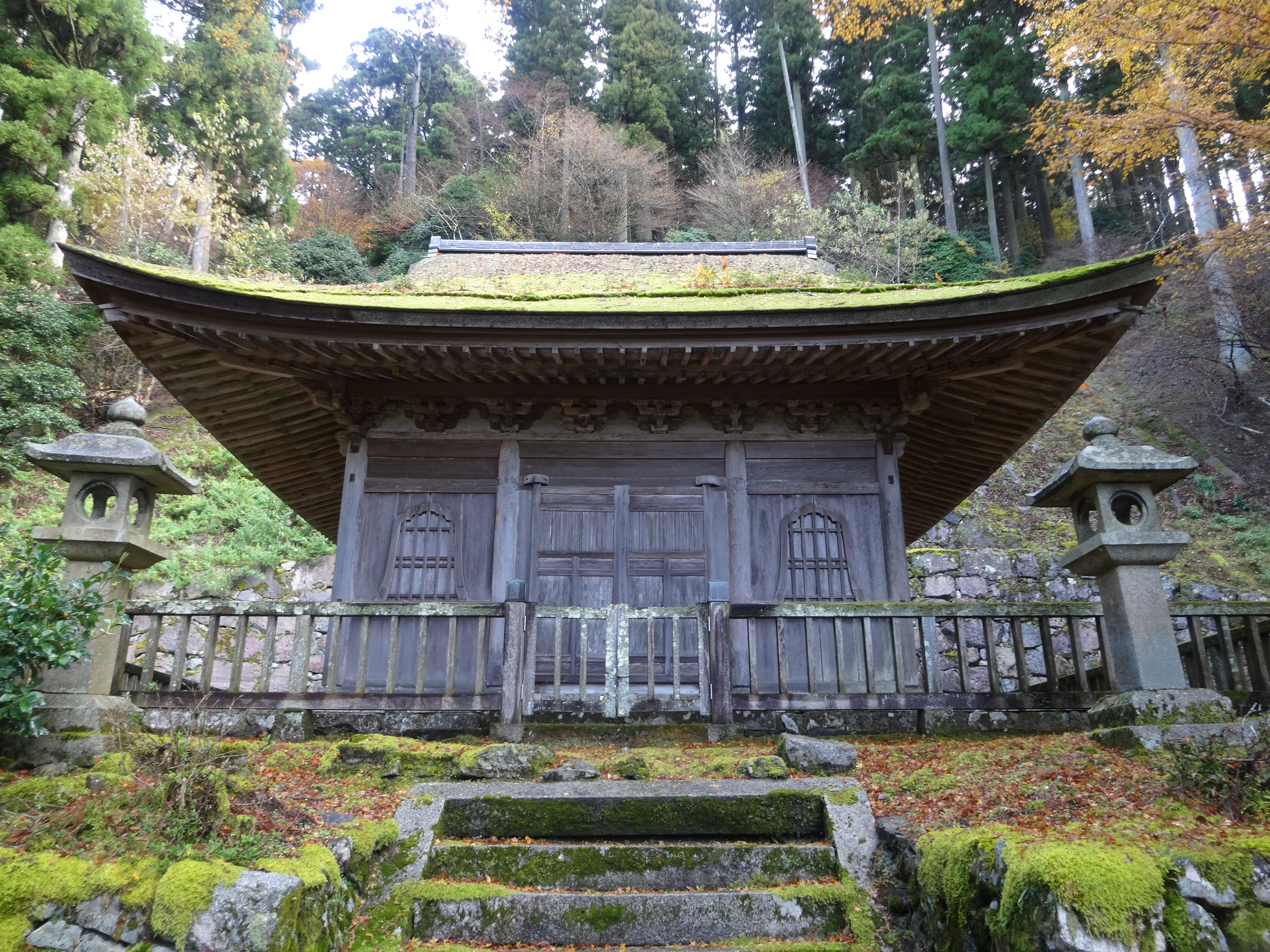
Ruri-dō (瑠璃堂, "Lapis Lazuli Hall") is the only building that survived the siege of 1571.

With the support of Emperor Kanmu, the Buddhist monk Saichō ordained a hundred disciples in 807. Maintaining a strict discipline on Mt. Hiei, his monks lived in seclusion for twelve years of study and meditation. After this period, the best students were retained in positions in the monastery and others graduated into positions in the government. At the peak of its power, Enryaku-ji was a huge complex of as many as 3,000 sub-temples and a powerful army of warrior monks (僧兵, sōhei). In the tenth century, succession disputes broke out between Tendai monks of the line of Ennin and Enchin. These disputes resulted in opposing Tendai centers at Enryaku-ji and at Mii-dera, known respectively as the Mountain Order (山門, sanmon) and the Temple Order (寺門, jimon). Warrior monks were used to settle the disputes, and Tendai leaders began to hire mercenary armies who threatened rivals and even marched on the capital to enforce monastic demands.

As part of a program to remove all potential rivals and unite the country, warlord Oda Nobunaga ended this Buddhist militancy in 1571 by attacking Enryaku-ji, leveling the buildings and slaughtering monks. Enryaku-ji's current structures date from the late 16th century through the first half of the 17th century, when the temple was reconstructed following a change of government. Only one minor building survived, the Ruri-dō (るり堂, "Lapis Lazuli Hall"), which is located down a long, unmarked path from the Sai-tō complex. The structure dates to the 13th century and was repaired twice during the 20th century following harsh weather. During reconstruction, some buildings were transferred from other temples, notably Mii-dera, and thus the buildings themselves are old, though they have not always been at this location.

Today, most of Enryaku-ji's buildings are clustered in three areas: Tō-dō (東塔, "East Pagoda"), Sai-tō (西塔, "West Pagoda"), and Yokokawa (横川). The monastery's most important buildings are concentrated in Tō-dō. Sai-tō is a 20-minute walk away, primarily downhill from Tō-dō, and also features several important buildings. Yokokawa is more isolated and less visited, about a 1:30 walk, and is most easily reached by bus, which connects the three complexes and other locations on the mountain.

On April 4, 2006, Enryaku-ji performed a ceremony for former leaders of Yamaguchi-gumi, by far the largest yakuza organization in Japan. Because such temple ceremonies have been used for Yamaguchi-gumi fund-raising and demonstrations of power, the Shiga Prefectural Police requested that Enryaku-ji cease performance of the ceremony. Rejecting the request, Enryaku-ji received crime-related money for the ceremony and allowed nearly 100 upper-level Yamaguchi-gumi leaders to attend. After reports in the Asahi Shimbun and Yomiuri Shimbun newspapers, Enryaku-ji faced a nationwide scandal. The temple was also criticized by the Japan Buddhist Temple Association (representing 75,000 Buddhist temples), which led a movement against the yakuza. Finally on May 18, all representative directors of Enryaku-ji resigned, apologizing on their website and in e-mails which were sent to 3,000 branch temples.

== Gallery ==
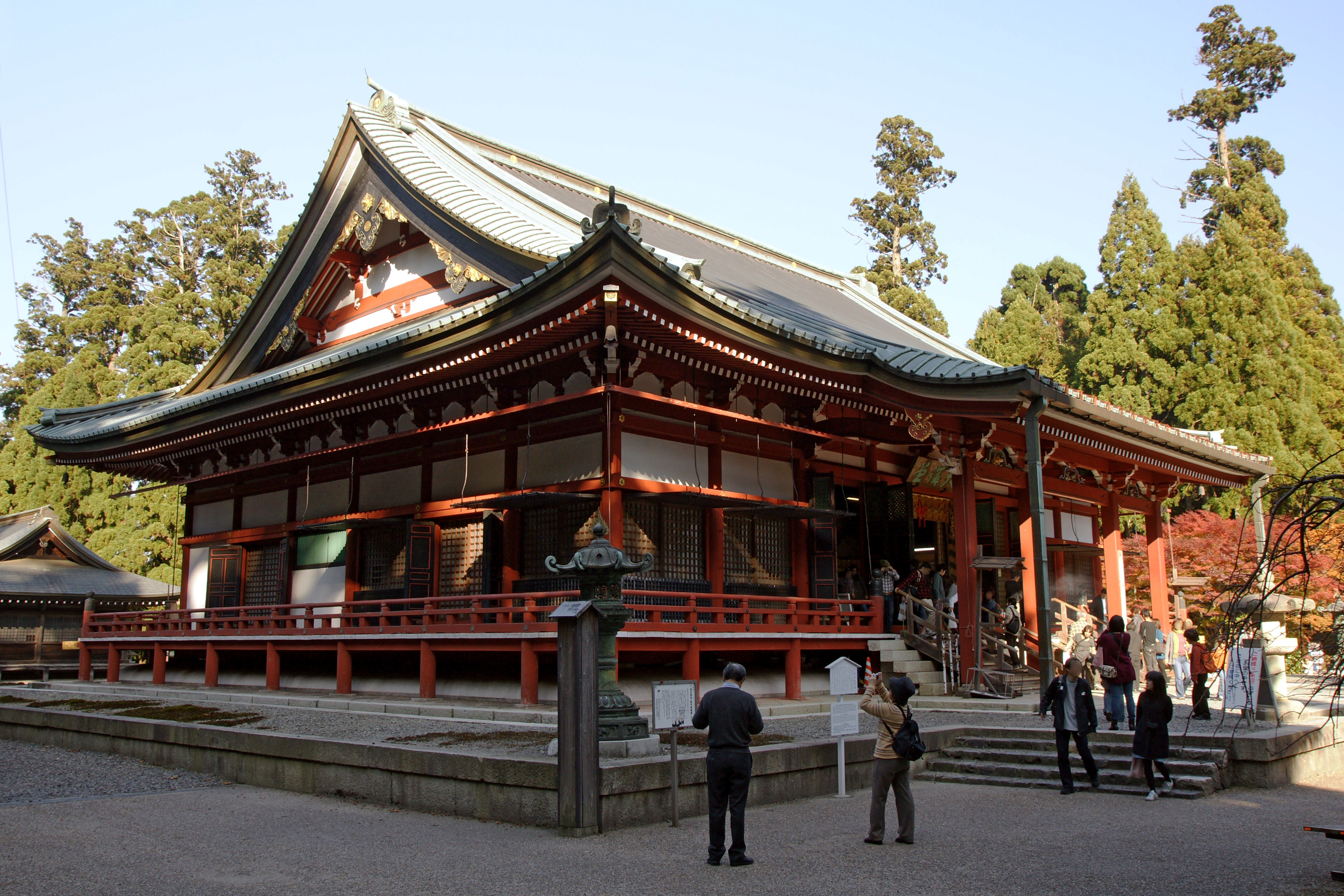
Great Lecture Hall (大講堂, Daikō-dō)

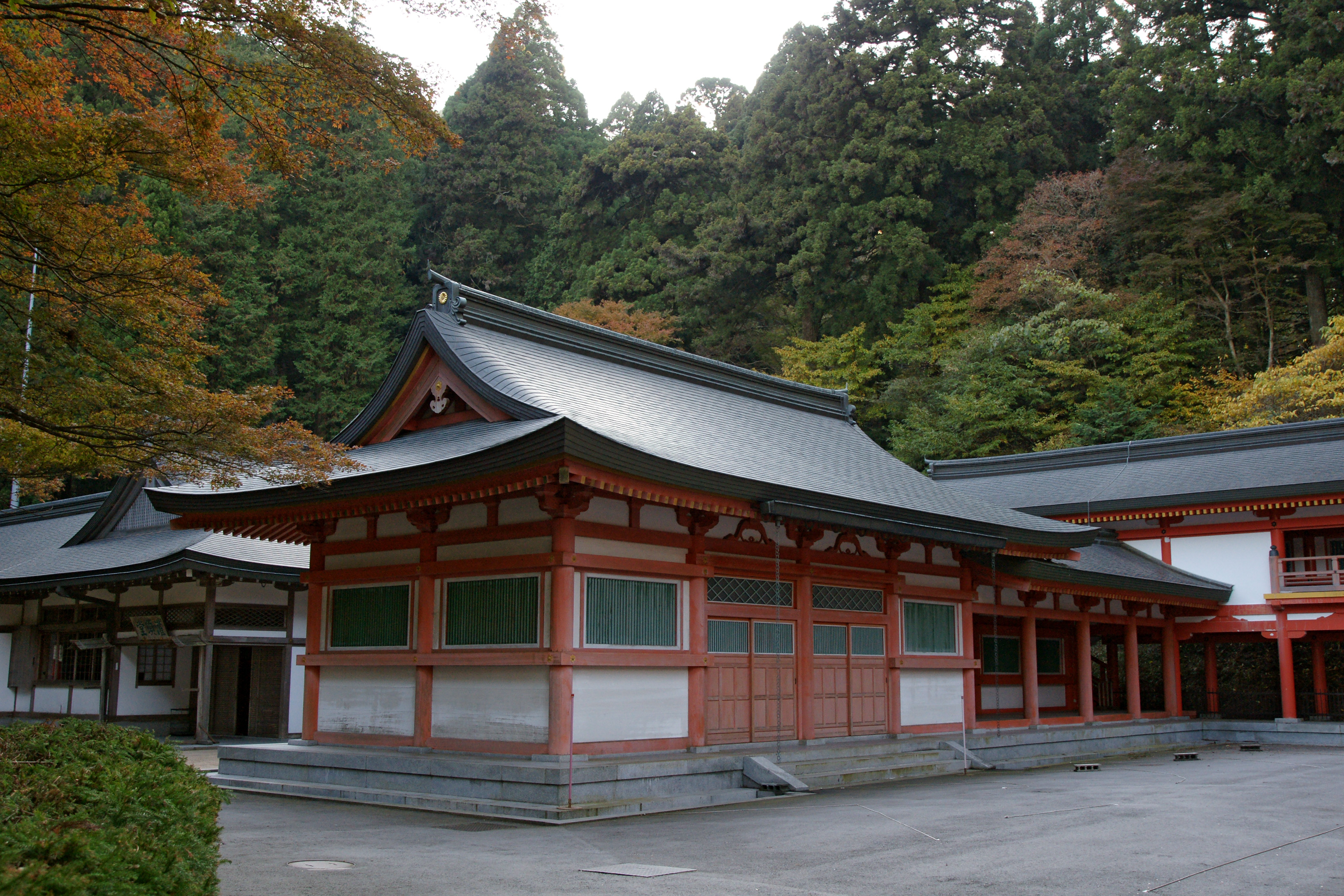
Hall of Initiation (灌頂堂, Kanjō-dō)

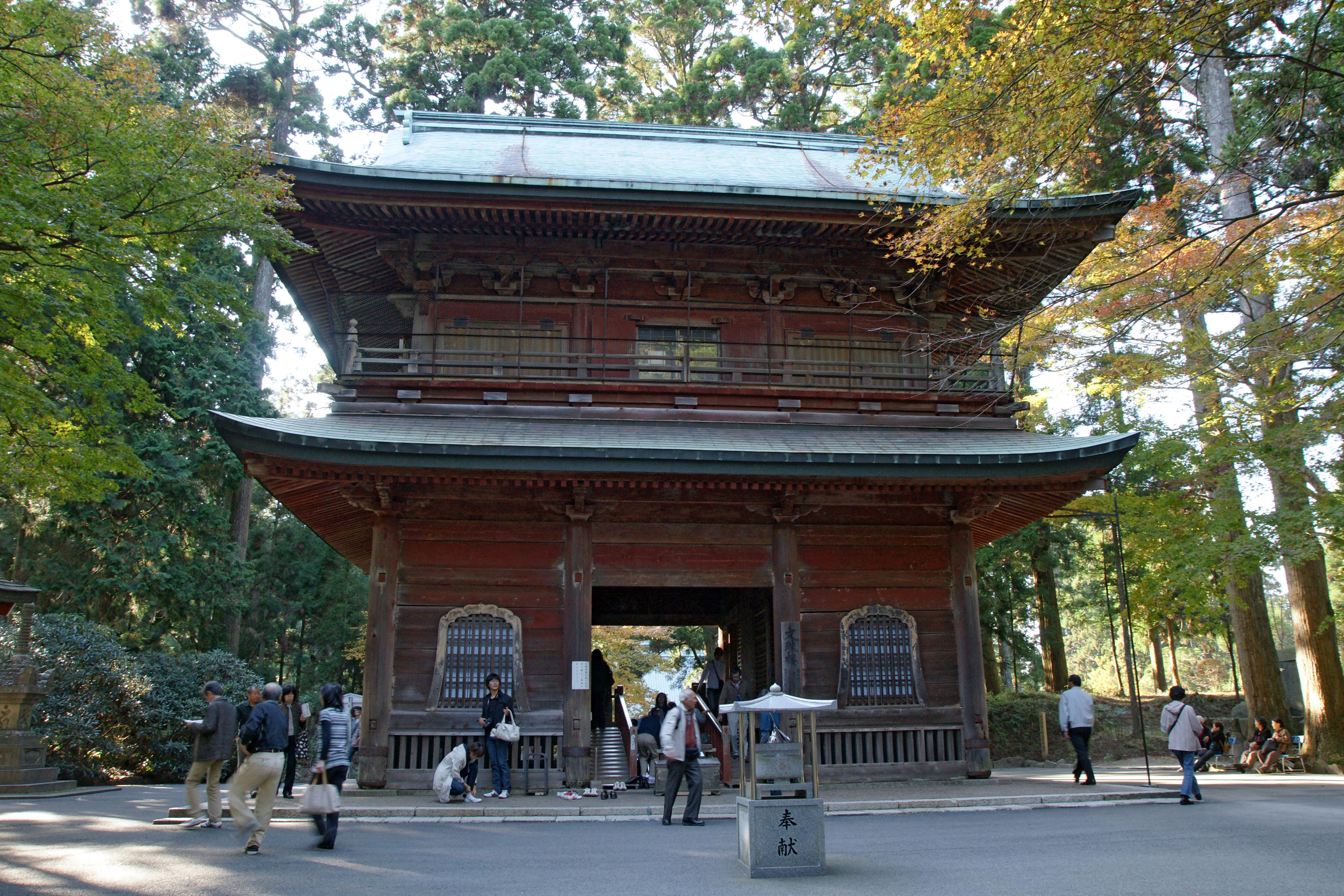
Monju-rō gate (文殊楼, Monju-rō)

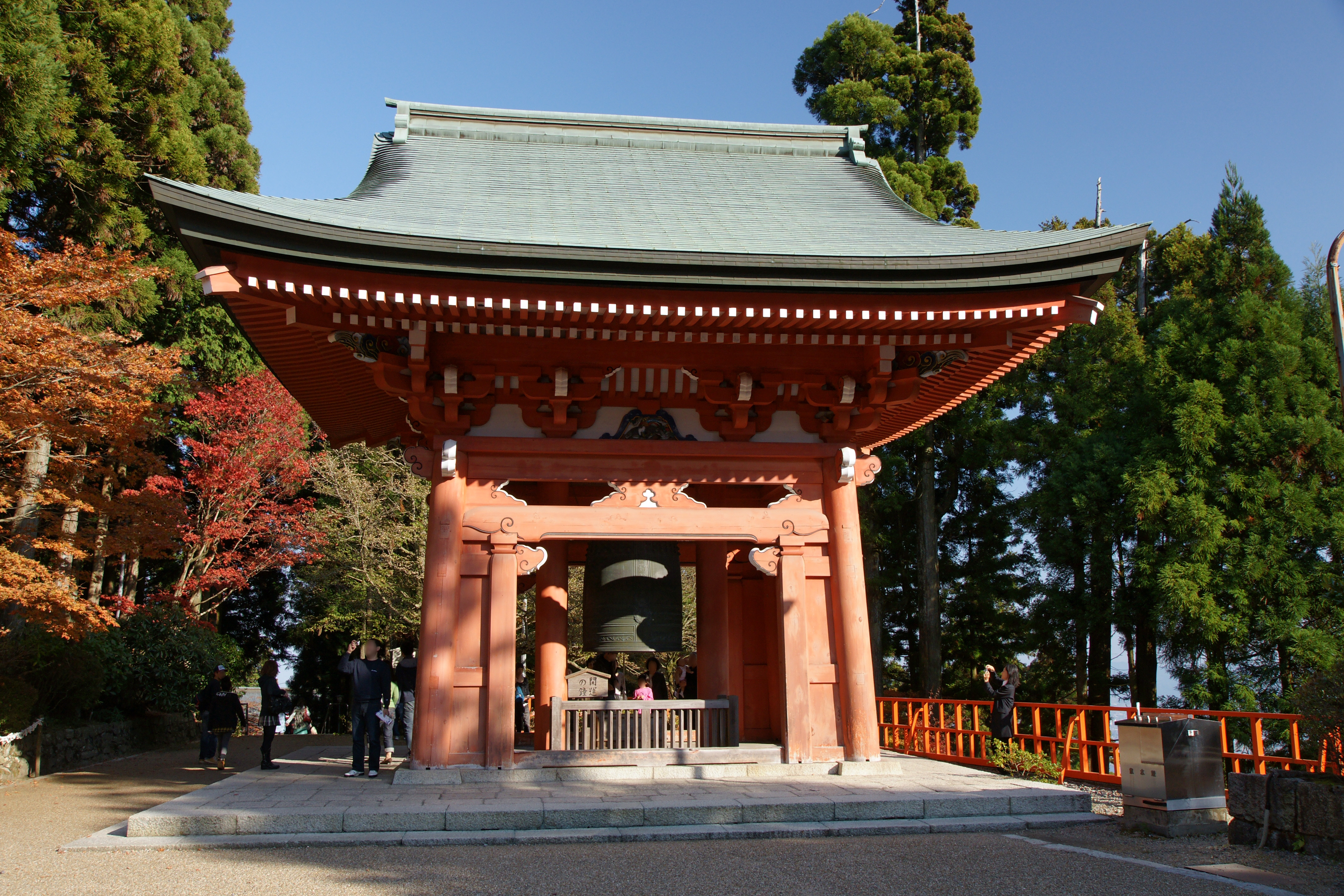
Bell Tower (鐘楼, Shōrō)

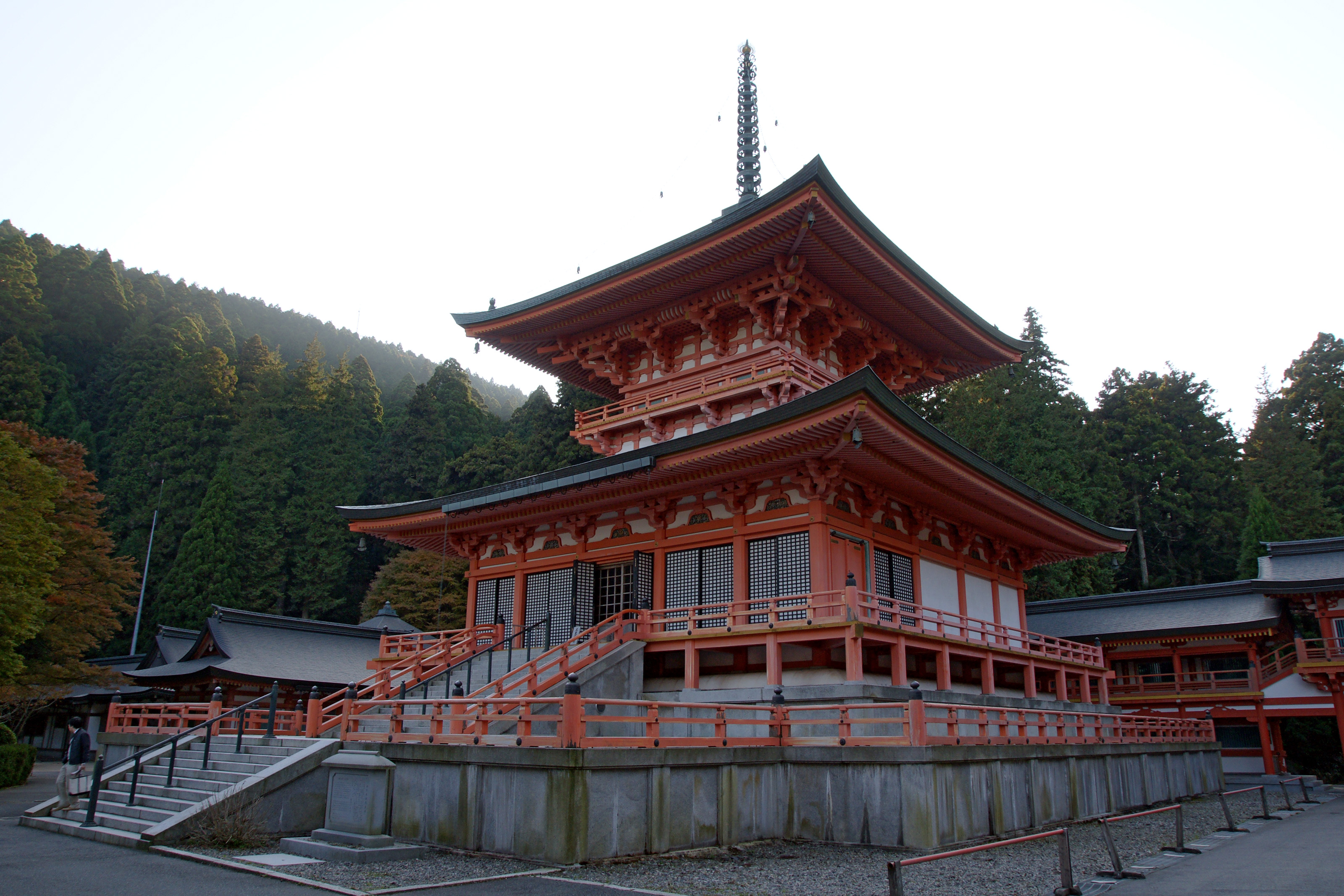
East Pagoda (東塔, Tō-tō)

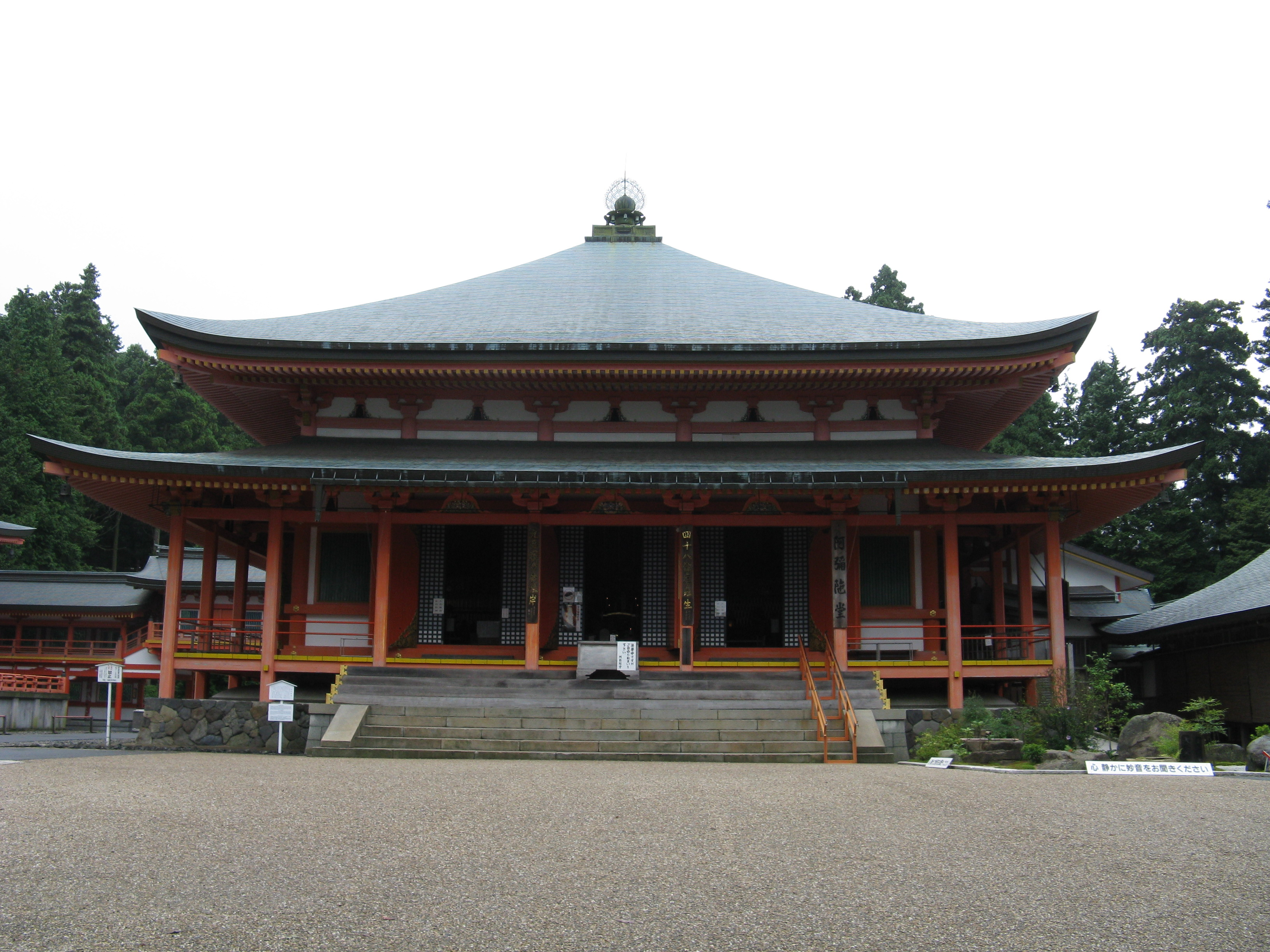
Amida Hall (阿弥陀堂, Amida-dō)

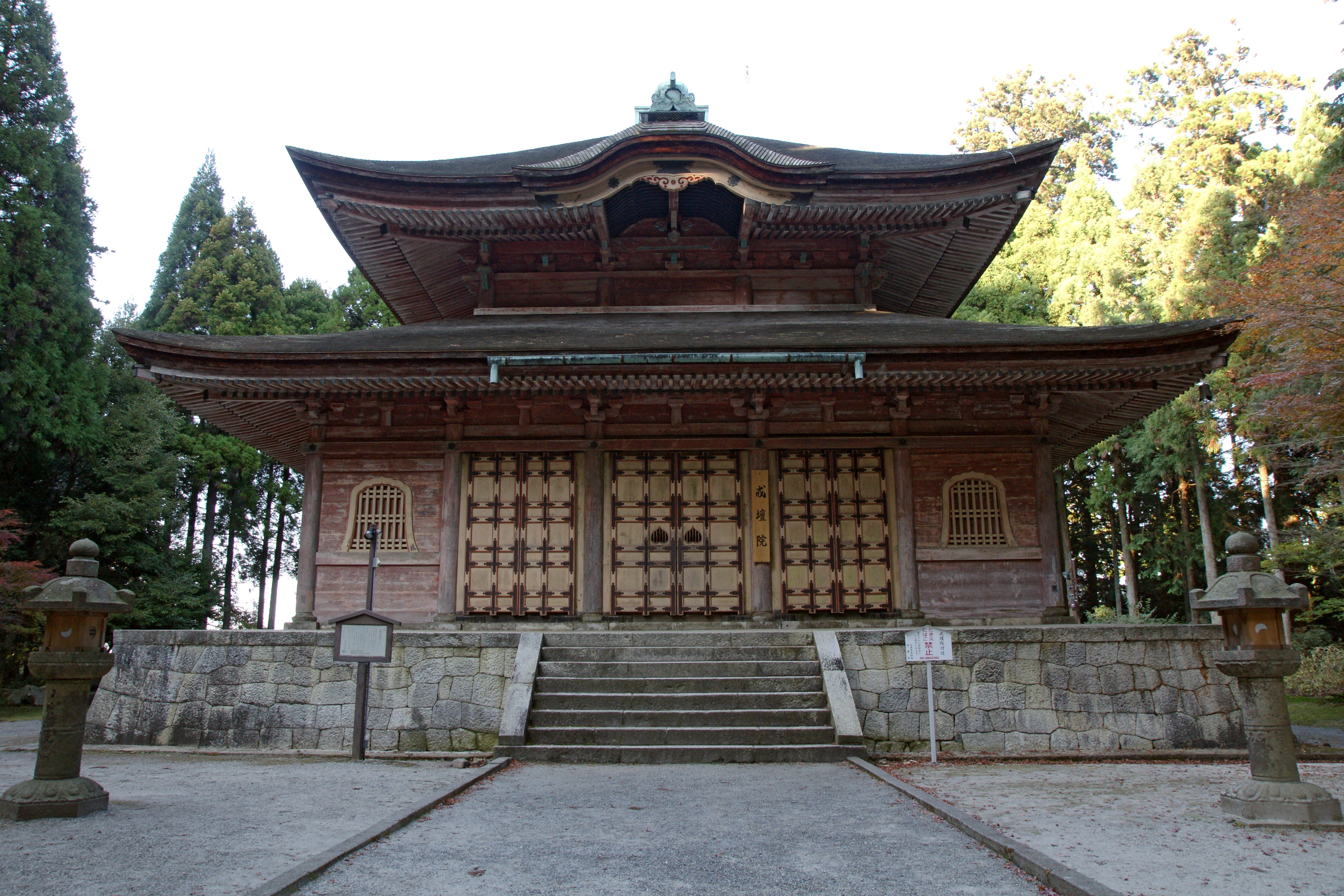
Ordination Hall (戒壇院, Kaidan-in)

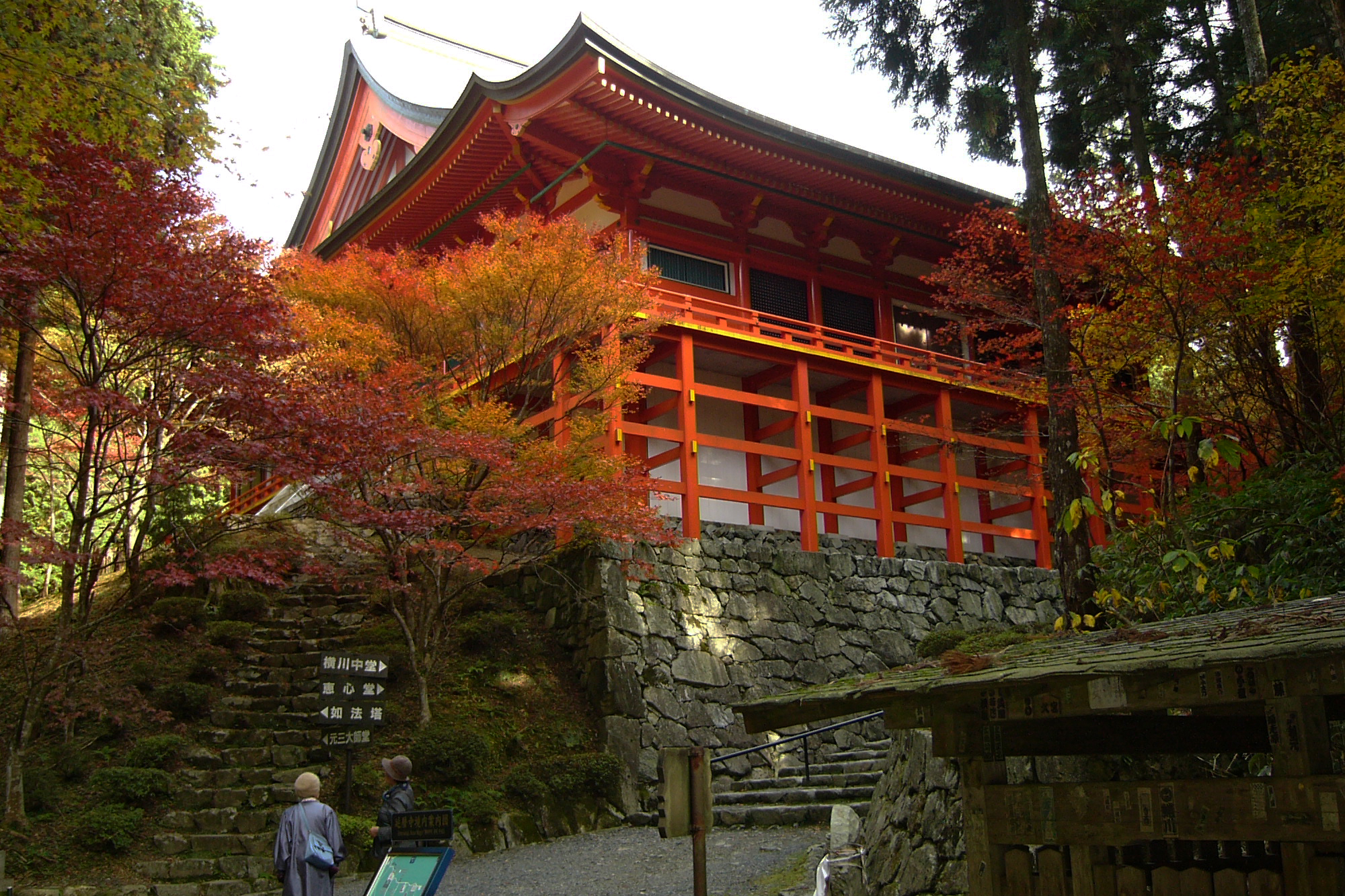
Yokawa Main Hall (横川中堂, Yokawa-chūdō)

== Gallery ==
Heiji Monogatari Emaki - Sanjo scroll

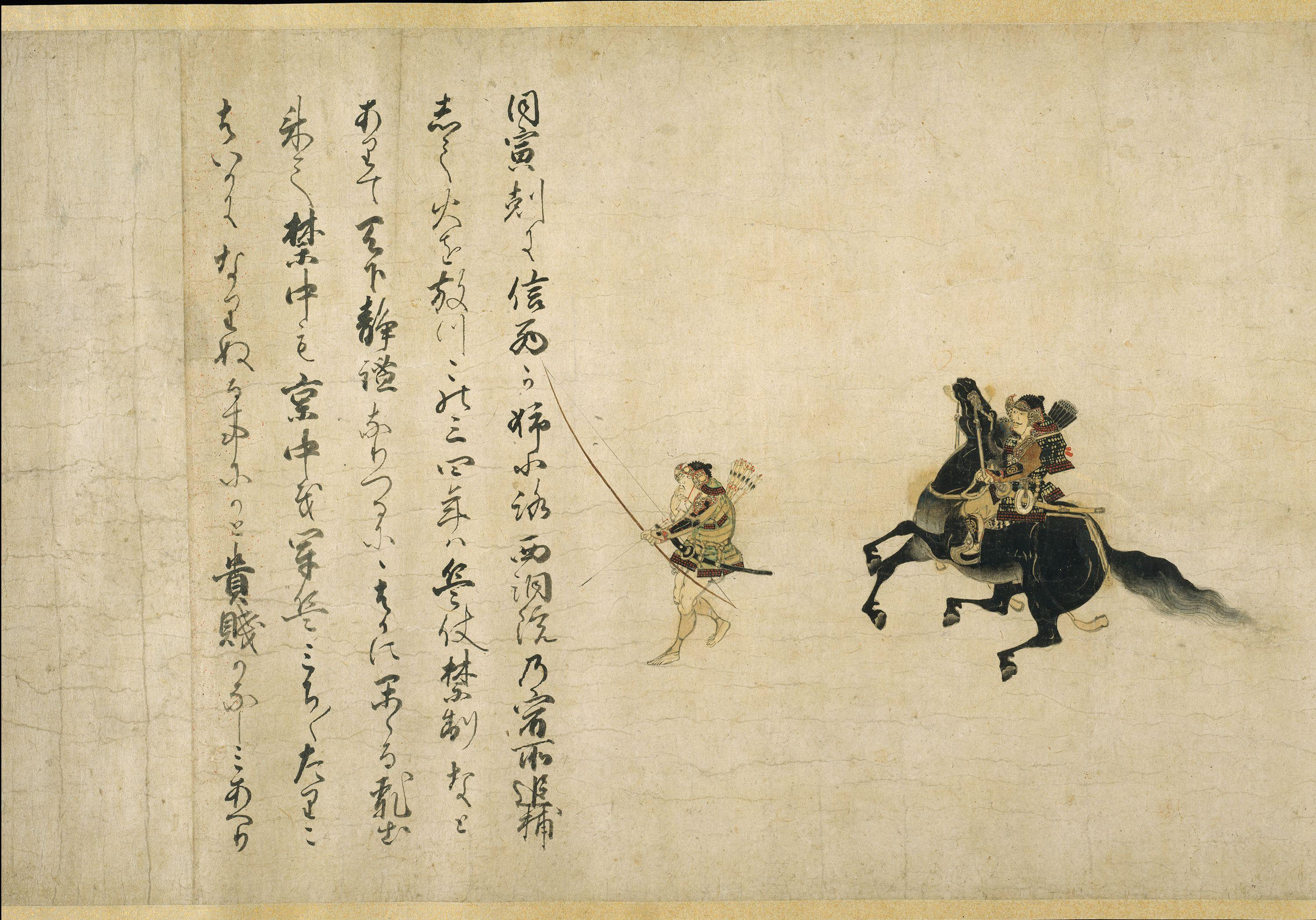

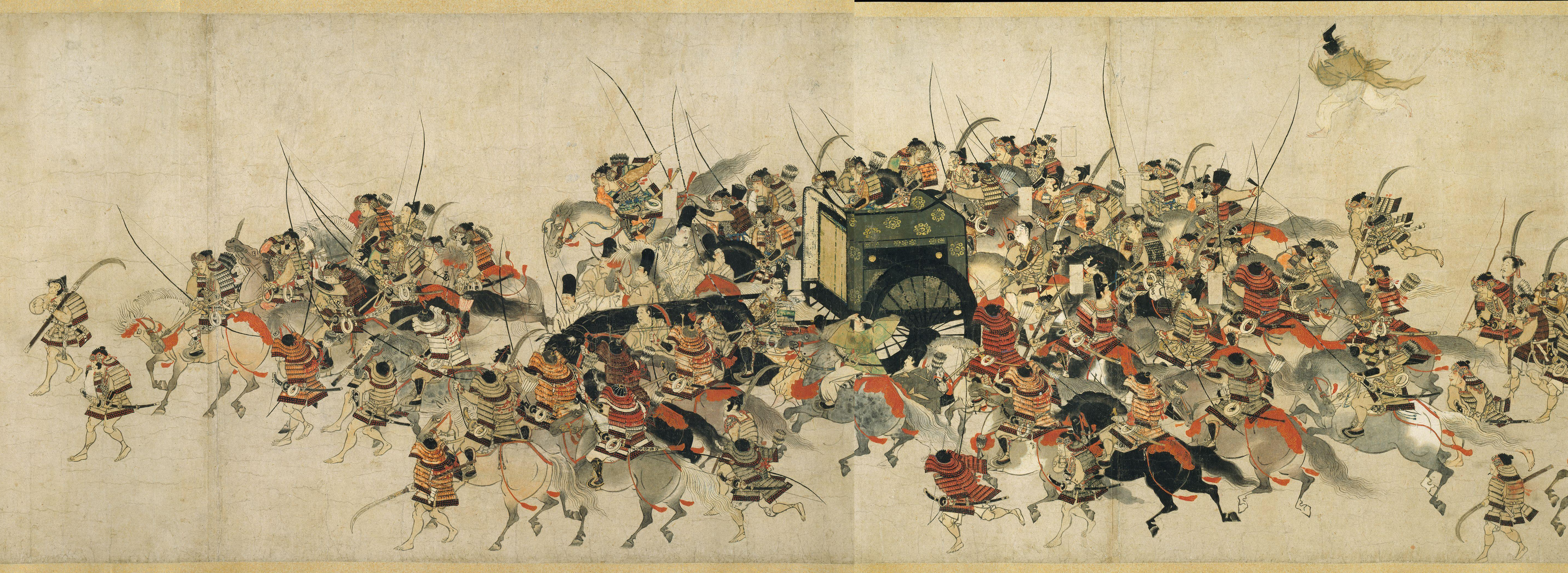

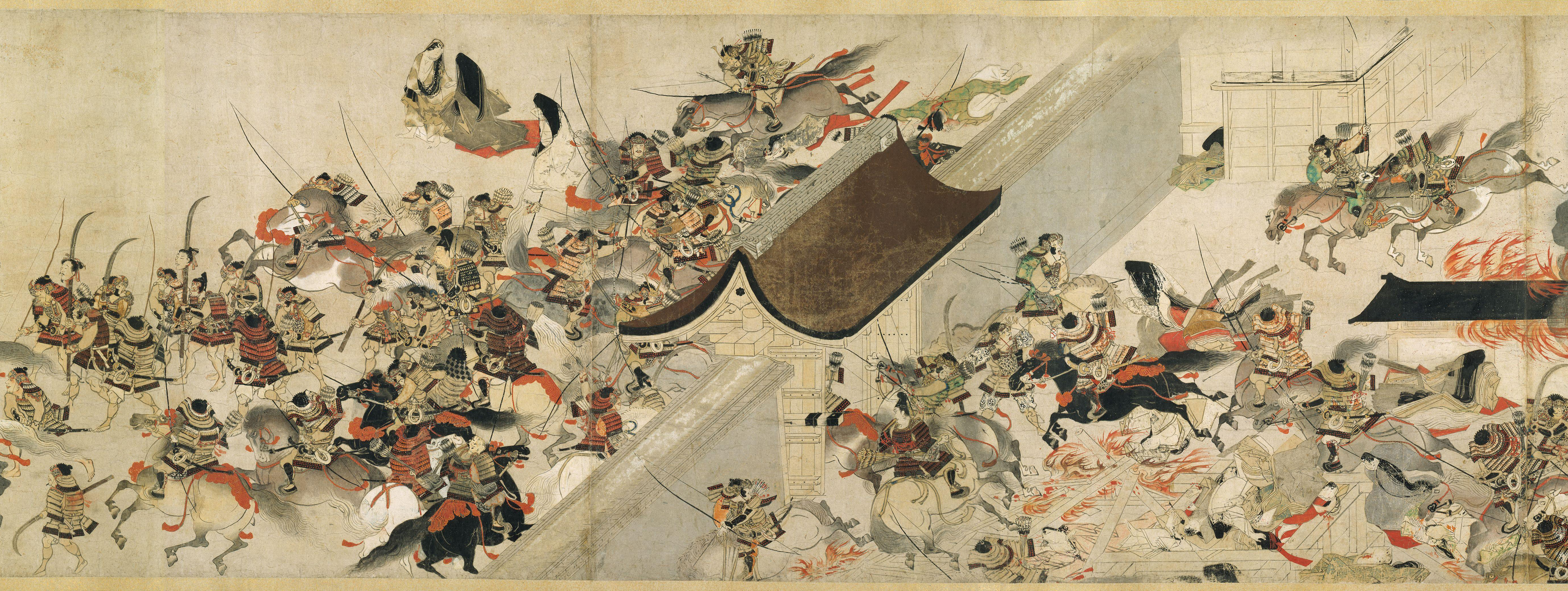

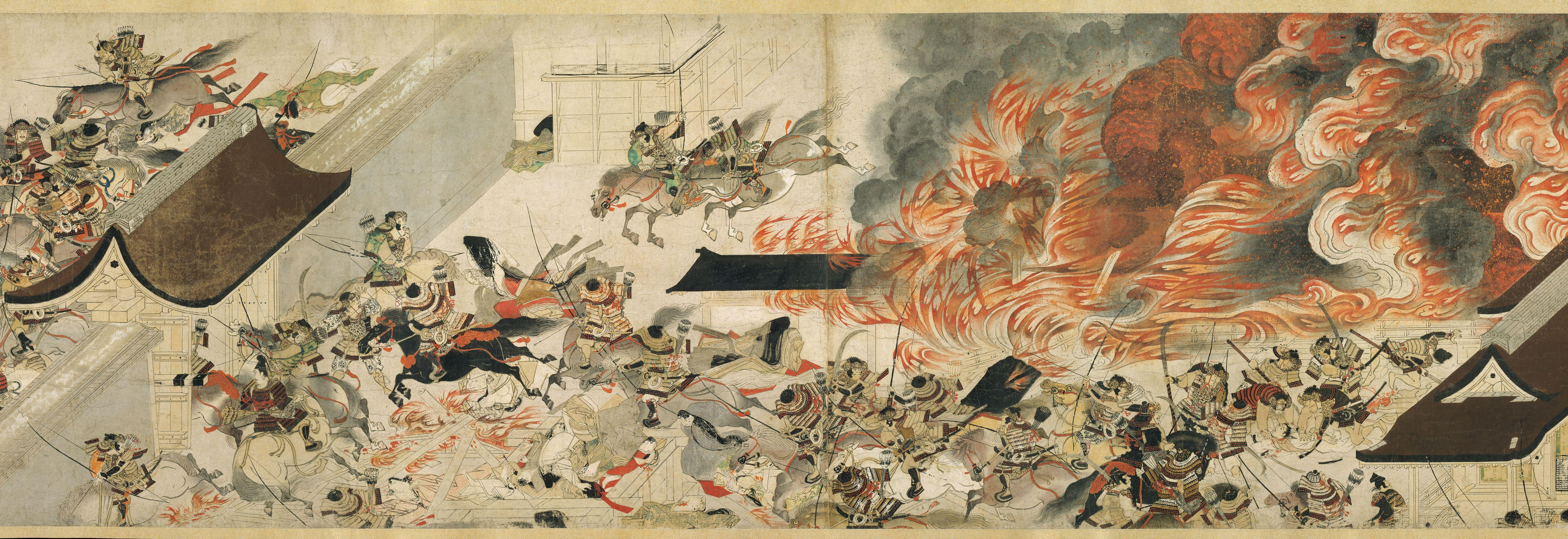

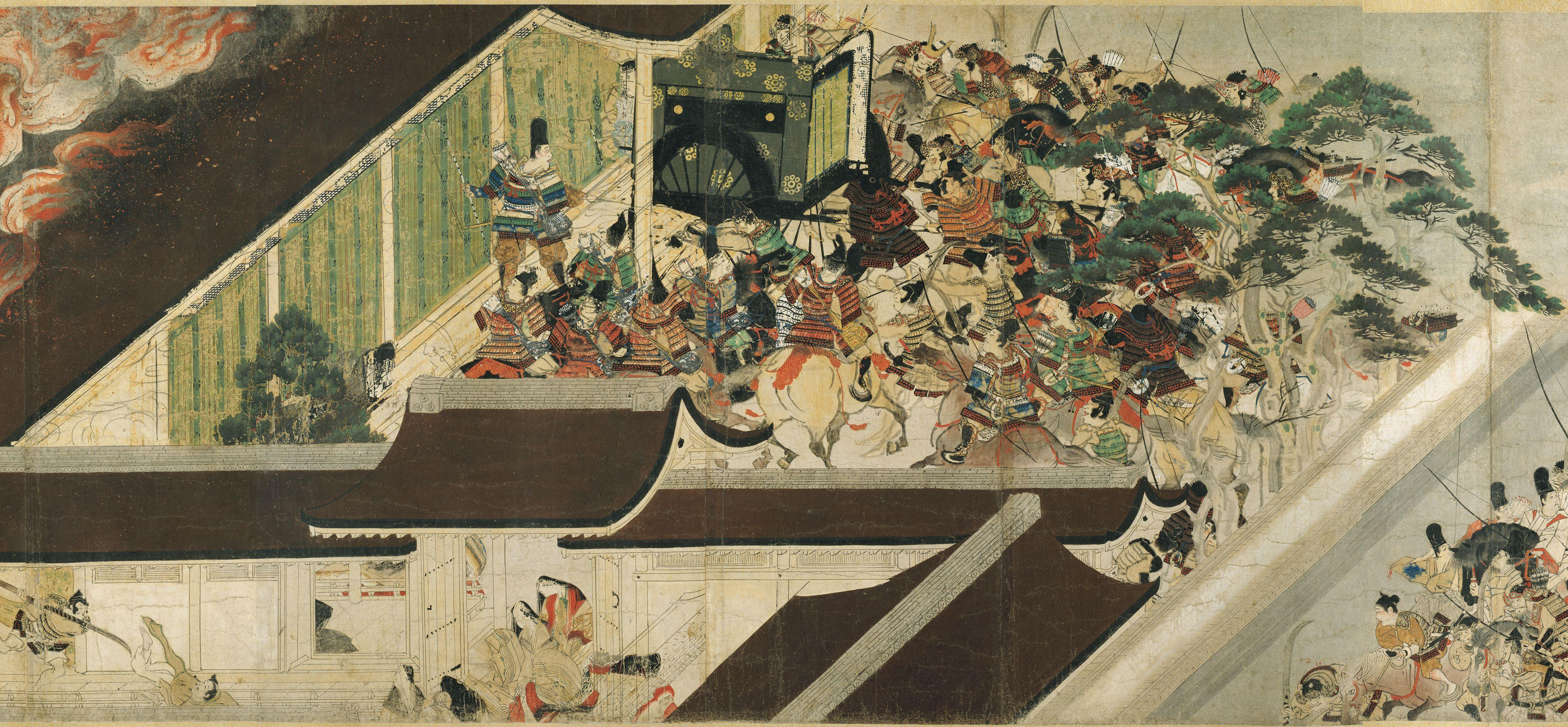

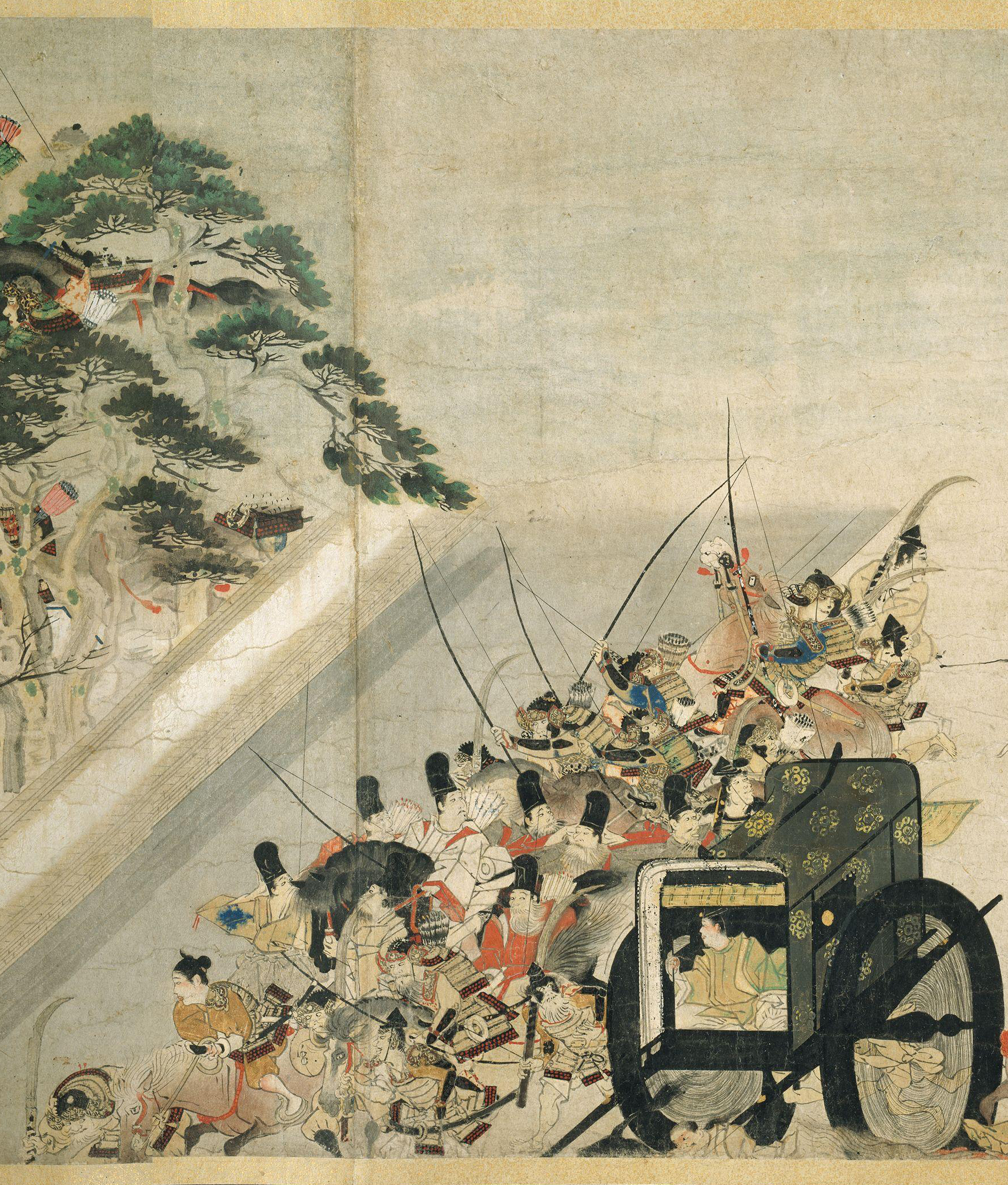

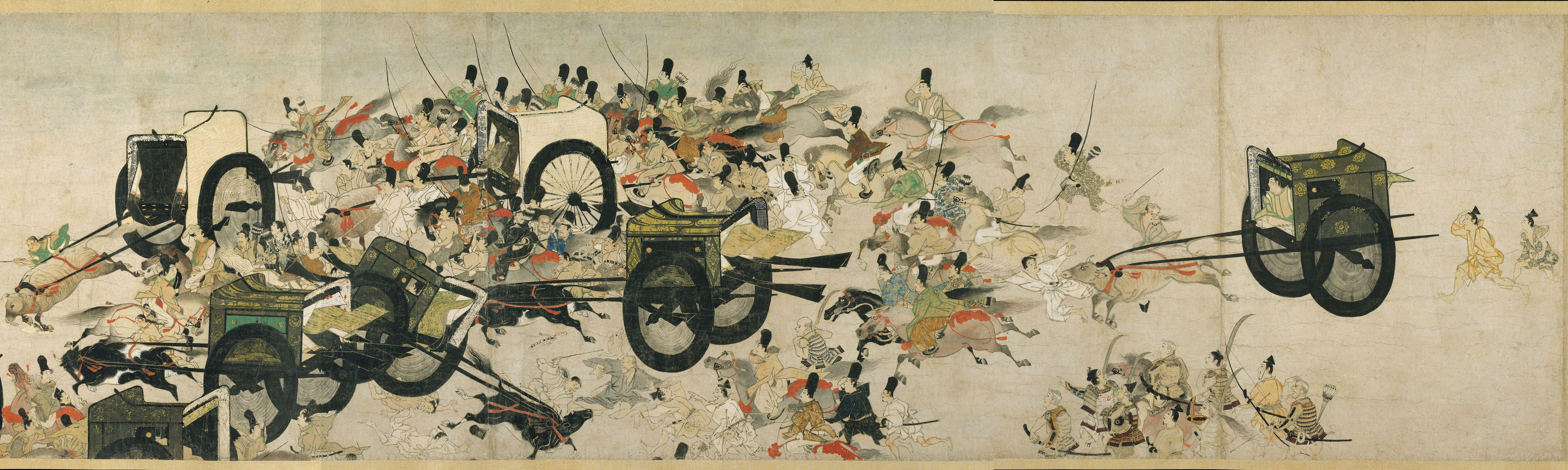

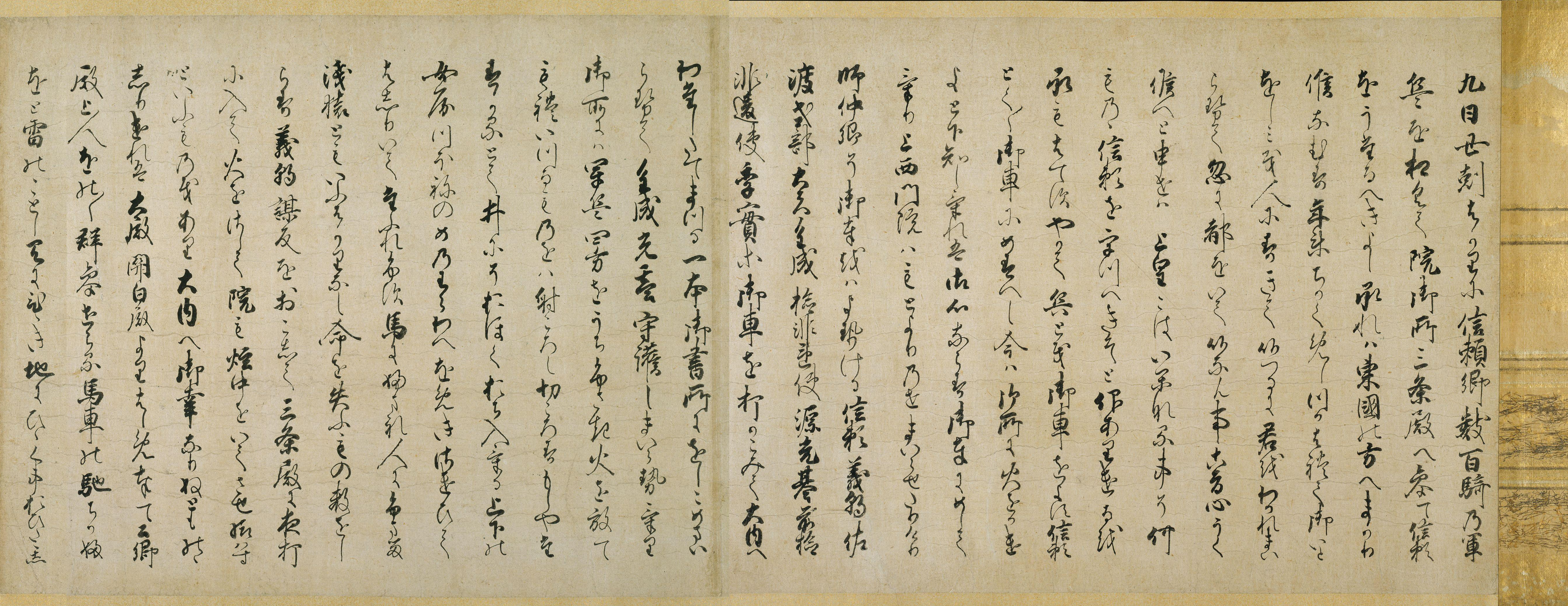

Heiji Monogatari Emaki - Shinzei Scroll

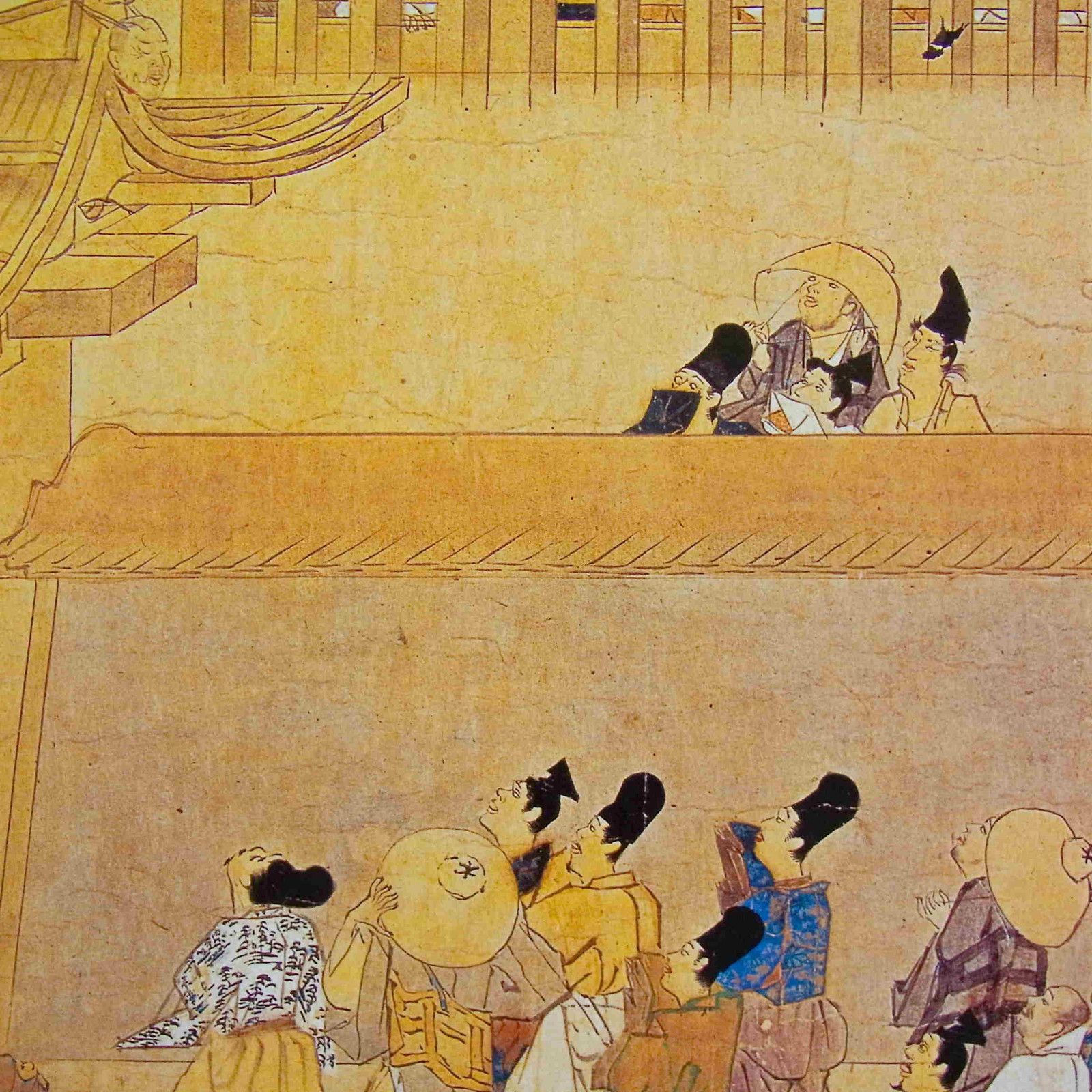

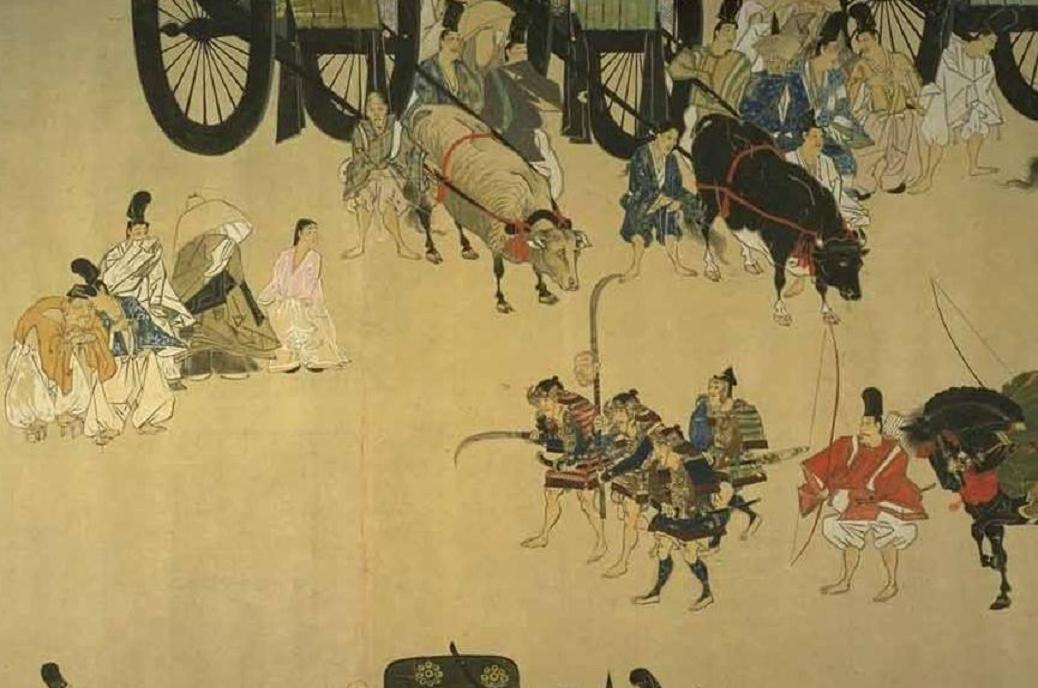

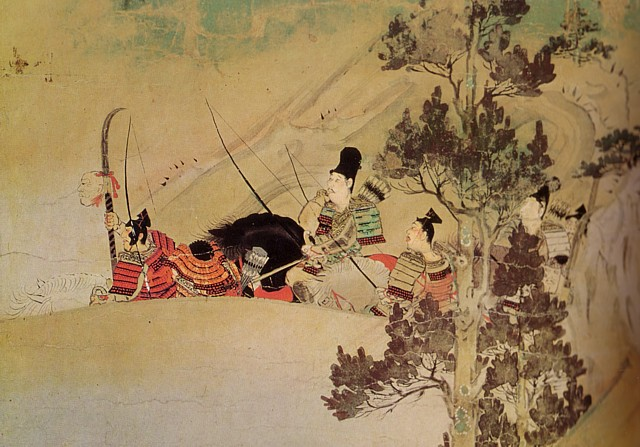

Heiji Monogatari Emaki - Rokuhara scroll

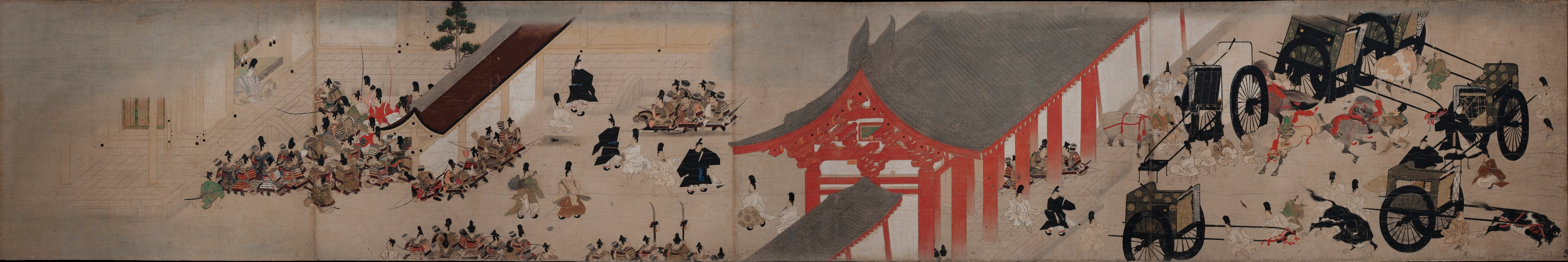

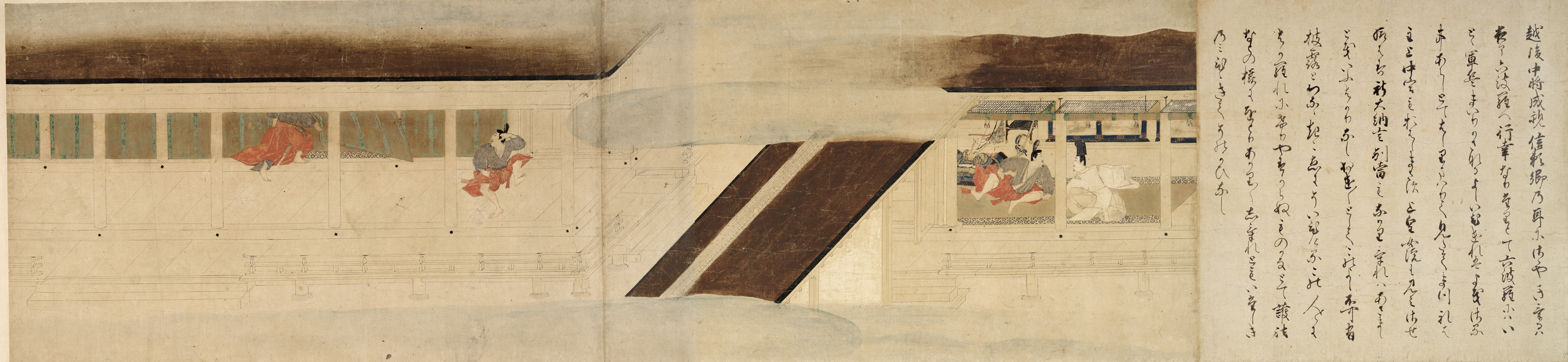

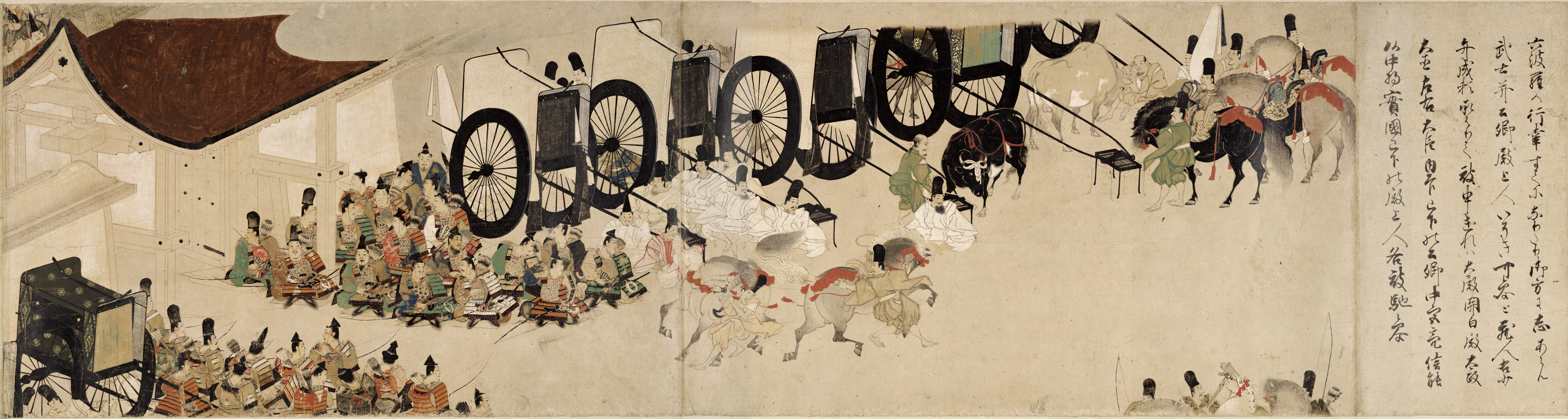

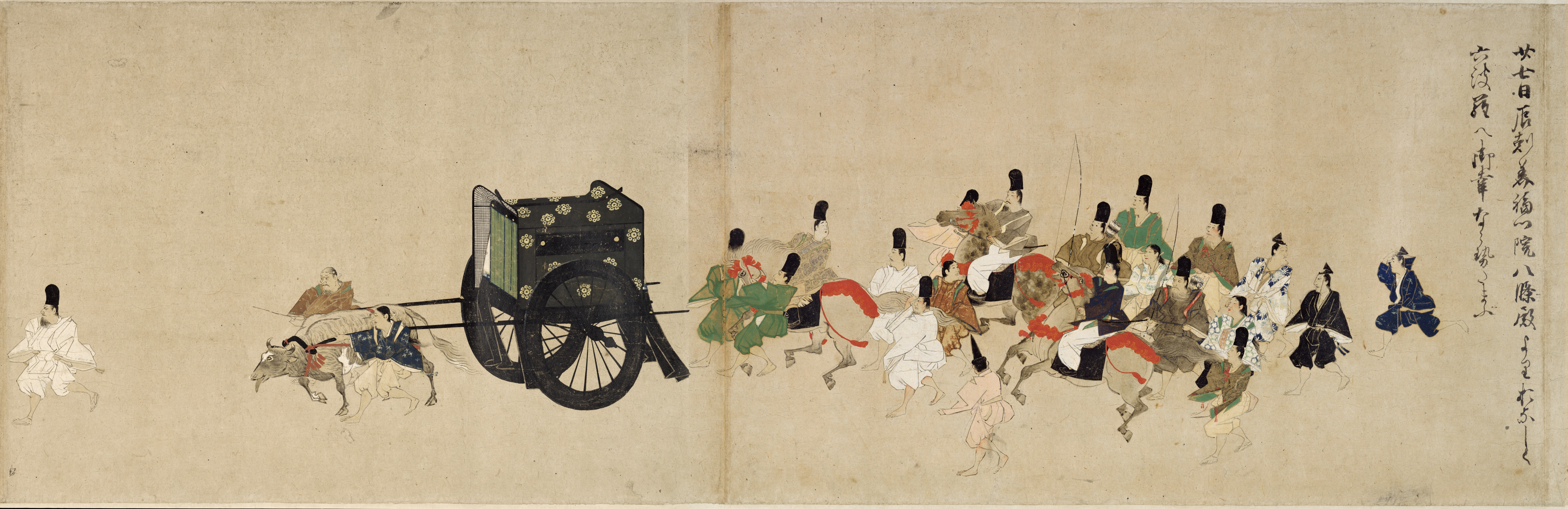

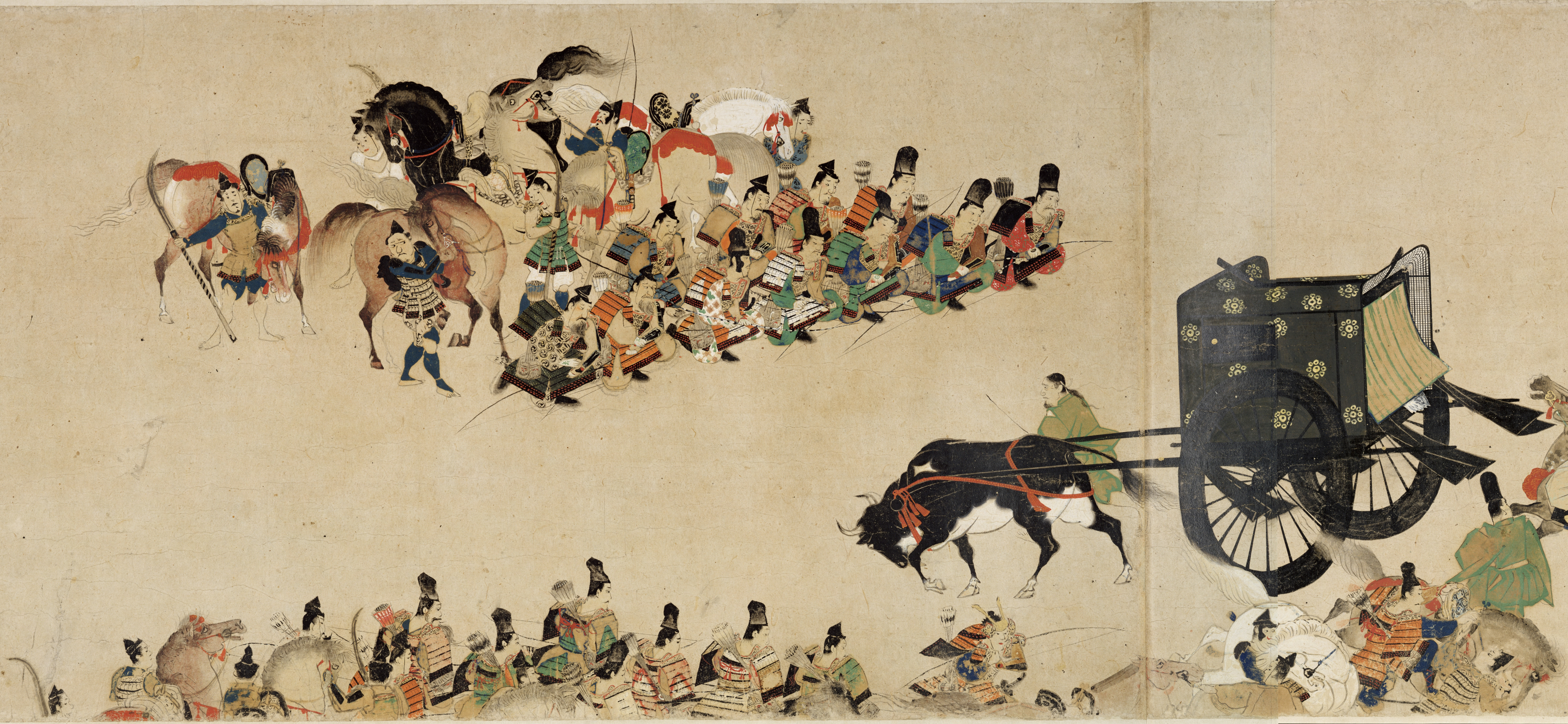

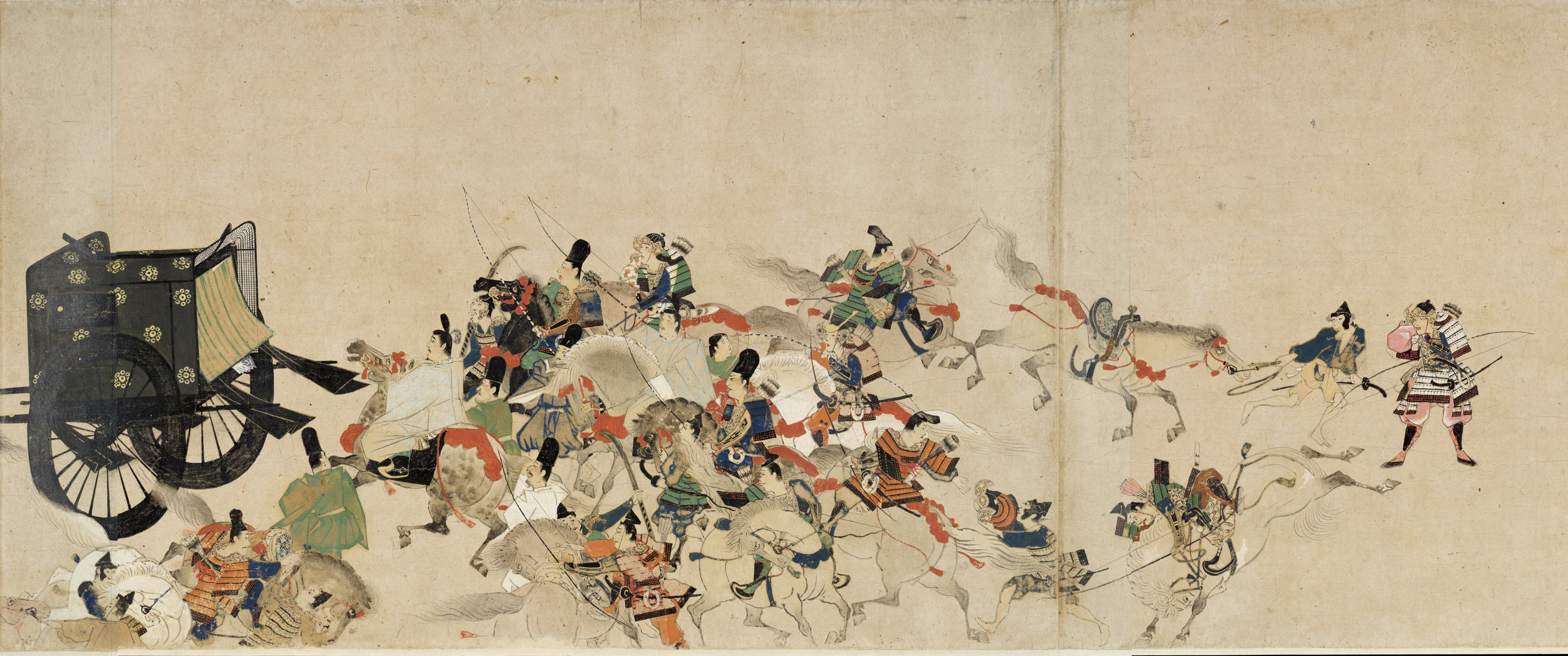

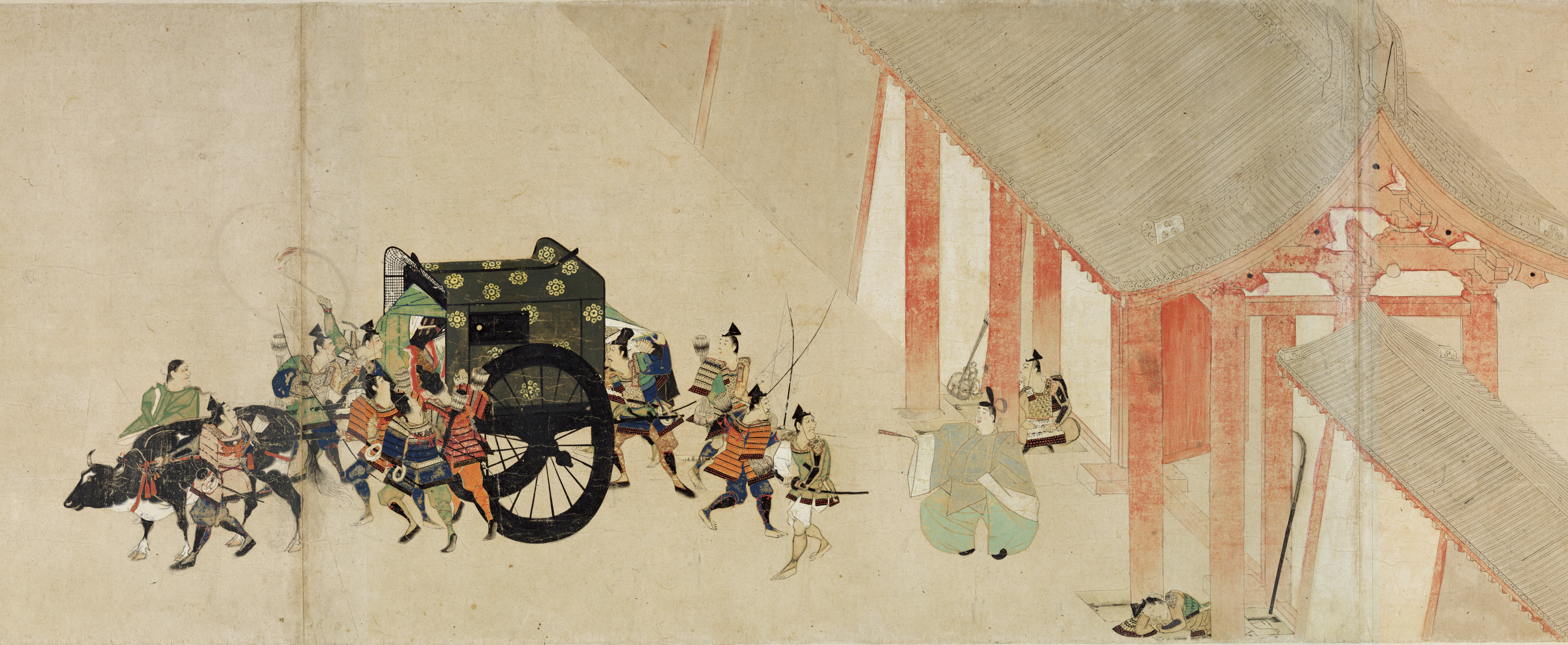

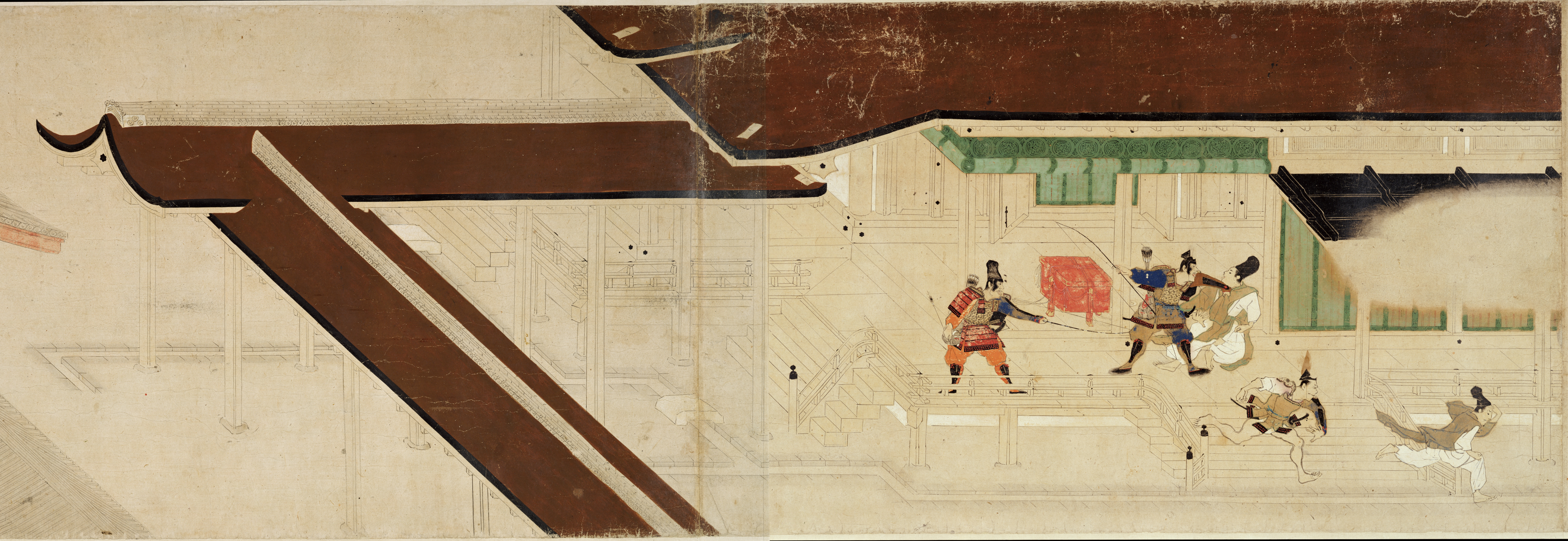

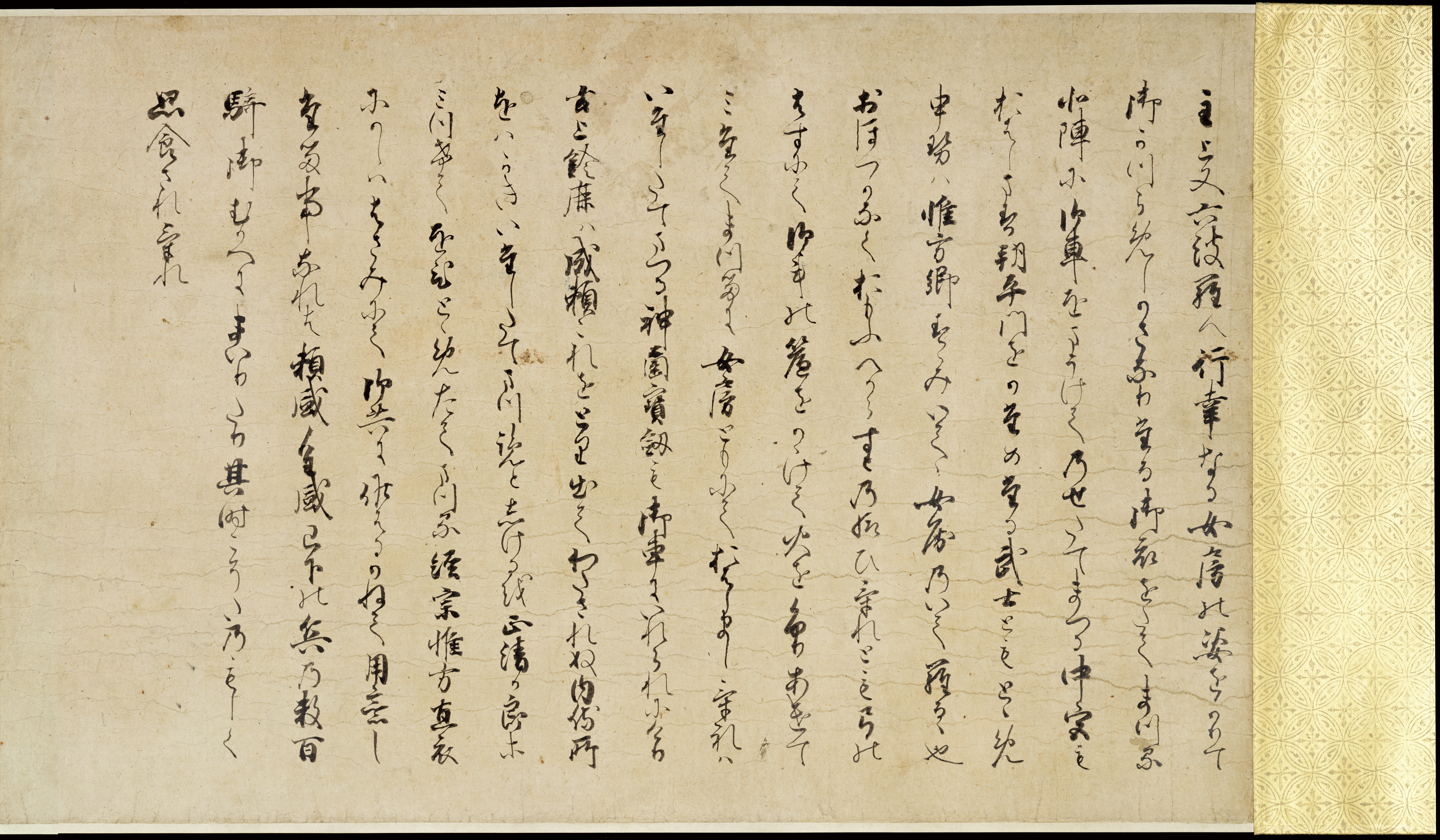

== See also ==
- Guoqing Temple
- Historic Monuments of Ancient Kyoto (Kyoto, Uji and Otsu Cities)
- List of Buddhist temples in Kyoto
- List of National Treasures of Japan (ancient documents)
- List of National Treasures of Japan (crafts-others)
- List of National Treasures of Japan (temples)
- List of National Treasures of Japan (writings)
- Tourism in Japan
