= Kanmaki, Osaka =

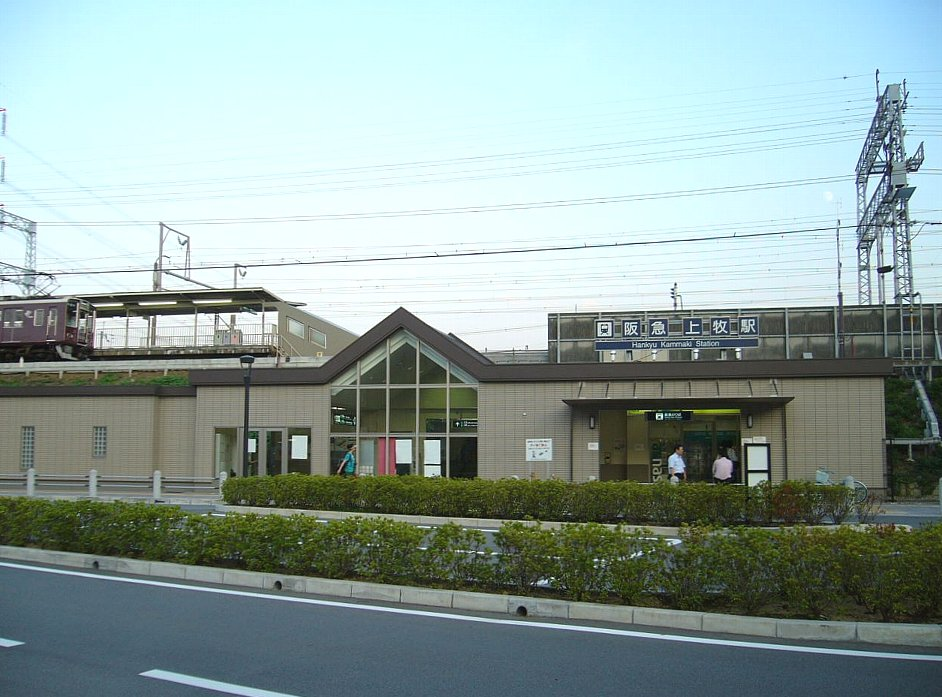
Kammaki Station

Kanmaki (上牧町, Kanmakichō) is a neighbourhood in the city of Takatsuki in Osaka Prefecture, Japan. It is known for having one of The 100 Views of Nature in Kansai, Udono no yoshihara (鵜殿のヨシ原).

== Geography ==
Kanmaki is positioned between Mount Tennōzan and the Yodo River.

== History ==
Kanmaki was historically significant as a place where high quality yoshi, a type of reed, was collected for the production of traditional Japanese instruments、in particular the Shō (instrument). Every February, a yoshiharayaki (reed burning) festival is held at "Udono no yoshi gen".

== Transport ==
Kanmaki is close to Kammaki Station on the Hankyu Kyoto Line.

== Education ==
- Takatsuki Municipal Kanmaki Kindergarten
- Takatsuki Municipal Kanmaki Elementary School

== Shrines and temples ==
- Kasuga Shrine
- Honchō-ji Temple
