= Sakurai-no-eki =

Sakurai-no-eki Site
- 桜井駅跡 (Japanese)
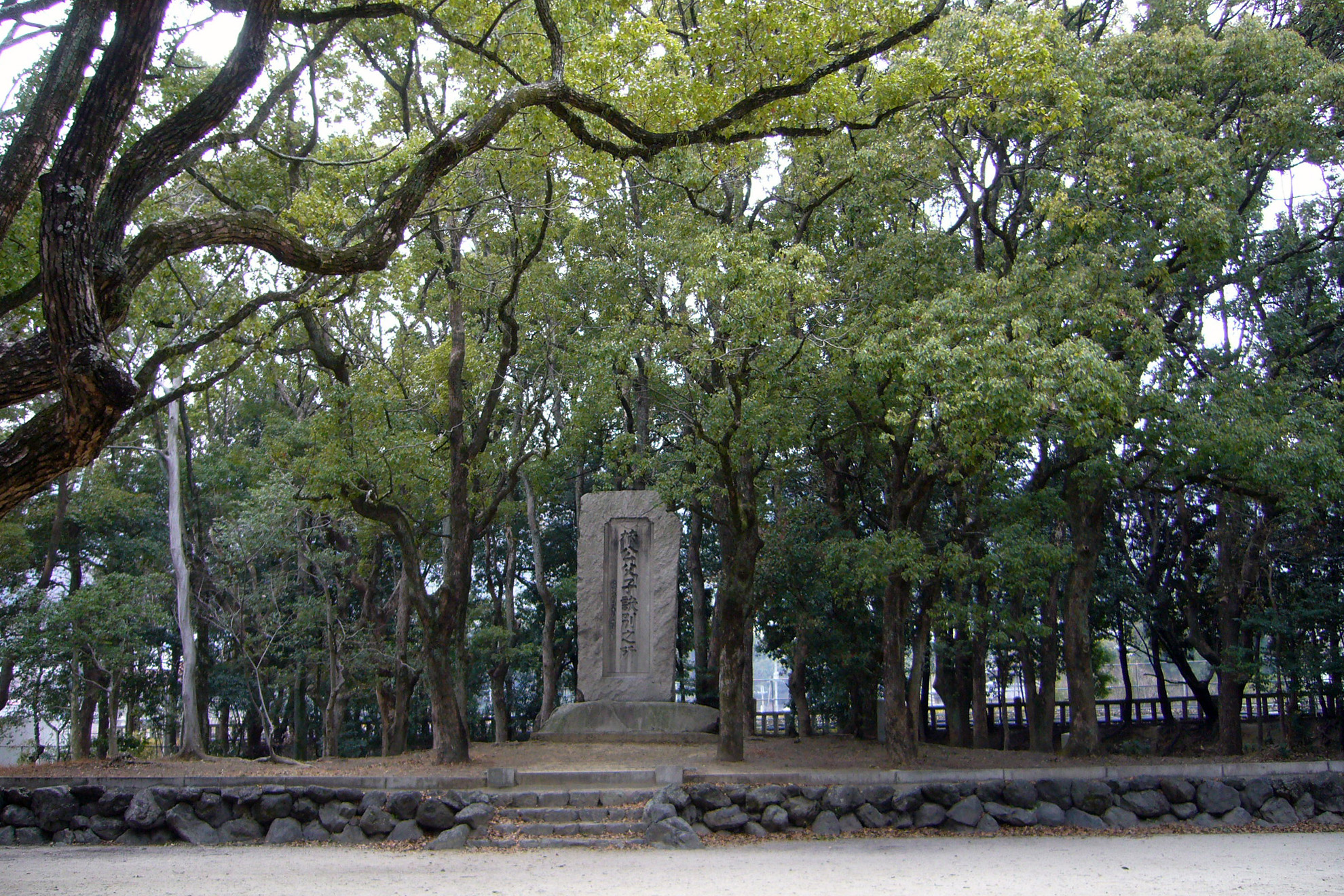
- Monument by Nogi Maresuke

- Sakurai-no-eki Site Sakurai-no-eki (Japan)
- Interactive map of Sakurai-no-eki Site
- 34°52′52″N 135°39′49.7″E
- Location: Shimamoto, Osaka, Japan
- Region: Kansai region

History
- Built: c.8th century

Site notes
- Public access: Yes (park)

The Sakurai-no-eki (桜井駅) was a post station on the ancient Saigoku kaidō highway in what is now the Sakurai neighborhood of the town of Shimamoto, Osaka in the Kansai region of Japan. It is noted for its connection to the imperial loyalist Kusunoki Masashige and was designated a National Historic Site in 1921.

== Overview ==
The Sakurai post station was an umaya, or horse station, on the Saigoku kaidō, the official government highway connecting Heian-kyō with Shimonoseki. Established by the Taika Reforms, such stations were located approximately every 30 ri (about 16 kilometers) along the route. Per Volume 5 of the Shoku Nihongi, under an entry for the year 711, "Ohara Station, Shimakami County, Settsu Province" was created on the route between Kyoto and Nishinomiya, and it is believed that this location corresponds to the Sakurai post station.

This was the location in Volume 16 of the Taiheiki where Kusunoki Masahige, en route to his death at the Battle of Minatogawa against the forces of Ashikaga Takauji, parted ways with his son Kusunoki Masatsura, whom he ordered to Kawachi Province. The events of the Taiheiki were greatly romanticized and promoted by the Meiji government and pre-war Japanese nationalists, who drew parallels between the Kenmu restoration and the Meiji restoration 550 years later. In November 1876, the British ambassador to Japan, Sir Harry Parkes erected a stone monument on this site commemorating Kusunoki Masashige, and further monuments were erected by General Nogi Maresuke in 1913 and Fleet Admiral Tōgō Heihachirō in 1931.

In 2008, Shimamoto Station on the Tokaido Main Line opened nearby. Previous to this, plans had been proposed to construct a train station near this location many times. Minase Station and Kammaki Station on the Hankyu Kyoto Line were originally opened under the names "Sakurai-no-eki eki" and "Kanmaki Sakurai-no-eki eki", respectively. The site of the Sakurai post station is now a park.

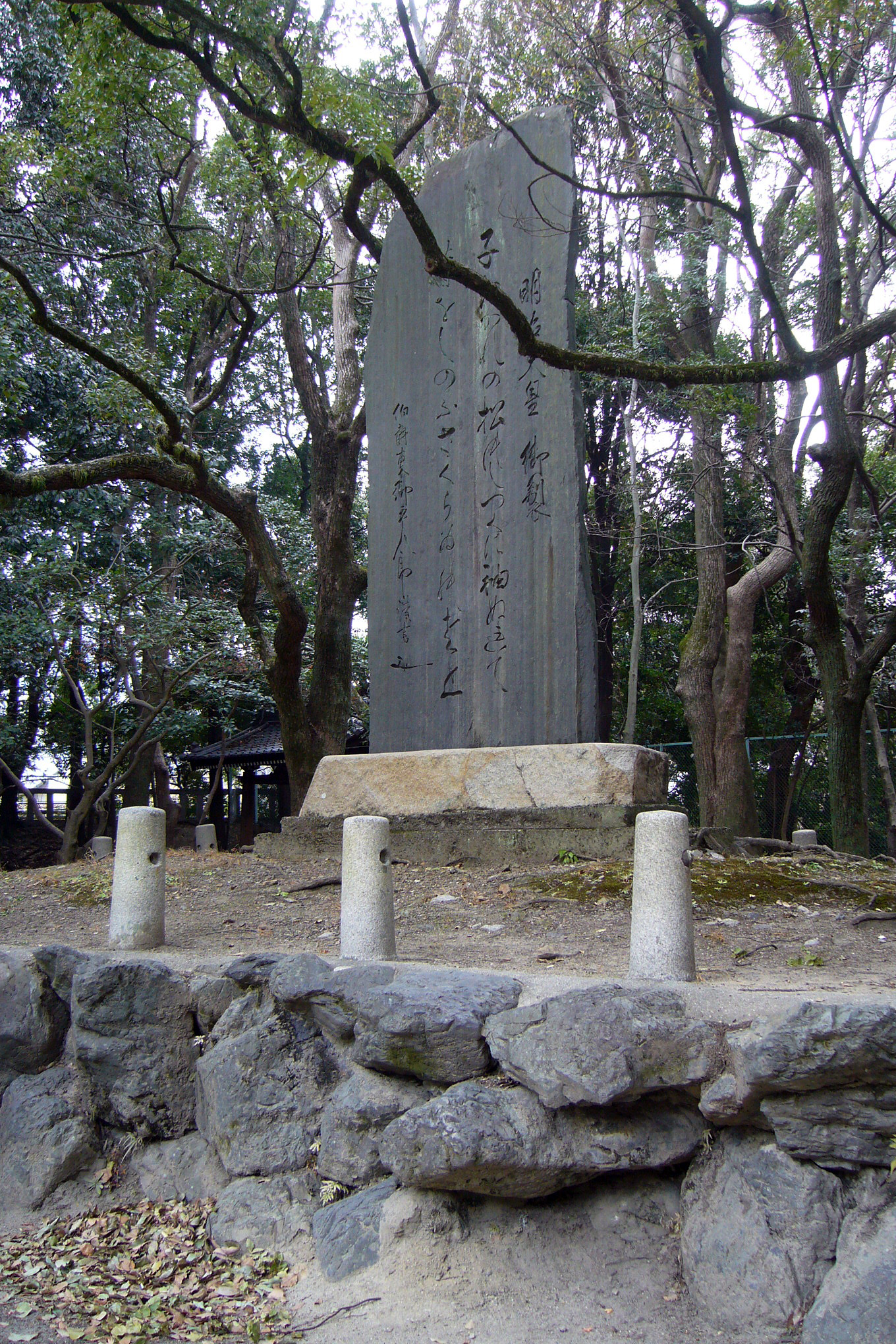
Monument by Tōgō Heihachirō

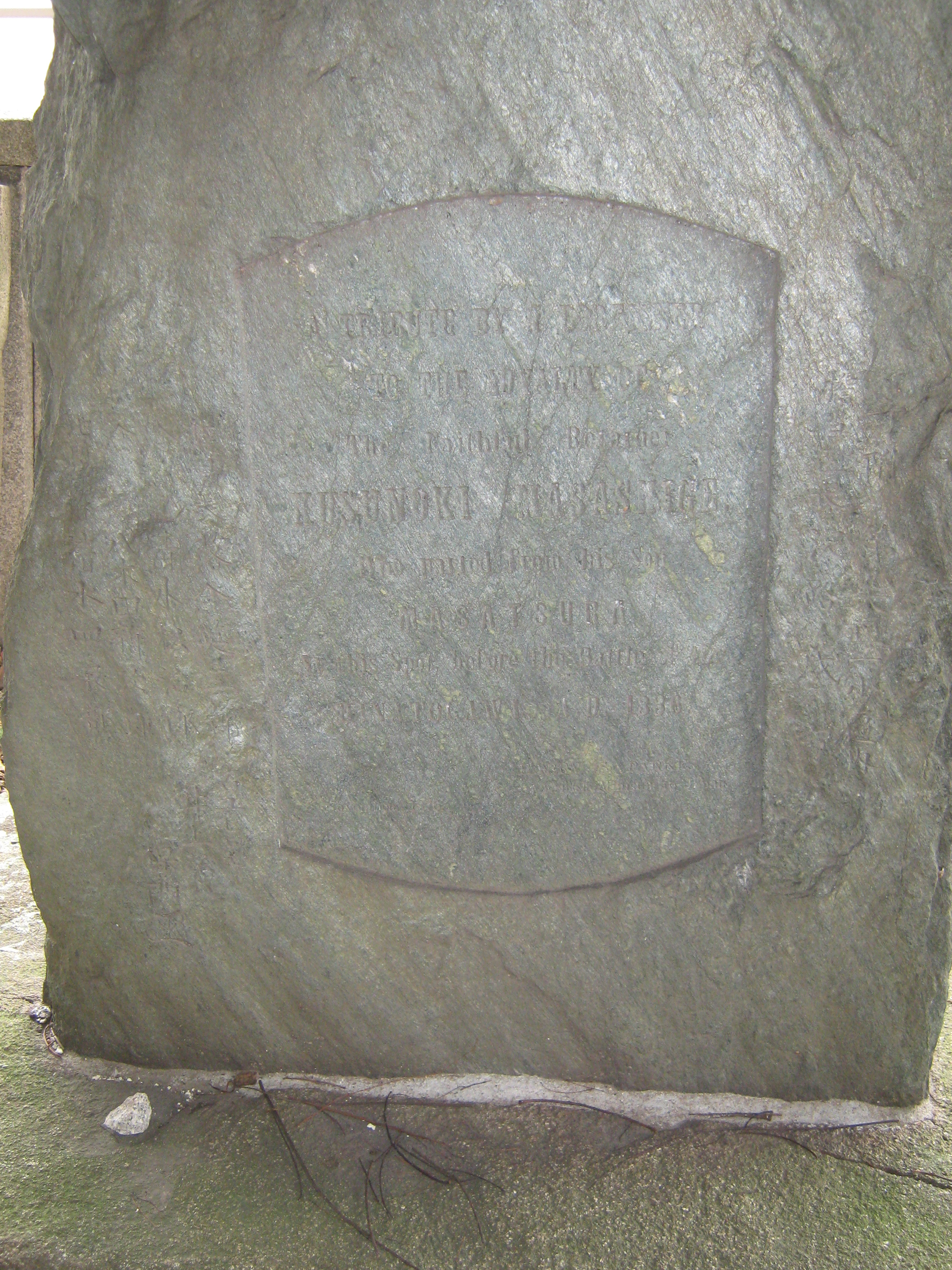
Monument by Sir Harry Parkes

== See also ==
- List of Historic Sites of Japan (Osaka)
