= Ise Sadaoki =

Samurai (1559–1582)

- 伊勢 貞興
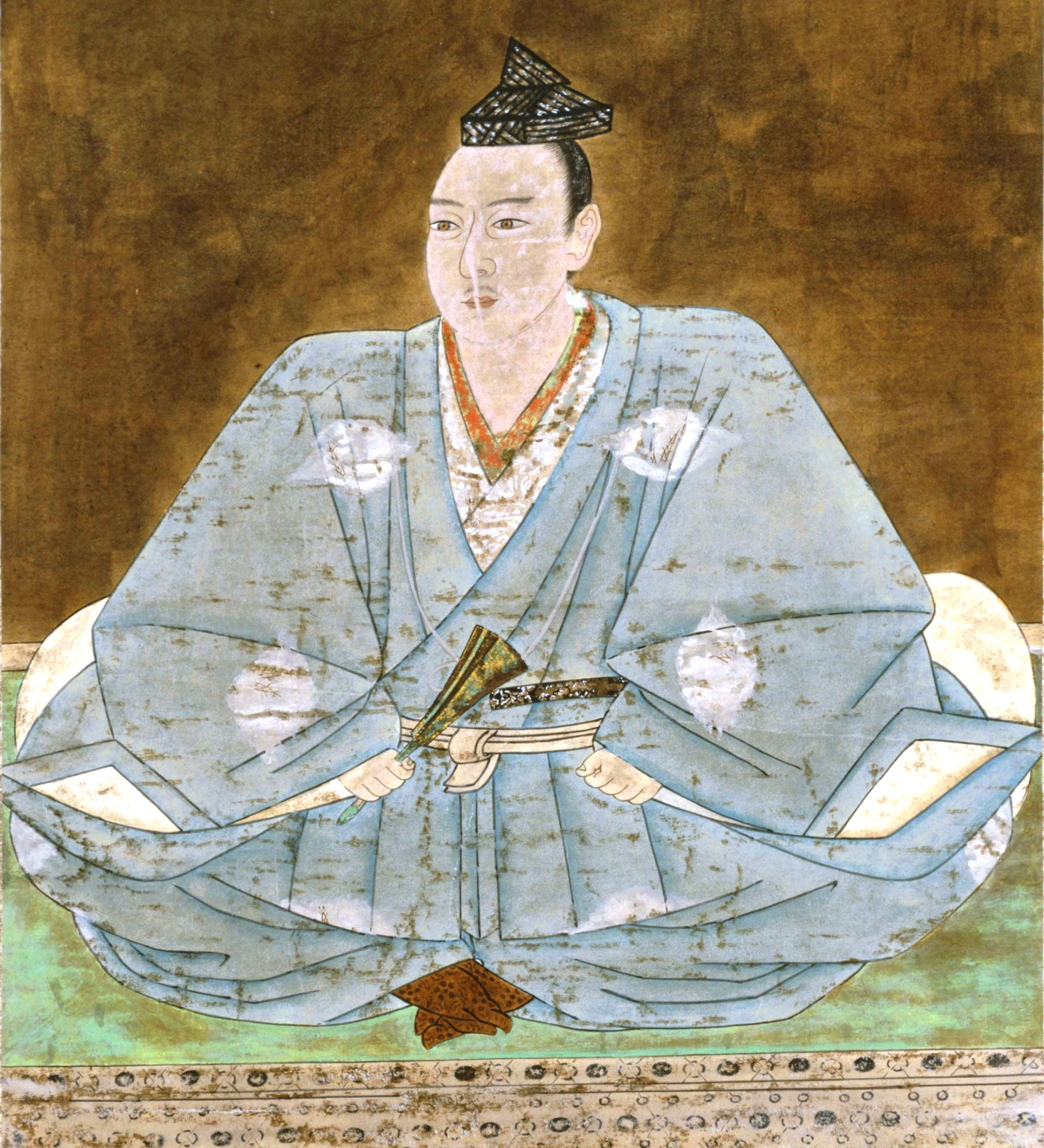
- Born: 1559
- Died: July 2, 1582 (aged 22–23); Battle of Yamazaki
- Military career
- Allegiance: Akechi clan
- Rank: Yoriki
- Conflicts: Tanba Campaign (1578); Honnoji Incident (1582); Battle of Yamazaki (1582)

Ise Sadaoki (伊勢 貞興; 1559 – July 2, 1582) was a samurai, and retainer of the Akechi clan following the Sengoku to Azuchi–Momoyama periods of the 16th century Japan. Married to Akechi Mitsuhide's daughter, Sadaoki later served under Mitsuhide, then through him, Oda Nobunaga.

He took part at the Honnoji Incident, he attacked and conquered Oda Nobutada "Nijo-gosho Palace". But later, during the Battle of Yamasaki, he was defeated by the forces of Hashiba Hideyoshi. He died at the age of 23.

Sadaoki son, Ise Sadahira served the Tokugawa clan during the Edo period, and their offspring continued to serve as a "taishin hatamoto", a direct retainer of the Shogun family.
