= Mitsuyoshi =

- Gender: Male

Origin
- Origin: Japanese
- Meaning: Different meanings depending on the kanji used

Mitsuyoshi (written: 三厳, 光亮, 光慶, 光美, 光聖 or 光由) is a masculine Japanese given name. Notable people with the name include:

- Akechi Mitsuyoshi (明智 光慶; 1569–1582), Japanese samurai
- Mitsuyoshi Shinoda (篠田 光亮; born 1981), Japanese actor
- Mitsuyoshi Sonoda (園田 光慶; 1940–1997), Japanese manga artist
- Yagyū Jūbei Mitsuyoshi (柳生 十兵衞 三厳; 1607–1650), Japanese samurai
- Mitsuyoshi Yanagisawa (柳沢 光美; born 1948), Japanese politician
- Yoshida Mitsuyoshi (吉田 光由; 1598–1672), Japanese mathematician

Mitsuyoshi (written: 光吉) is also a Japanese surname. Notable people with the surname include:

- Takenobu Mitsuyoshi (光吉 猛修; born 1967), Japanese video game composer
