= Hayashi Gonsuke =

Hayashi Gonsuke may refer to:

- Hayashi Yasusada, (1806-1868) also known as "Hayashi Gonsuke", samurai general with Aizu Domain in the Boshin War
- Hayashi Gonsuke (diplomat), (1860-1939) diplomat in Meiji period and Taisho period Japan, grandson of the above
