= Ono Pharmaceutical =

Japanese pharmaceutical company

Ono Pharmaceutical Co., Ltd.
- Native name: 小野薬品工業
- Type: Public (K.K)
- Traded as: TYO: 4528
- ISIN: JP3197600004
- Industry: Pharmaceuticals
- Founded: 1717; 309 years ago as Fushimiya Ichibei apothecary
- Founder: Ichibei Ono I
- Headquarters: Chuo-ku, Osaka, 541-8564, Japan
- Area served: Worldwide
- Key people: Gyo Sagara (President and CEO)
- Products: Pharmaceuticals; Diagnostic reagents
- Revenue: ▲USD 6.3 billion (FY 2023)
- Net income: USD 848.1 million (FY 2023)
- Number of employees: 3,687 (2023)
- Website: Official website

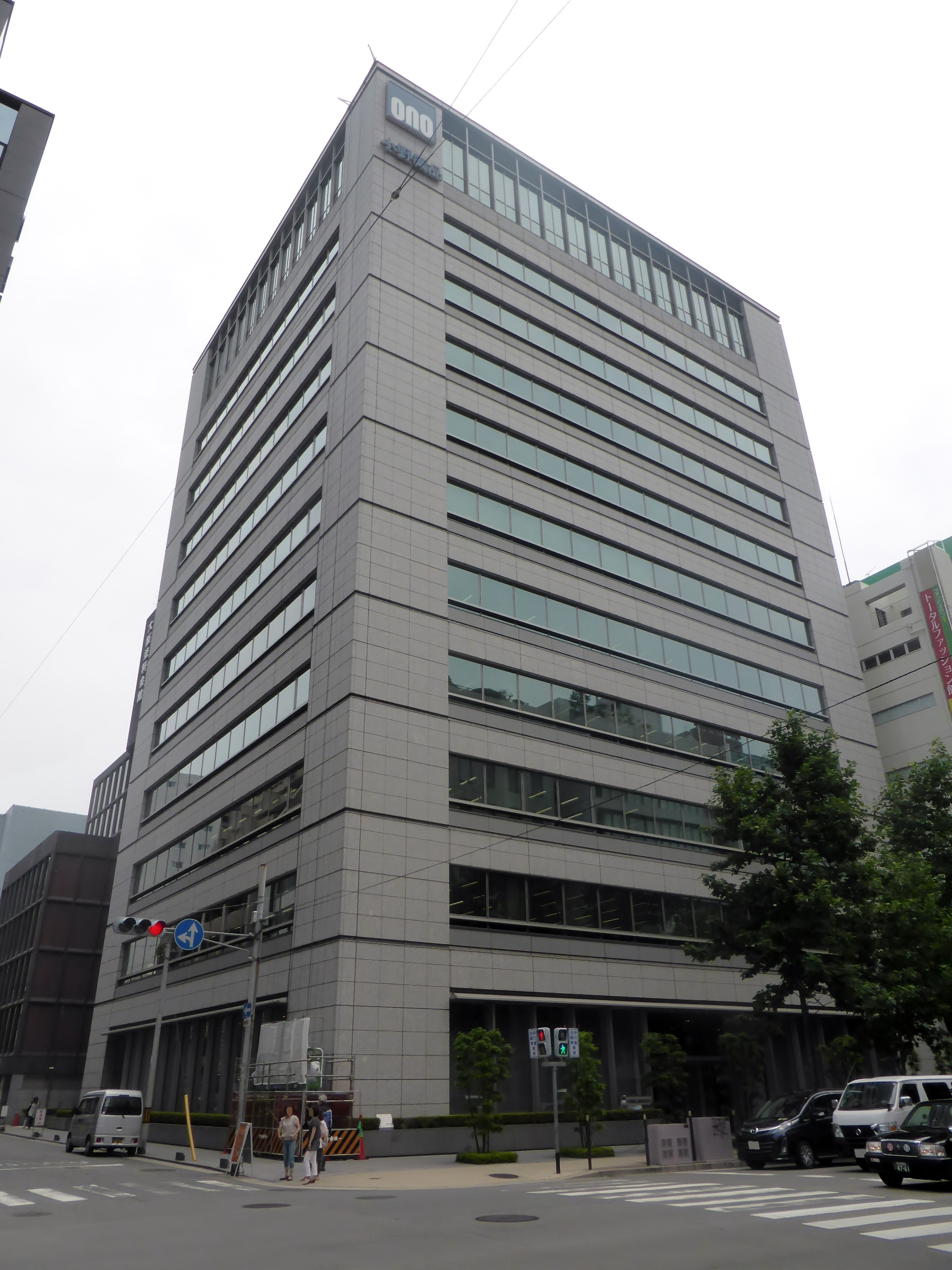
Ono Pharmaceutical's headquarters in Chūō-ku, Osaka, Japan

Ono Pharmaceutical Co., Ltd. (小野薬品工業株式会社, Ono Yakuhin Kōgyō Kabushiki-gaisha) is one of the largest pharmaceutical companies in Japan. It is headquartered in Chuo-ku, Osaka, Japan, with its major plants in Higashinari-ku, Osaka, and Fujinomiya, Shizuoka., and its central research institute at Minase, Shimamoto-cho, Mishima District, Osaka.

Ono Pharmaceutical's roots go back to 1717 when Ichibei Ono (Japanese: 小野市兵衛) started his dealer business of pharmaceuticals in Osaka. His business expanded and changed its name a few times, and became Ono Pharmaceutical Industrial Co., Ltd. (Japanese: 小野薬品工業株式会社) in 1948.

Ono has been listed in Tokyo Stock Exchange since 1963. Its consolidated earnings in the half year ending in March 2018 were 16 billion Japanese yen.

Nivolumab, the cancer drug based on the research of Prof. Dr. Tasuku Honjo of Kyoto University, who received the Nobel Prize later in 2018, is marketed by both Ono Pharmaceutical and Bristol-Myers Squibb.

In 2024, Harvard University and Ono Pharmaceutical (ONO) entered into a joint research and drug development agreement. Under it, promising projects to test therapeutic targets will be selected over 5 years under the guidance of Harvard's Office of Technology Development, and ONO will fund the work.

In October 2026, Ono Pharmaceutical entered into a licensing agreement with Biohaven for exclusive rights to develop and commercialize three investigational IgG degraders, including BHV-1300, in Japan, South Korea, Taiwan and ASEAN countries. The agreement included an upfront payment of US$80 million, a potential US$20 million milestone payment and royalties.

== See also ==
- Opdivo
- Bristol-Myers Squibb
