= The 100 Views of Nature in Kansai =

Selection of Japanese views

This is a list of 100 views of nature decided upon by the Kansai Global Environment Forum in Japan for their natural beauty, history and cultural significance.

== Summary ==
No	Name	Japanese	Area
1	Otsu Lakeside Nagisa Park	大津湖岸なぎさ公園	Ōtsu, Shiga Prefecture
2	Shigaraki Ceramic Cultural Park	滋賀県立陶芸の森	Shigaraki, Shiga
3	Lotus clusters on Karasuma Peninsula	烏丸半島の蓮群生地	Kusatsu, Shiga
4	Lake Biwa World Citizens' Forest	びわこ地球市民の森	Moriyama, Shiga
5	Hachimanbori Channel and the western lakeside reed beds	八幡堀と西の湖のヨシ群生地	Ōmihachiman, Shiga
6	Eigen-ji Temple and Kijiya village	永源寺と木地師の里	Higashiōmi, Shiga
7	Kōra, the Streams Funpark Town	甲良せせらぎ遊園	Kōra, Shiga
8	Mount Ibuki	伊吹山	Maibara, Shiga
9	Chikubu Island	竹生島	Nagahama, Shiga
10	Kohoku Wild Bird Center and eri-style net fishing	湖北町水鳥公園とえり漁	Nagahama, Shiga
11	Amenomori region in Takatsuki, Shiga	高月雨森地区	Nagahama, Shiga
12	Lake Yogo	余呉湖	Nagahama, Shiga
13	Kaizu Osaki	海津大崎	Takashima, Shiga
14	Terraced rice fields	畑の棚田	Takashima, Shiga
15	Katsura River (up stream of Ado River)	葛川（安曇川上流）	Ōtsu and Takashima, Shiga
16	Mount Hiei	比叡山	Ōtsu, Shiga and Sakyō-ku, Kyoto, Kyoto Prefecture
17	Lake Biwa Canal	琵琶湖疏水	Ōtsu, Shiga and Sakyō-ku, Kyoto
18	Kamo River	鴨（賀茂）川	Kyoto
19	Kurama-dera temple and Kibune area	鞍馬と貴船	Sakyō-ku, Kyoto
20	Ōhara Village	大原の里	Sakyō-ku, Kyoto
21	Joshoko-ji Temple	常照皇寺	Ukyō-ku, Kyoto
22	Kayabuki Village in Miyama	かやぶきの里 美山	Nantan, Kyoto
23	Maizuru Bay	舞鶴湾	Maizuru, Kyoto
24	Amanohashidate	天橋立	Miyazu, Kyoto
25	Funeya houses of Ine	伊根の舟屋	Ine, Kyoto
26	Mount Taiko	太鼓山	Kyōtango and Ine, Kyoto
27	Kotohiki Beach	琴引浜	Kyōtango, Kyoto
28	Moto-Ise	元伊勢	Fukuchiyama, Kyoto
29	Rurikei Valley	るり渓	Nantan, Kyoto
30	Hozu River Valley	保津峡	Ukyō-ku and Kameoka, Kyoto
31	Three-river confluence	三川合流	Yawata and Ōyamazaki, Kyoto; Shimamoto, Osaka Prefecture
32	Village of stone Buddhas in Tōno	石仏の里 当尾	Kizugawa, Kyoto Prefecture
33	Yodo River	宇治川	Uji-cho and Makishima-cho, Uji City, Kyoto Prefecture
34	Mount Rokkō and Nunobiki Falls	六甲山と布引の滝	Ashiya, Nishinomiya, Takarazuka City, Akashi, and Kōbe, Hyōgo Prefecture
35	Kōshien Bay	甲子園の浜	Hamakōshien, Nishinomiya City, Hyōgo Prefecture
36	Tanō Site and Nōgyō Park	田能遺跡と農業公園	Tanō, Amagasaki, Hyōgo Prefecture
37	Koya Pond	昆陽池	Itami, Hyōgo Prefecture
38	Hyogo Prefectural Arima Fuji Park	兵庫県立有馬富士公園	Fukushima, Sanda City, Hyōgo Prefecture
39	Tamba Traditional Crafts Park, Tachikui	丹波立杭陶の郷	Kamitachikui, Konda-cho, Tamba Sasayama City, Hyōgo Prefecture
40	Miwakare Koen Park	水分れ公園	Hikami, Hikami, Tamba, Hyōgo Prefecture
41	Terraced rice fields of Isarigami	岩座神の棚田	Isaragai, Kamiku, Taka-chō, Hyōgo Prefecture
42	The streets of Izushi	出石の町並み	Izushi, Toyooka, Hyōgo Prefecture
43	Hyogo Park of the Oriental White Stork	兵庫県立コウノトリの郷公園	Shōnji, Toyooka, Hyōgo Prefecture
44	Takeno Beach	竹野浜	Takeno, Takeno-chō, Toyooka, Hyōgo Prefecture
45	Kasumi Coast and Hamasaka Coast	香住・浜坂海岸	Kami and Shin'onsen, Mikata, Hyōgo Prefecture
46	Ueyama Plateau	上山高原	Shin'onsen, Mikata, Hyōgo Prefecture
47	Mount Hyōno	氷ノ山	Fukusada, Yabu, Hyōgo Prefecture
48	Tendaki Valley	天滝渓谷	Ikada, Oya-chō, Yabu, Hyōgo Prefecture
49	Fukuchi Valley and Tonomine Highlands	福知渓谷と砥峰高原	Kamikawa, Kanzaki District, Shisō, Hyōgo Prefecture
50	The clear waters of Chikusa River	千種川の清流	Sayō; Kamigōri, Akō District; and Akō in Shisō, Hyōgo Prefecture
51	The streets of Hirafuku	平福の町並み	Sayō, Hyōgo Prefecture
52	The streets of Tatsuno and tatami mat embankment	龍野の町並みと畳堤	Tatsuno, Hyōgo Prefecture
53	Irrigation ponds of the Inamino Plateau	印南野台地のため池群	Inami, Takasago, and Kakogawa in Kako District, Hyōgo Prefecture
54	Awaji Yumebutai	淡路夢舞台	Yumebutai, Awaji, Hyōgo
55	Narugashima Island	成ヶ島	Yura, Yura-chō, Sumoto, Hyōgo Prefecture
56	Osaka Castle Park	大阪城公園	Chūō-ku, Osaka, Osaka Prefecture
57	Reed beds of Udono	鵜殿のヨシ原	Udono and Kanmaki in Takatsuki, Osaka Prefecture
58	Settsu-kyō Gorge	摂津峡	Takatsuki, Osaka Prefecture
59	Mt. Ryūō and Miyama Village	竜王山と見山の郷	Ninchōji, Ibaraki, Osaka Prefecture
60	Nose Myōkenzan and the Hatsutani Valley area	能勢妙見山と初谷川周辺	Toyono, Toyono District, Osaka Prefecture
61	Terraced rice fields of Mt. Mikusa and Nagatani	三草山と長谷の棚田	Nose, Toyono District, Osaka Prefecture
62	Meiji no Mori Minō Quasi-National Park	箕面公園	Minoh National Park, Minoh, Osaka Prefecture
63	Expo Commemoration Park	万博記念公園	Senri Banpaku Koen, Suita, Osaka Prefecture
64	Daisenryō kofun and Daisen Park	大仙陵古墳と大仙公園	Daisen-chō and Mozusekiun-chō in Sakai-ku, Sakai, Osaka Prefecture
65	Sayama Pond	狭山池	Iwamuro, Ōsakasayama, Osaka Prefecture
66	Horigo Dam and Kisen Waiwai Village	堀河ダムと紀泉わいわい村	Shindachiwarazubata and Shindachitsuzurabata in Sennan, Osaka Prefecture
67	Beech groves of Mount Izumi Katsuragi and Kaizuka Ibuki Village (formerly Honoji Village)	和泉葛城山ブナ林とほの字の里	Kaizuka, Sobura and Kishiwada in Osaka Prefecture
68	Mount Kongō	金剛山	Gose, Nara Prefecture and Chihayaakasaka, Minamikawachi District, Osaka Prefecture
69	Nara Park and its surroundings	奈良公園とその周辺	Noboriōji-chō, Nara City, Nara Prefecture
70	Mount Yata Fun Forest	矢田山遊びの森	Yata-chō, Yamatokōriyama, Nara Prefecture
71	Ikaruga Town	斑鳩の里	Ikaruga, Ikomi District, Nara Prefecture
72	Umami-kyūryō Park	馬見丘陵公園	Kawai and Kōryō in Kitakatsuragi District, Nara Prefecture
73	Yamanobe-no-Michi Trail	山の辺の道	Tenri, Sakurai, and Nara in Nara Prefecture
74	kashiharajingū and imai machi no machinami	橿原神宮と今井町の町並み	Kashihara, Nara Prefecture
75	Asuka region	飛鳥	Asuka, Takaichi District, Nara Prefecture
76	Mount Nijō and the town of Taima	二上山と當麻の里	Katsuragi, Nara Prefecture
77	Mount Kongō, Mount Yamato Katsuragi and Katsuragi Kodo Path	葛城山と葛城古道	Gose, Nara Prefecture
78	Yoshino	吉野	Yoshino, Yoshino District, Nara Prefecture
79	Mitarai Valley	みたらい渓谷	Tenkawa, Yoshino District, Nara Prefecture
80	Totsukawa River	十津川	Totsukawa, Yoshino District, Nara Prefecture
81	Mount Ōdaigahara	大台ヶ原	Kamikitayama, Yoshino District, Nara Prefecture
82	Soni Highlands	曽爾高原	Soni, Uda District, Nara Prefecture
83	Tsukigase Plum Valley	月ヶ瀬梅渓	Tsukigase Region, Nara, Nara Prefecture
84	Wakanoura Seashore	和歌浦	Wakayama, Wakayama Prefecture
85	Negoro-ji	根来寺	Negoro, Iwade, Wakayama Prefecture
86	Kōyasan chōishi-michi	高野山町石道	Kudoyama, Katsuragi, and Kōya in Ito District, Wakayama Prefecture
87	Mount Kōya and Okunoin Sandō path	高野山と奥の院参道	Kōyasan, Kōya, Ito District, Wakayama Prefecture
88	Terraced rice fields of Aragi-jima Island	あらぎ島の棚田	Aridagawa, Arida District, Wakayama Prefecture
89	Oishi Highland	生石山	Aridagawa, Arida District and Kimino, Kaisō District in Wakayama Prefecture
90	Enjugahama Coast and Hi-no-Misaki Cape	煙樹ヶ浜と日の岬	Mihama, Hidaka District, Wakayama Prefecture
91	Southern plum groves and the Binchо̄tan Village	南部の梅林と備長炭の里	Minabe, Hidaka District, Wakayama Prefecture
92	Cape Tenjin-zaki and Kashima Island	天神崎と神島	Tanabe, Wakayama Prefecture
93	Mount Hyakken Valley	百間山渓谷	Kumano, Tanabe, Wakayama Prefecture
94	Kumano Kodō (the clear waters and One-Sided Cedar of Nonaka)	熊野古道（野中の清水・一方杉）	Hongū region and Nakahechi region in Tanabe, Wakayama Prefecture
95	Kumano Hongū Taisha and Kumano Hayatama Taisha	熊野本宮大社と熊野速玉大社	Hongū, Hongū-chō and Shingū in Tanabe, Wakayama
96	Ukishima-no-Mori Island	浮島の森	Ukijima, Shingū, Wakayama Prefecture
97	Nachi Falls	那智の滝	Nachisan, Nachikatsuura, Higashimuro District, Wakayama
98	Dorokyō Gorge	瀞峡	Kumano, Mie Prefecture; Shingū, Wakayama Prefecture; Kitayama, Wakayama Prefecture; Totsukawa, Yoshino District, Nara Prefecture
99	Kozagawa Gorge	古座川峡	Kozagawa, Higashimuro District, Wakayama Prefecture
100	The Hashigui-iwa Rocks and the Umikongō Rocks	橋杭岩と海金剛	Kushimoto, Higashimuro District, Wakayama Prefecture

== See also ==
- List of Historic Sites of Japan (Osaka)
