= Shimamoto Station =

Railway station in Shimamoto, Osaka Prefecture, Japan

Shimamoto Station 島本駅
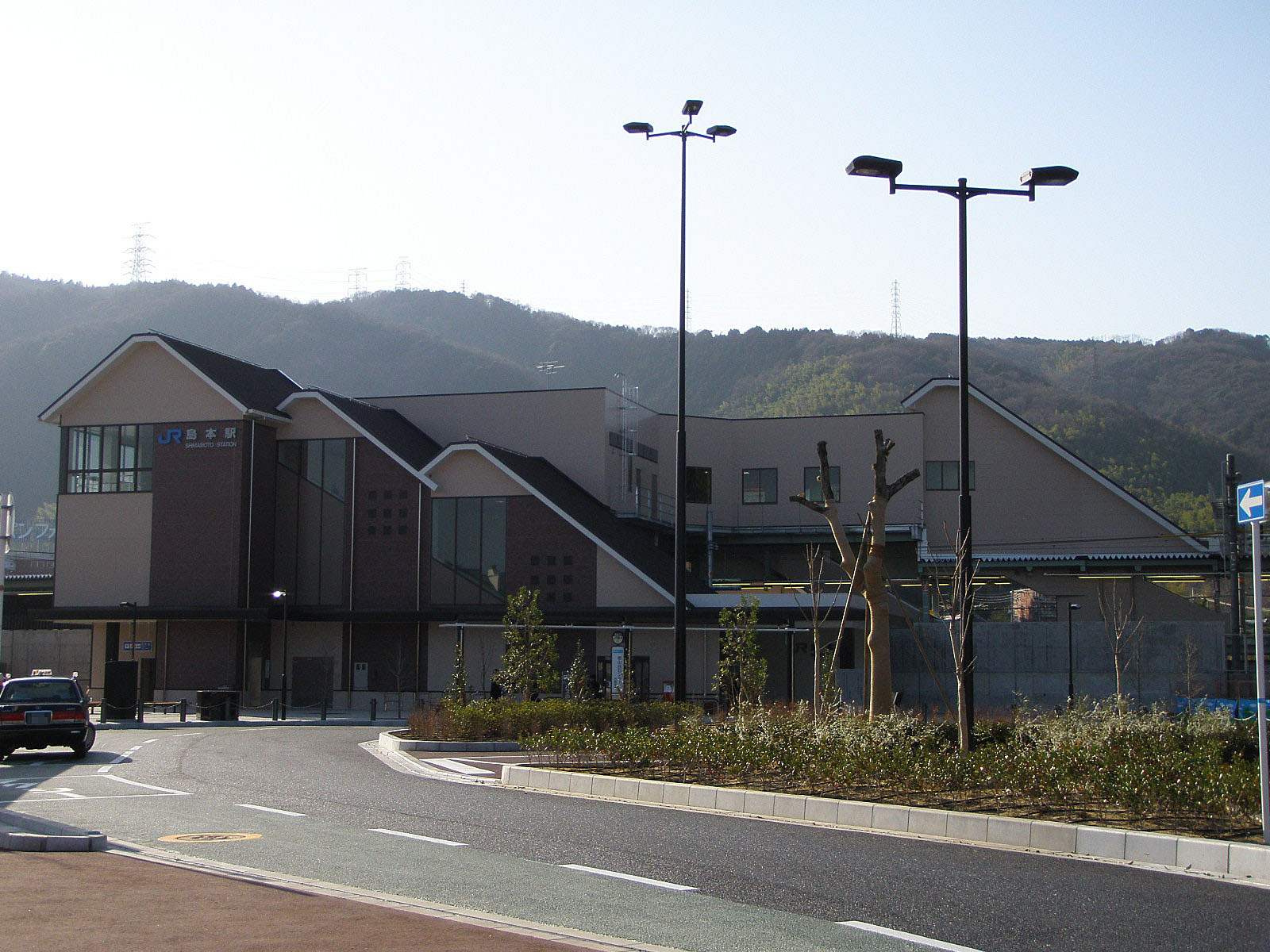
- East side of the station

General information
- Location: 3-39, Sakurai Itchome, Shimamoto, Mishima, Osaka （大阪府三島郡島本町桜井一丁目3-39） Japan
- Coordinates: 34°52′50″N 135°39′46″E
- Operator: JR West
- Line: Tōkaidō Main Line (JR Kyoto Line)
- Connections: Bus stop

Construction
- Structure type: Ground level
- Accessible: Yes

Other information
- Station code: JR-A37

History
- Opened: 2008

Passengers
- FY 2023: 14,564 daily
Location

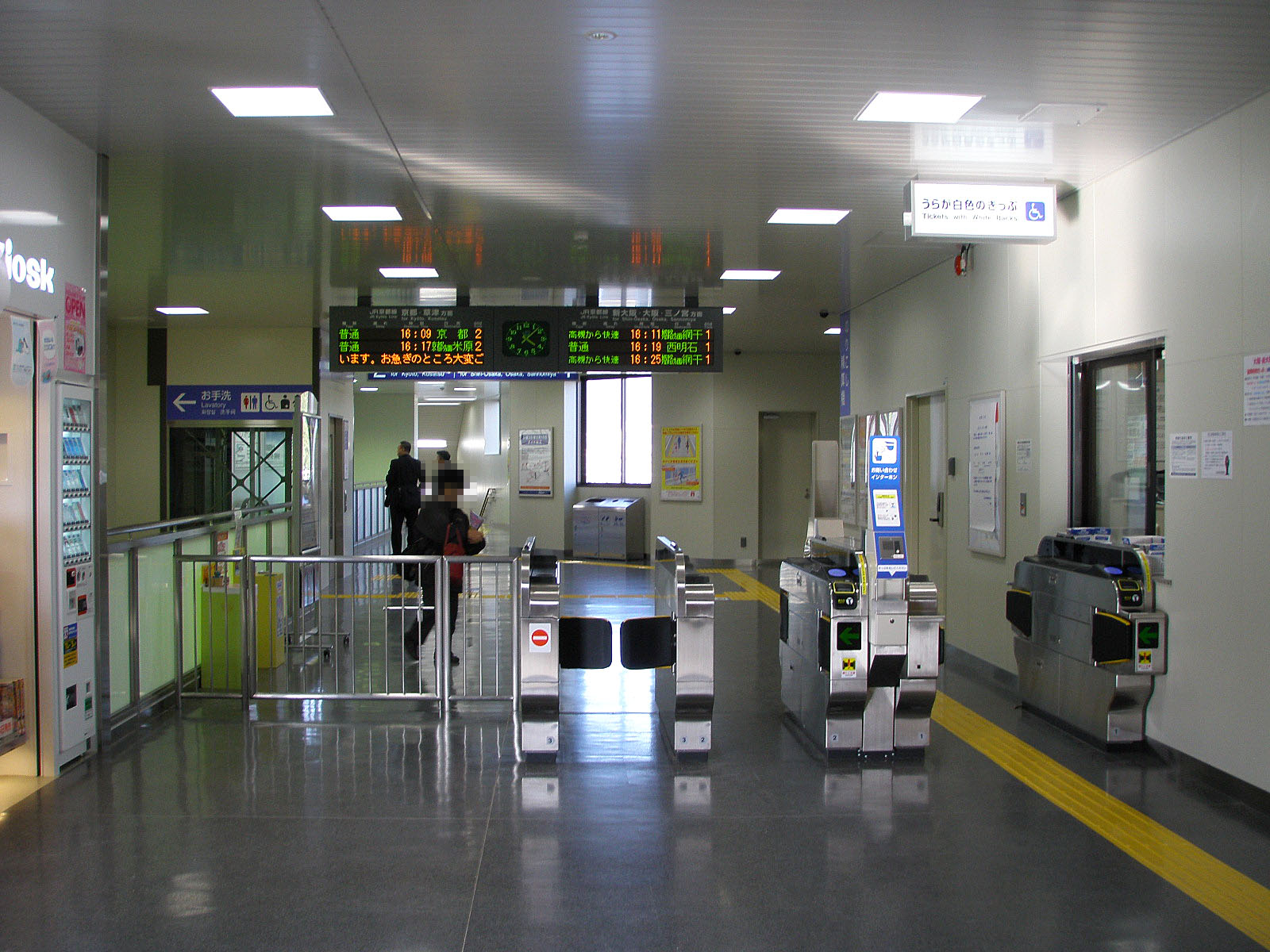
Ticket gate

Shimamoto Station (島本駅, Shimamoto-eki) is a railway station located on the West Japan Railway Company (JR West) Tōkaidō Line (JR Kyōto Line) in Shimamoto, Mishima District, Osaka Prefecture, Japan. The station was opened on March 15, 2008.

== Layout ==
There is an island platform between two inner tracks on the ground. This makes trains on the outer tracks unable to make stop at the station. Ticket gates are located on the overbridge over the platform and tracks.

1	■ JR Kyōto Line	for Shin-Osaka, Osaka and Sannomiya
2	■ JR Kyōto Line	for Kyoto and Kusatsu

== Bus terminal ==
On the east side of the station is a rotary which locates a bus stop. The bus stop serves several routes of Hankyu Bus.

Hankyu Bus:

- Route 30 for Wakayamadai Center
- Route 40 for Wakayamadai Center / for Shin-yamazakibashi via Hankyu Minase
- Route 50 for Wakayamadai Center via Hankyu Minase

== Around the station ==
The park next to the station is the ruin of Sakurai Station (桜井駅跡, Sakurai eki ato), the site of a road station on an ancient highway famous for a story about separation of Kusunoki Masashige with his son at this place before the Battle of Minatogawa in 1336. The park has a monument of poetry by Emperor Meiji (calligraphy by Tōgō Heihachirō) among other monuments calligraphed by Nogi Maresuke and Konoe Fumimaro.

Minase Station on the Hankyū Kyoto Main Line is about 10 minutes walk from Shimamoto Station. Minase was the only one station in Shimamoto before Shimamoto Station opened.

== History ==
Shimamoto station opened on 15 March 2008.

Station numbering was introduced to the station in March 2018 with Shimamoto being assigned station number JR-A37.

== Adjacent stations ==
«	Service	»
JR Kyōto Line
Yamazaki	Local (Including rapid service after the morning)	Takatsuki
Rapid Service (in the morning): Does not stop at this station
Special Rapid Service: Does not stop at this station
Kansai Airport Limited Express "Haruka": Does not stop at this station
Limited Express "Hida": Does not stop at this station
Limited Express "Kuroshio": Does not stop at this station
Limited Express "Super Hakuto": Does not stop at this station
Limited Express "Thunderbird": Does not stop at this station
