= Oodaigahara =

Oodaigahara may refer to:

- Mount Ōdaigahara, a mountain in Japan
- 11151 Oodaigahara, a minor planet named after the mountain
- 'Third of May / Ōdaighara,' a song by Fleet Foxes from their album Crack-Up
