= Masachika =

- Gender: Male

Origin
- Origin: Japanese
- Meaning: Different meanings depending on the kanji used

Masachika (written: 正親, 昌親, 昌央 or 政近) is a masculine Japanese given name. Notable people with the name include:

- Masachika Ichimura (市村 正親; born 1949), Japanese actor and singer
- Matsuda Masachika (松田 政近; died 1582), Japanese samurai
- Matsudaira Masachika (松平 昌親; 1640–1711), Japanese daimyō
- Ōyutaka Masachika (大豊 昌央; born 1955), Japanese sumo wrestler
