= Maki Yasuomi =

Japanese samurai (1813–1864)

- Born: April 7, 1813; Kurume, Chikugo Province, Japan
- Died: August 22, 1864; Mount Tennōzan, Settsu Province, Japan
- Occupation(s): Arima clan retainer; Shinto priest

Maki Yasuomi (真木 保臣, April 7, 1813 – August 22, 1864) was a Japanese samurai of the late Edo period, who served as a retainer of the Arima clan of Kurume in northern Kyūshū. He was also a Shinto priest of the Suitengū shrine in Kurume. Maki, also known by his court title of Maki Izumi no kami (真木和泉守) or simply Maki Izumi (真木 和泉), was a student of the Mito school's sonnō-jōi ideology, and in particular, Aizawa Seishisai's philosophy.

Maki took part in the Kinmon Incident of 1864 and committed suicide near Osaka with his men, after being chased and surrounded by Aizu and Shinsengumi troops.

== Early life ==
Maki was born in Kurume in 1813, to Maki Toshiomi, the family head of the hereditary line of Shinto priests who cared for the Suitengū shrine. It was during Maki's childhood that his father was made a full-fledged samurai by Arima Yorinori, the lord of Kurume. When Maki was eleven, his father died, leaving him in charge of the family as well as the shrine.

== Intellectual and political career ==
Combining the teachings he had received from Mitogaku and elsewhere, Maki created a new school of thought called Tenpōgaku, named after the era in which it was founded.

== Activity in Kyoto ==
Maki worked with Okubo Toshimichi of Satsuma, in setting up Shimazu Hisamitsu's trip to Kyoto. In 1862, Maki was implicated in the Teradaya incident, and briefly imprisoned.

== Last battle and death ==
Maki took part in the Kinmon Incident of 1864, and joined in Chōshū's attack on Aizu-Satsuma allied forces in Kyoto; however, he was beaten back. He committed suicide with his troops on Mount Tennōzan when he was surrounded by Aizu forces under Hayashi Gonsuke and Jinbo Kuranosuke, and Shinsengumi forces under Kondō Isami. His death poem was: "My life and Japanese spirit come to an end amid the rocks at the summit of this great mountain" (大山の 峯の岩根に うづみけり わが年月の やまとだましひ, Ōyamano mine no iwane ni uzumikeri waga nengetsu no yamatodamashi e). Maki was buried in Ōyamazaki-chō, Kyoto.

The writer Mitsumasu Kimiaki is Maki's descendant.

== Popular portrayals ==
Maki has appeared in several works of fiction which depict the events of the Bakumatsu era. He is a minor character in Kenji Morita's manga Getsumei Seiki and Minamoto Tarō's manga Fūunjitachi Bakumatsuhen. He also appeared in the 1986 Asahi TV miniseries Byakkotai.
