= Minase Station =

Railway station in Shimamoto, Osaka Prefecture, Japan

Minase Station 水無瀬駅
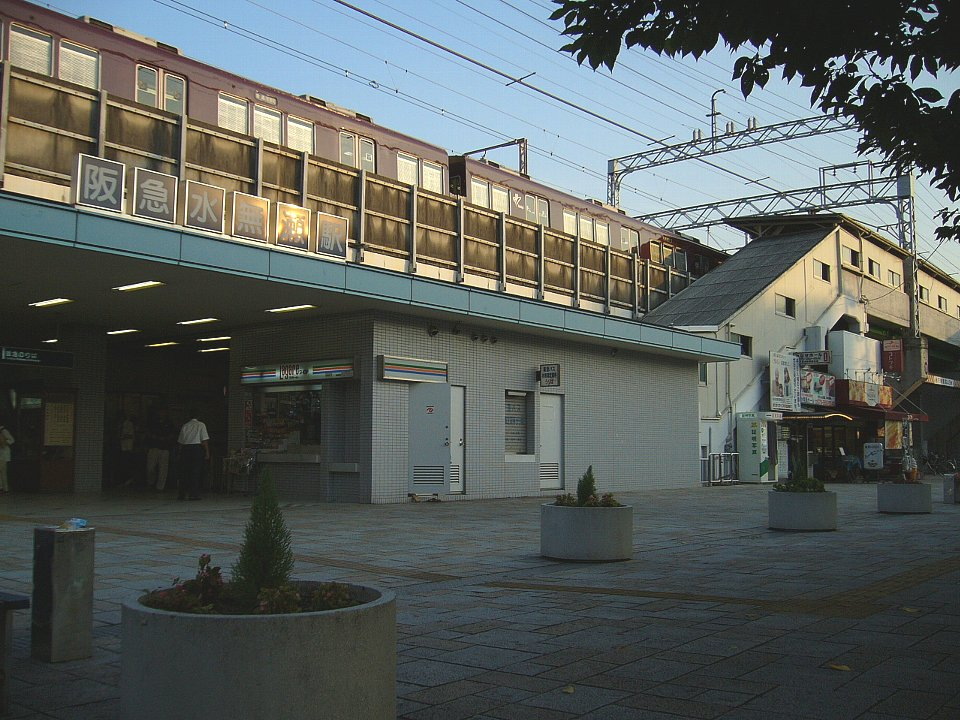
- Minase Station building

General information
- Location: 2-chōme-5 Minase, Shimamoto-cho, Mishima-gun, Osaka-fu 618-0014; Japan
- Coordinates: 34°52′39″N 135°40′03″E
- Operator: Hankyu Railway.
- Line: ■ Hankyu Kyoto Line
- Platforms: 2 side platforms
- Tracks: 2

Construction
- Structure type: Elevated
- Accessible: Yes

Other information
- Station code: HK-74
- Website: Official website

History
- Opened: May 16, 1939
- Former names: Sakurai-no-eki (until 1943)

Passengers
- FY2019: 10,887

Services
Hankyu Kyoto Line
Commutation Limited Express: Does not stop at this station
Limited Express: Does not stop at this station
Semi limited Express: Does not stop at this station
Express: Does not stop at this station
Kammaki	Semi-Express	Ōyamazaki
Kammaki	Local	Ōyamazaki
Location
- Location within Osaka Prefecture Location within Japan

Minase Station (水無瀬駅, Minase-eki) is a train station located in the town of Shimamoto, Mishima District, Osaka Prefecture, Japan. It is operated by the private transportation company Hankyu Railway.

== Lines ==
The station is served by the Kyōto Main Line and is 25.7 kilometers from the terminus of the line at Jūsō and 28.1 kilometers from Osaka-umeda.

== Layout ==
Minase Station is an elevated station with two side platforms and two tracks that run parallel to the viaduct of the Tokaido Shinkansen. There is only one ticket gate, which is located at ground level directly below the viaduct. The stairs connecting the concourse inside the ticket gate to the platform are located on the Kawaramachi side of the platform.

=== Platforms ===
1	■ Kyoto Line	for Kyoto-kawaramachi, Katsura and Arashiyama
2	■ Kyoto Line	for Osaka-umeda, Tengachaya, Kita-Senri, Kobe-sannomiya, and Takarazuka

== History ==
Minase Station opened on 16 May 1939 as Sakurai-no-eki Station (桜井ノ駅駅) on the Keihan Electric Railway Shin-Keihan Line between Kamimaki Station and Ōyamazaki Station. Due to a company merger, it became part of the Keihanshin Express Railway (now Hankyu Railway) and was renamed to its current name on 1 January 1948. The Shin-Keihan Line was renamed the Kyoto Main Line in 1949. The station was elevated in 1963.

Station numbering was introduced to all Hankyu stations on 21 December 2013 with this station being designated as station number HK-74.

== Passenger statistics ==
In fiscal 2019, the station was used by an average of 10,887 passengers daily

== Surrounding area ==
- Sakurai-no-eki site
- Minase Shrine
- Minase Hospital
- Shimamoto Town First Junior High School

== See also ==
- List of railway stations in Japan
