= Battle of Yamazaki =

1582 battle in Sengoku-period Japan

- Part of the Sengoku period
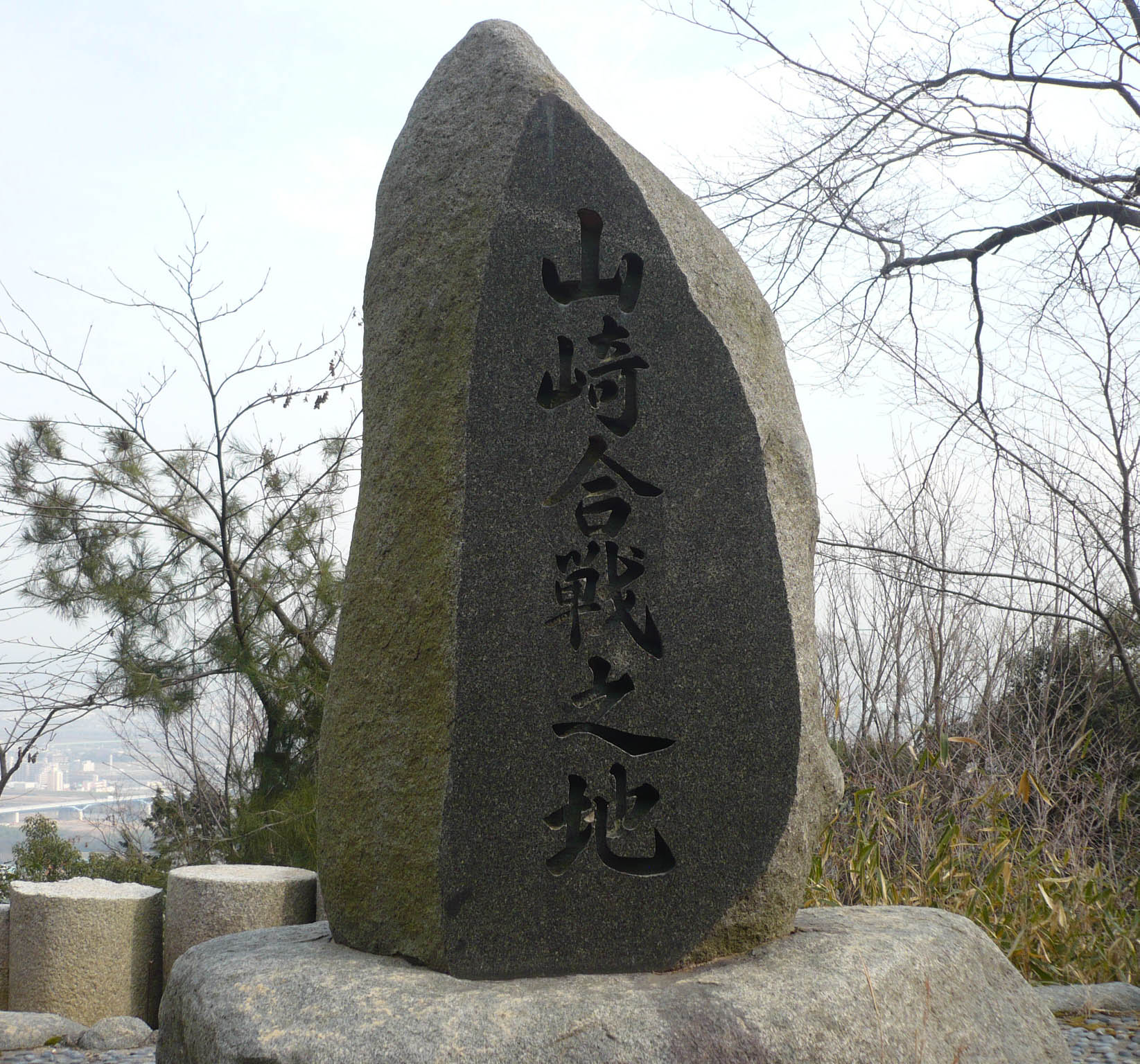
- Yamazaki Battlefield
Date	July 2, 1582
Location	Yamazaki, Yamashiro province, Japan 34°54′25″N 135°41′29″E
Result	Oda clan victory: Hideyoshi begins his consolidation of power
Territorial changes	Hideyoshi taking Nobunaga's authority and power

Belligerents
Forces of the Akechi clan	Forces of the Oda clan

Commanders and leaders
Akechi Mitsuhide (executed); Akechi Hidemitsu †; Akechi Mitsutada †; Akechi Mitsuyoshi †; Saitō Toshikazu †; Saitō Toshimitsu †; Ise Sadaoki †; Matsuda Masachika †; Mimaki Kaneaki †; Shiōden Masataka †; Ogawa Suketada; Nabika Kamon; Tsumaki Norikata; Shibata Katsusada; Tsuda Nobuharu; Murakami Kiyokuni; Toda Yukimasa; Suwa Morinao; Atsuji Sadayuki; Namikawa Yasuie; Mizoo Suketomo; Horio Shobei; Araki Yukishige; Takeda Motoaki	Hashiba Hideyoshi; Oda Nobutaka; Oda Hidekatsu; Hashiba Hidenaga; Niwa Nagahide; Ikeda Tsuneoki; Hachiya Yoritaka; Horio Yoshiharu; Katō Mitsuyasu; Katō Kiyomasa; Takayama Ukon; Nakagawa Kiyohide; Hachisuka Iemasa; Kuroda Yoshitaka; Hori Hidemasa; Ikoma Chikamasa; Fukushima Masanori; Otani Yoshitsugu; Nakamura Kazuuji; Kimura Shigeori; Mikoda Masaharu; Ikeda Motosuke; Tanaka Yoshimasa

Strength
10,000～16,000	20,000～36,000

Casualties and losses
3,000 killed	3,300 killed
- Location within Kyoto Prefecture Battle of Yamazaki (Japan)

The Battle of Yamazaki (山崎の戦い, Yamazaki no tatakai) was fought in 1582 in Yamazaki, Japan, located in current-day Kyoto Prefecture. This battle is sometimes referred to as the Battle of Mt. Tennō (天王山の戦い Tennō-zan no tatakai).

In the Honnō-ji Incident, Akechi Mitsuhide, a retainer of Oda Nobunaga, attacked Nobunaga as he rested in Honnō-ji, and forced him to commit seppuku. Mitsuhide then took over Nobunaga's power and authority around the Kyoto area. Thirteen days later, Oda's forces under Toyotomi Hideyoshi met Mitsuhide at Yamazaki and defeated him, avenging his lord (Nobunaga) and taking Nobunaga's authority and power for himself.

== Background ==
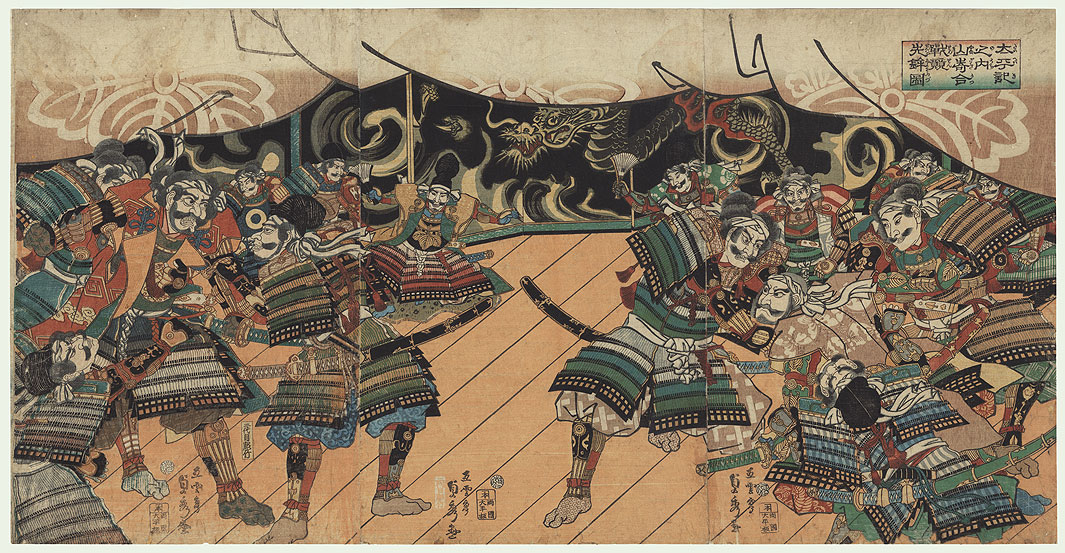
War Council Before the Battle of Yamazaki by Sadahide (1807-1873)

=== Honnō-ji Incident ===
When Nobunaga died, Hideyoshi was busy fighting the Mōri clan in the Siege of Takamatsu. After betraying and defeating Nobunaga at Honnō-ji, Mitsuhide sent a letter to the Mōri. The letter contained a request for an alliance to crush Hideyoshi, but the letter's messenger was intercepted by Hideyoshi's forces and the plot was revealed.

=== Great Chugoku retreat ===
Upon hearing news that Nobunaga had been killed, and that Akechi Mitsuhide had not taken command of his possessions, Hashiba Hideyoshi immediately negotiated a peace treaty with the Mōri by demanding the seppuku of Shimizu Muneharu from Takamatsu, and remained careful to keep Nobunaga's death a secret. Once the treaty was secured, on 25 June, Hideyoshi's forces retreated from Chugoku region and he led his troops on a forced march towards Kyoto, covering up to 40 km a day, spending the night at his Himeji Castle, and reaching Amagasaki on 29 June. Niwa Nagahide and Oda Nobutaka joined him as he passed through Osaka.

== Prelude ==
Akechi Mitsuhide controlled two castles (Shōryūji and Yodo) in the Yamazaki region. Learning of the size of Hideyoshi's army and not wanting to be caught inside a castle with his force divided, Mitsuhide resolved to prepare for battle somewhere to the south. Due to its position between a river and a mountain, Yamazaki provided Mitsuhide with choke points that could ease the number of enemies his forces would have to face at any one time.

Meanwhile, Hideyoshi decided that a wooded area called Mount Tennōzan, just outside the town of Yamazaki, was key to strategic control of the road to Kyoto. He sent a detachment under Nakagawa Kiyohide to secure this area, while he led the majority of the army to Yamazaki himself. His forces took over the mountain and gained a significant advantage.

Mitsuhide arranged his army behind a small river (the Enmyōji-gawa), which provided an excellent defensive position. On the night of 1 July, Hideyoshi's generals Nakamura Kazuuji and Horio Yoshiharu sent a number of ninja into the Mitsuhide camp, setting fire to buildings and generally causing fear and confusion, and therefore robbing the enemy of their sleep for most of the night.

== Battle ==
On the following morning, 2 July, the main fighting began as Hideyoshi's men began to form up along the opposite shore of the Enmyōji-gawa from the enemy, and a portion of Mitsuhide's samurai, led by Matsuda Masachika and Nabika Kamon, crossed the river, seeking to make their way up the wooded Tennōzan hill. They were driven back by arquebus fire, and so Hideyoshi felt confident enough to launch the right wing of his forces, under the command of Kato Mitsuyasu and Ikeda Tsuneoki, across the river, and into Mitsuhide's front lines. They made some progress, and were soon joined by the left wing, with support from atop Mount Tennōzan. The majority of Mitsuhide's men fled, with the exception of the 200 men under Mimaki Kaneaki, who charged and were destroyed by Hideyoshi's larger force.

Soon, panic set in among the Akechi army, and Hideyoshi's army chased them back to Shōryūji, where the garrison collapsed. Mitsuhide himself fled much further, to the town of Ogurusu, where he was killed by a gang of bandits. Mitsuhide is thought to have been killed by a bandit known as Nakamura about two weeks after the battle.

== Aftermath ==
On July 7, as the Oda clan learned of the defeat of Takigawa Kazumasu by the Hōjō clan at the Battle of Kanagawa, Toyotomi Hideyoshi sent a letter to Tokugawa Ieyasu to give him authorization to lead military operations to secure the two provinces of Kai province and Shinano province from the Hōjō and Uesugi clan, thus the Tenshō-Jingo war begun.

== In popular culture ==
The Battle of Yamazaki is the final stage of Akechi Mitsuhide in Samurai Warriors and the first stage of Toyotomi Hideyoshi in Samurai Warriors 2. It also features as a campaign map in The Conquerors expansion of the real-time strategy game Age of Empires II.

The battle is also the basis for the Sonny Chiba martial arts film Shogun's Ninja.
