= Matsuda Masachika =

Japanese samurai of the Akechi clan

- 松田政近
- Born: Tanba Province
- Died: July 2, 1582; Battle of Yamazaki
- Military career
- Allegiance: Akechi clan
- Conflicts: Tanba Campaign (1578); Honnoji Incident (1582); Battle of Yamazaki (1582)

Matsuda Masachika (松田政近) (died 1582) was a member of the Japanese Akechi clan. He was vassal of Akechi Mitsuhide. Masachika was born into a prestigious family of the Tanba Province region and lived during the 16th-century Sengoku period and the early years of the Azuchi–Momoyama period.

In 1582, following the betrayal at Honnōji, Masachika served on the side of Akechi Mitsuhide.

He continued to serve under Mitsuhide during the Battle of Yamazaki where he was expected to lead the right wing due to his familiarity with the region. After an intense battle against Kuroda Kanbei, Masachika died at the battlefield.
