= Shimamoto, Osaka =

Shimamoto 島本町
- Town
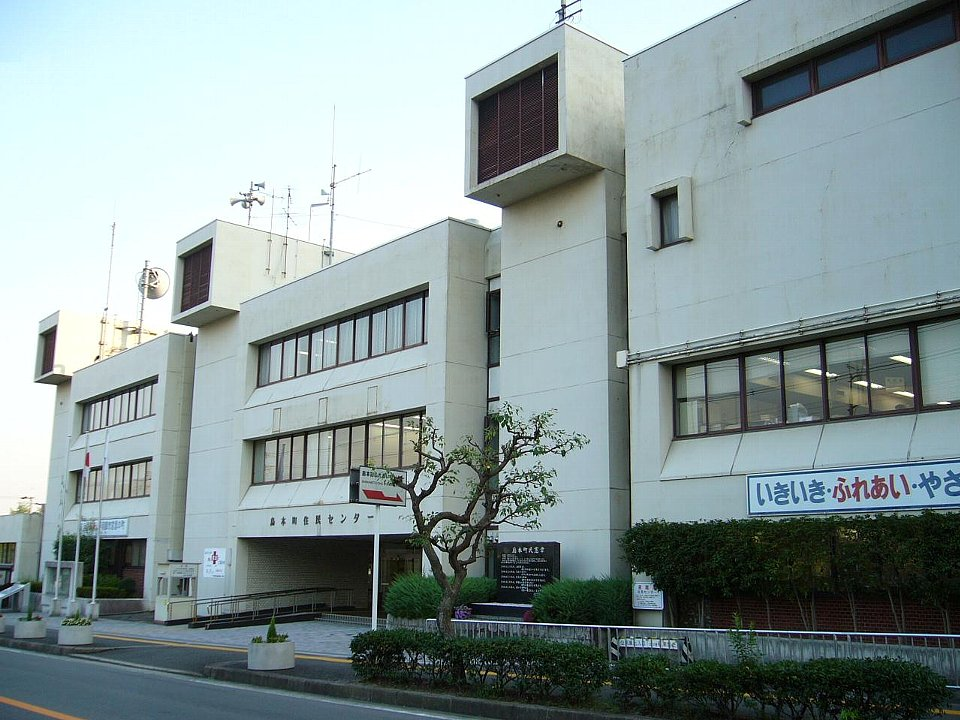
- Shimamoto town hall

- Flag Seal
- Location of Shimamoto in Osaka Prefecture

- Location in Japan
- Coordinates: 34°53′02″N 135°39′47″E
- Country: Japan
- Region: Kansai; Kinki
- Prefecture: Osaka
- District: Mishima

Area
  - Total: 16.81 km^{2} (6.49 sq mi)

Population (March 1, 2025)
  - Total: 32,292
  - Density: 1,921/km^{2} (4,975/sq mi)
- Time zone: UTC+09:00 (JST)
- City hall address: 2-1-1 Sakurai, Shimamoto-cho, Mishima-gun, Osaka-fu 618-8570
- Website: Official website
- Symbols
- Flower: Kerria japonica
- Tree: Kusunoki

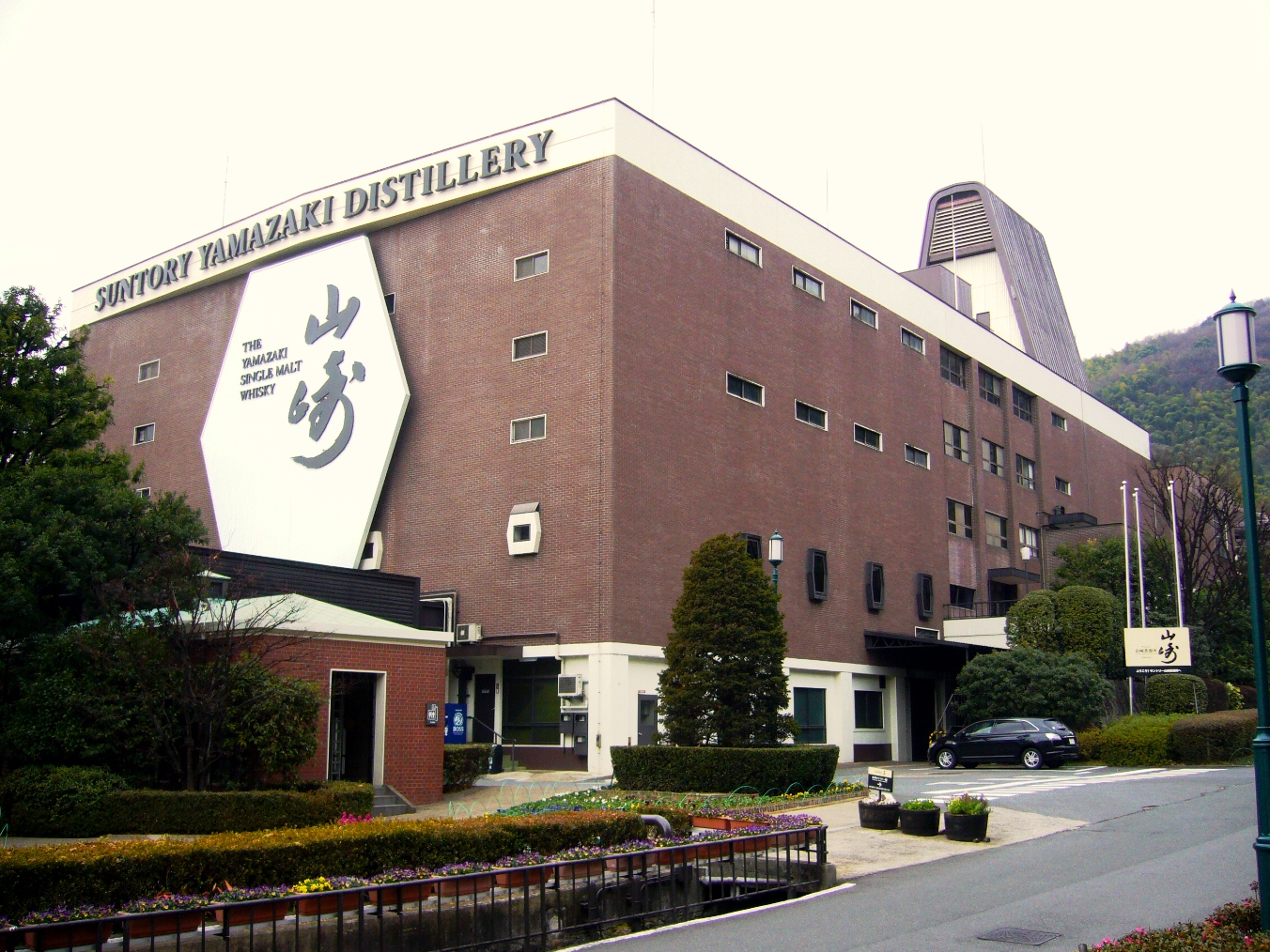
Suntory Yamazaki distillery in Shimamoto

Shimamoto (島本町, Shimamoto-chō) is a town consisting of the entirety of Mishima District, Osaka Prefecture, Japan. As of 1 March 2025, the town had an estimated population of 32,292 in 14334 households, and a population density of 1900 people per km^{2}. It has prospered for a long time as a key point of transportation from Kyoto to Osaka. Recently, residential area development is progressing as commuter town of Osaka City and Kyoto City.

== Geography ==
Shimamoto occupies a large part of the Minase River basin, a tributary of the Yodo River in far northeastern Osaka Prefecture. The town area stretches from northwest to southeast, and the elevation increases towards the northwest. Nearly 70% of the town is mountainous and hilly. The urban area is located in a small open area along the Yodo River in the southeast, and major transportation routes pass through this area. There is a point where the three rivers, Katsura River, Uji River, Kizu River, merge, and because the water temperatures of each river are different, there is a lot of fog in the winter. The highest elevation is 631.4 meters at Shakadake, and the lowest is 8.5 meters at Takahama.

=== Neighbouring municipalities ===
- Osaka Prefecture
  - Takatsuki
  - Hirakata
- Kyoto Prefecture
  - Kyoto
  - Nagaokakyō
  - Yawata
  - Ōyamazaki

== Climate ==
The town has a maritime climate characterized by warm humid summers and cool winters with light snowfall (Köppen climate classification Cfa). The average annual temperature in Shimamoto is 14.5 °C. The average annual rainfall is 1677 mm with September as the wettest month. The temperatures are highest on average in August, at around 26.5 °C, and lowest in January, at around 3.1 °C.

=== Demographics ===
Per Japanese census data, the population of Shimamoto is as shown below.

Historical population
Year	Pop.	±%
1940	6,015	—
1950	8,160	+35.7%
1960	9,173	+12.4%
1970	16,873	+83.9%
1980	24,663	+46.2%
1990	29,971	+21.5%
2000	30,125	+0.5%
2010	28,935	−4.0%
2020	30,927	+6.9%

== History ==
The area of Shimamoto was part of ancient Settsu Province. Sandwiched between Mount Tennōzan and Otokoyama, it is the only transportation hub that does not require crossing the mountain on the road connecting Settsu and Yamashiro Province. Since ancient times, it was on the route of the San'yō Expressway that connected the capital of Heian-kyō and Dazaifu. The area where the Minase and Yodo rivers meet (currently the Hirose and Todaiji districts) is called "Minase". Known for its scenery and fluttering haze, it has been used as a pillow word since the time of "Man'yōshū". Emperor Go-Toba built a palace, Minamise Rikyū (currently Minamise Jingū) at this location. The Sakurai-no-eki in Sakurai district is the location where Kusunoki Masashige parted from his son while en route to the Battle of Minatogawa per the Taiheiki. Shimamoto is also the location of the battlefield of Battle of Yamazaki where Toyotomi Hideyoshi (Hashiba Hideyoshi) defeated Akechi Mitsuhide.

The village of Shimamoto was formed on 1 April 1889 with the establishment of the modern municipalities system. It was raised to town status on 1 April 1940.

== Government ==
Shimamoto has a mayor-council form of government with a directly elected mayor and a unicameral town council of 14 members. Shimamoto, collectively with the city of Takatsuki, contributes four members to the Osaka Prefectural Assembly. In terms of national politics, the town is part of the Osaka 10th District of the lower house of the Diet of Japan.

== Economy ==
The economy of Shimamoto is mixed commercial, light manufacturing and agricultural. It is increasingly a commuter town for the Osaka and Kyoto metropolis. Shimamoto is also the location of Suntory's Yamazaki Distillery, the oldest whiskey distillery in Japan.

=== Industry ===
- Hitachi Metal Yamazaki Manufacturing Department
- Ono Pharmaceutical Minase Research Institute
- Sekisui Chemical Development Laboratory
- Suntory Yamazaki Distillery
- Toppan Forms Osaka Sakurai Factory

=== Financial institution ===
- Bank of Kyoto Yamazaki Branch (Minamise 1-chome)
- Kita Osaka Shinkin Bank Shimamoto Branch (Minase 2-chome)
- Resona Bank Shimamoto Branch (Egawa 2-chome)

== Education ==
Shimamoto has four public elementary schools and two public junior high schools operated by the town government, and one private junior high school, The town has one public high school operated by the Osaka Prefectural Board of Education and one private high school..

== Transportation ==
=== Railways ===
Hankyu Railway - Kyoto Main Line

■ Minase

JR West - Tōkaidō Main Line (JR Kyōto Line)

■ Shimamoto

=== Highways ===
- Meishin Expressway
- National Route 171

== Sister cities ==
- Frankfort, Kentucky, United States
