= Akechi Mitsutsuna =

- Children: Akechi Mitsuhide
- Relatives: Akechi Mitsutsugu (father); Saitō Dōsan (brother-in-law)
- Military career
- Allegiance: Toki clan Akechi clan

Akechi Mitsutsuna (明智 光綱) was a senior retainer under the Toki clan from Akechi clan throughout the latter Sengoku period of feudal Japan. He was the father of Akechi Mitsuhide and brother of "Omi-no-kata" (Saitō Dōsan's wife). His father was Akechi Mitsutsugu (1468–1538).
