= Otsu Lakeside Nagisa Park =

Park in Japan

Coordinates: 35°00′17″N 135°53′29″E

Otsu Lakeside Nagisa Park (大津湖岸なぎさ公園, Ōtsu Kogan Nagisa Kōen) is a park in Otsu City, Shiga Prefecture, Japan, on the shores of Lake Biwa. It is renowned for its views, being one of the top 100 Views of Nature in Kansai, and is popular with both locals and visitors.

== Layout ==
The park is long and narrow, running in a 4.8km long strip along the lakeshore of Lake Biwa from Otsu-Hama to the Omi-Ohashi bridge.

The park was completed in 1998, and is divided into 6 different areas along its length. These areas are the event plaza, the Utsugi no Mori forest, the Nagisa Promenade, the Citizen Plaza, Sunshine Beach, and the Zeze-Seiran no Michi Pathway.

== Activities ==
During the warmer months visitors can do water sports off the beach areas, and picnic on the beach or grassy areas.

During the cherry blossom season, the park is popular due to its numerous cherry trees. The Kawazu cherry trees bloom earlier than other varieties, and start to bloom in the park from late February.

The park also features roughly 50,000 Shibazakura (しばざくら、moss phlox) plants. These plants bloom with intense pink flowers, forming a thick pink carpet. The best season to see the flowers is from early April to early May.

The Citizen Plaza has panoramic views of Mount Hiei and the Hira Mountains, as well as nighttime views of the lights of the cityscape.

In August, the Lake Biwa Great Fireworks Festival is held just offshore from the park. Approximately ten thousand fireworks are set off over an hour, and roughly 300,000 people watch the fireworks display. The 2025 version of this festival will be held on August 8th.

== Access ==
- Train - Ōtsu Station is on the JR Biwako Line. Trains from Kyoto Station take approximately 30 minutes. The park is approximately 15 minutes walk from Otsu station.
- Bus - The number 18 bus from Kyoto station arrives at Ōtsu station in approximately 45 minutes.
- Bicycle - it is possible to cycle from Kyoto. There are several bicycle rental shops in the Kyoto Station area. Following the Lake Biwa Canal, the ride takes roughly one hour.
