= Akechi Mitsuyoshi =

Japanese samurai

- 明智 光慶
- Born: 1569
- Died: July 4, 1582 (aged 12–13); Sakamoto Castle
- Relatives: Akechi Mitsuhide (father)
- Military career
- Allegiance: Akechi clan
- Conflicts: Battle of Yamazaki (1582)

Akechi Mitsuyoshi (明智 光慶; 1569 – July 4, 1582) was a Japanese samurai of the Sengoku period and the eldest son of Akechi Mitsuhide. He stayed at Kameyama Castle when the Honnoji Incident occurred.

In 1582, during Honnoji Incident, after Oda Nobutada died at Nijo Castle, he moved to Sakamoto Castle in Omi Province and was given the task of defending the western provinces.

When his father, Mitsuhide, was defeated in the Battle of Yamazaki, he was himself fighting a losing battle against Nakagawa Kiyohide and Dom Justo Takayama, whereupon he committed seppuku.
