= Hayashi Yasusada =

Hayashi Gonsuke (林 権助; March 23, 1806 – June 27, 1868) was a Japanese samurai of the late Edo period. Also known by his formal name (imina (諱)), Yasusada (安定), A retainer of the Aizu domain, Gonsuke was an accomplished martial artist of Ichinomiya ryu iaijutsu, Naganuma ryu strategy, and gunnery. Promoted to artillery magistrate (大砲奉行, taihō-bugyō) in 1862, he went to Kyoto at the start of Lord Matsudaira Katamori's tenure as Kyoto Shugoshoku. Fighting at the various skirmishes in the 1860s, he most notably fought alongside Shinsengumi against Maki Izumi's force at Tennozan. Commanding Aizu artillery forces at the Battle of Toba–Fushimi, Gonsuke fought against overwhelming odds, coming under heavy fire while inadequately supported by spearmen instead of rifle infantry. Grabbing a long spear, he charged the enemy infantry but was shot repeatedly. Evacuated from the battlefield, he was placed on a Shogunate warship, and died at sea, en route to Edo. His age at death was 63.

Gonsuke's ancestor Matazaburō was famous for having served under Torii Mototada and died at the Battle of Fushimi Castle. On the other hand, Gonsuke's grandson and namesake, Hayashi Gonsuke, was a prominent figure in the Japanese annexation of Korea.
