= Mount Ōdaigahara =

Mountain in Japan

Ōdaigahara-san
- 大台ヶ原山
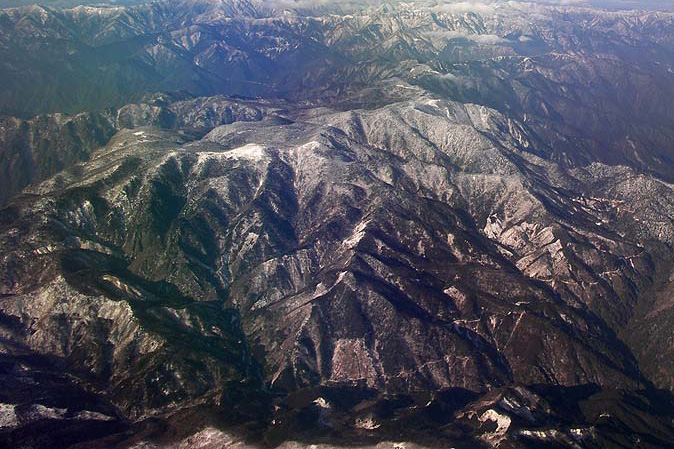
- Mount Odaigahara's massif from the southeast

Highest point
- Elevation: 1,695 m (5,561 ft)
- Coordinates: 34.11°N 136.03°E

Geography
- Location within Japan Location within Asia
- Location: Mie and Nara, Japan

Climbing
- Easiest route: Hiking

Ōdaigahara-san or Ōdaigahara-yama (大台ヶ原山), also Hinode-ga-take or Hide-ga-take (日出ヶ岳) is a mountain in the Daikō Mountain Range on the border between the prefectures of Mie and Nara, Japan. Its top is the highest point in Mie at 1,695 metres (5,561 ft). Walking trails from the Nara side start from a car park at about 1,400 metres. The mountain is famous for wild deer, and also for wild birds, especially wrens and Japanese robins, as well as treecreepers and woodpeckers. In 1980, an area of 36,000 hectares in the region of Mount Ōdaigahara and Mount Ōmine was designated a UNESCO Man and the Biosphere Reserve.

The mountain was also selected by the Tokyo Nichi Nichi Shimbun and Osaka Mainichi Shimbun newspapers as one of the 100 Landscapes of Japan in 1927. It was referenced on American indie folk band Fleet Foxes's 2017 song "Third of May / Ōdaigahara".

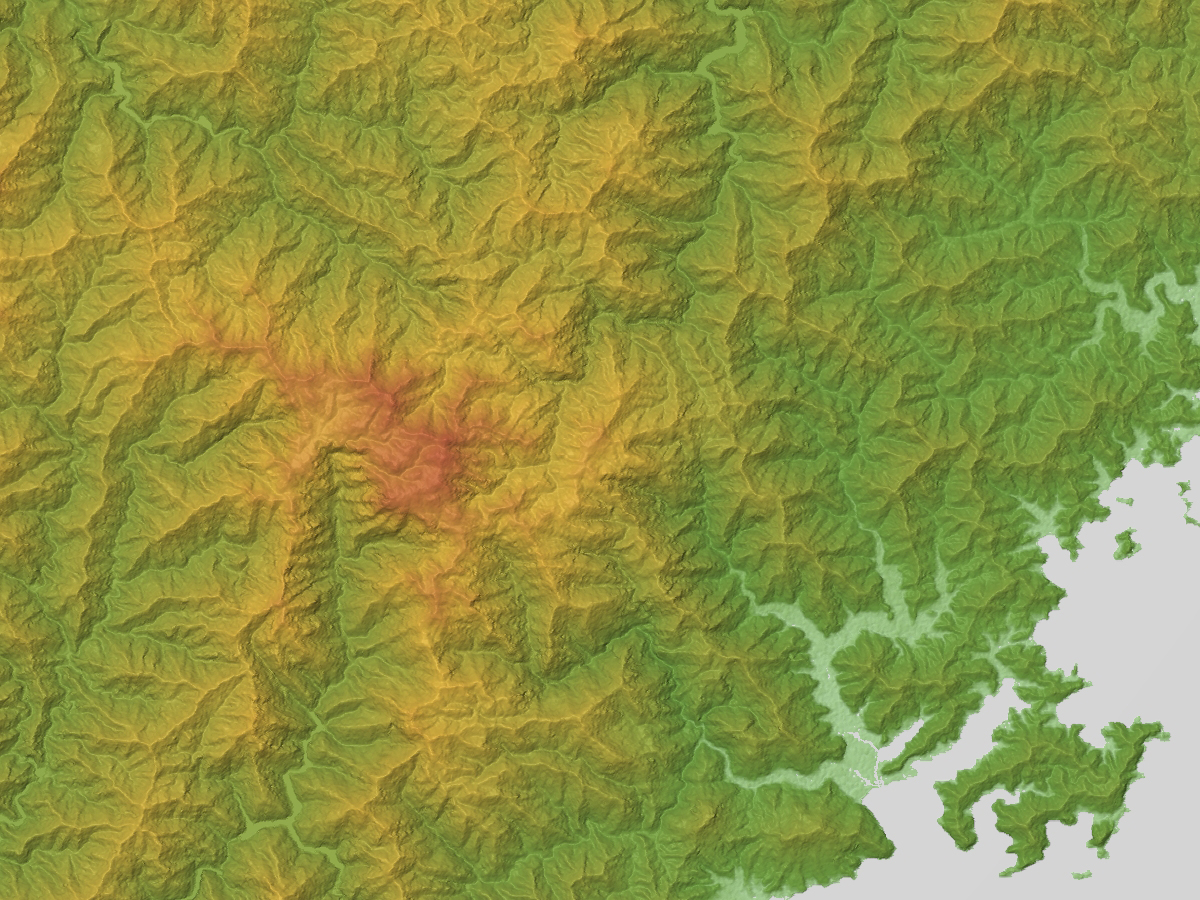
Topographic map of Mount Ōdaigahara and vicinity

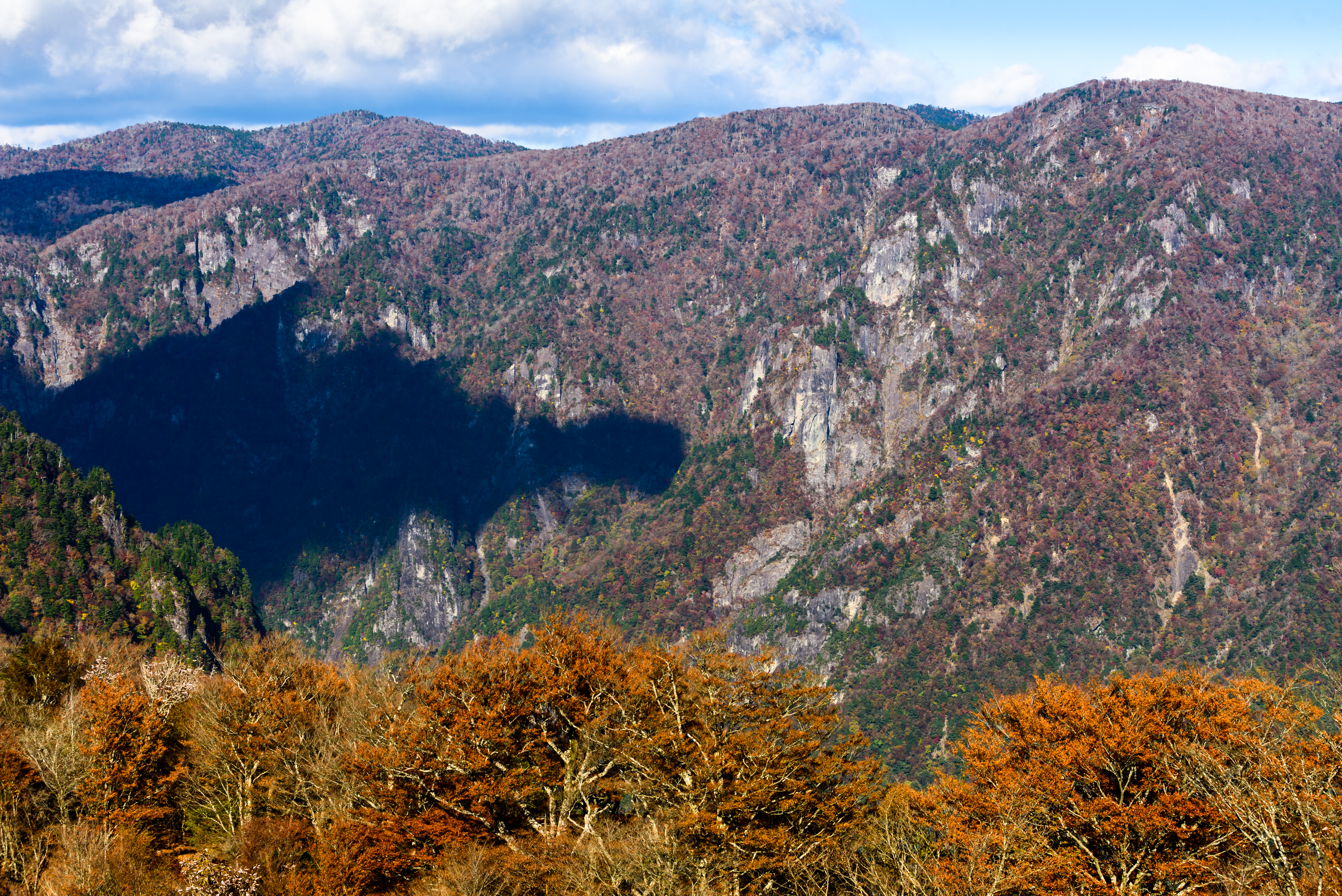
Daijagura (seen from the south-west)

== See also ==
- The 100 Views of Nature in Kansai
