= Kammaki Station =

Railway station in Takatsuki, Osaka Prefecture, Japan

Kammaki Station 上牧駅
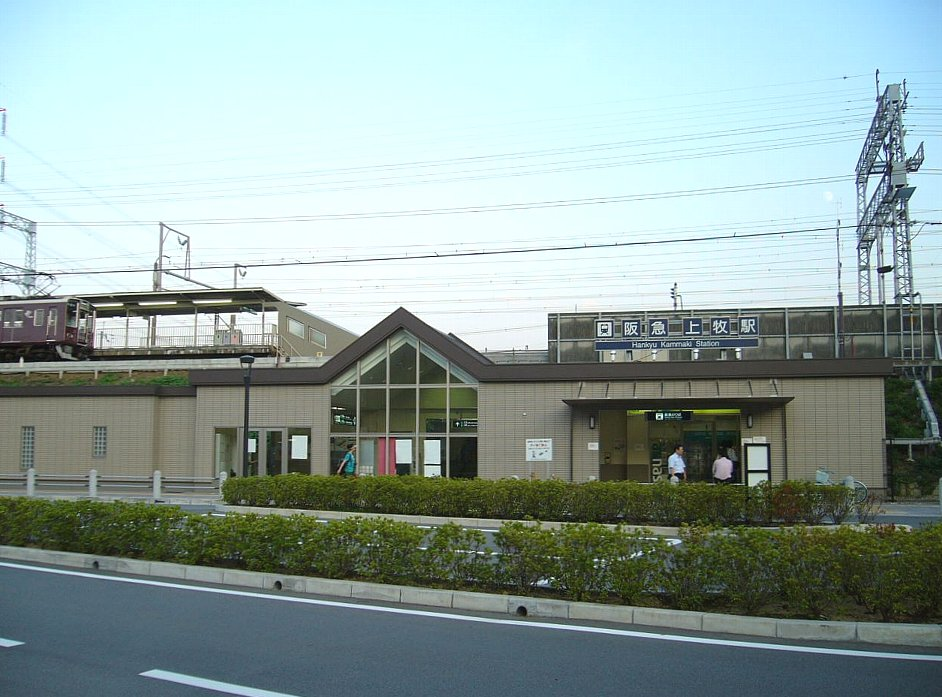
- Kammaki station building in September 2006

General information
- Location: 2-1 Kōnai, Takatsuki-shi, Osaka-fu 569-0007; Japan
- Coordinates: 34°52′18″N 135°39′40″E
- Operator: Hankyu Railway.
- Line: ■ Hankyu Kyoto Line
- Distance: 24.9 km (15.5 miles) from Jūsō
- Platforms: 1 island platform
- Tracks: 2

Other information
- Status: Staffed
- Station code: HK-73
- Website: Official website

History
- Opened: May 13, 1934
- Former names: Kanmaki-sakurainoeki (to 1939)

Passengers
- FY2019: 10,574 daily
Location
- Location within Osaka Prefecture Location within Japan

Kammaki Station (上牧駅, Kanmaki-eki; station number: HK-73) is a passenger railway station located in the city of Takatsuki, Osaka Prefecture, Japan. It is operated by the private transportation company Hankyu Railway.

== Lines ==
Kammaki Station is served by the Hankyu Kyoto Line, and is located 24.9 kilometers from the terminus of the line at Jūsō and 27.3 kilometers from Osaka-umeda.

== Layout ==
The station is embankment elevated station with one island platform and two tracks. There is only one ticket gate on the west side of the track, which is located on the ground level.

=== Platforms ===
1	■ Kyoto Line	for Kyoto-kawaramachi
2	■ Kyoto Line	for Osaka-umeda, Tengachaya, Kita-Senri, Kobe-sannomiya, and Takarazuka

== Adjacent stations ==
«	Service	»
Hankyu Kyoto Line
Commuter Limited Express: Does not stop at this station
Limited Express: Does not stop at this station
Semi limited Express: Does not stop at this station
Express: Does not stop at this station
Takatsuki-shi	Semi-Express	Minase
Takatsuki-shi	Local	Minase

== History ==
The station opened on May 13, 1934, as Kanmaki-sakurainoeki Station (上牧桜井ノ駅駅, Kanmaki-sakurainoeki-eki) [sic]. It was renamed simply Kammaki Station on May 16, 1939.

Station numbering was introduced to all Hankyu stations on December 21, 2013, with this station being designated as station number HK-72.

== Passenger statistics ==
In fiscal 2019, the station was used by an average of 10,574 passengers daily

== Surrounding area ==
The station is located adjacent to the Tokaido Shinkansen high-speed line between Kyoto and Shin-Osaka stations.

== See also ==
- List of railway stations in Japan
