= Akechi clan =

Branch of the Toki clan

Akechi 明智
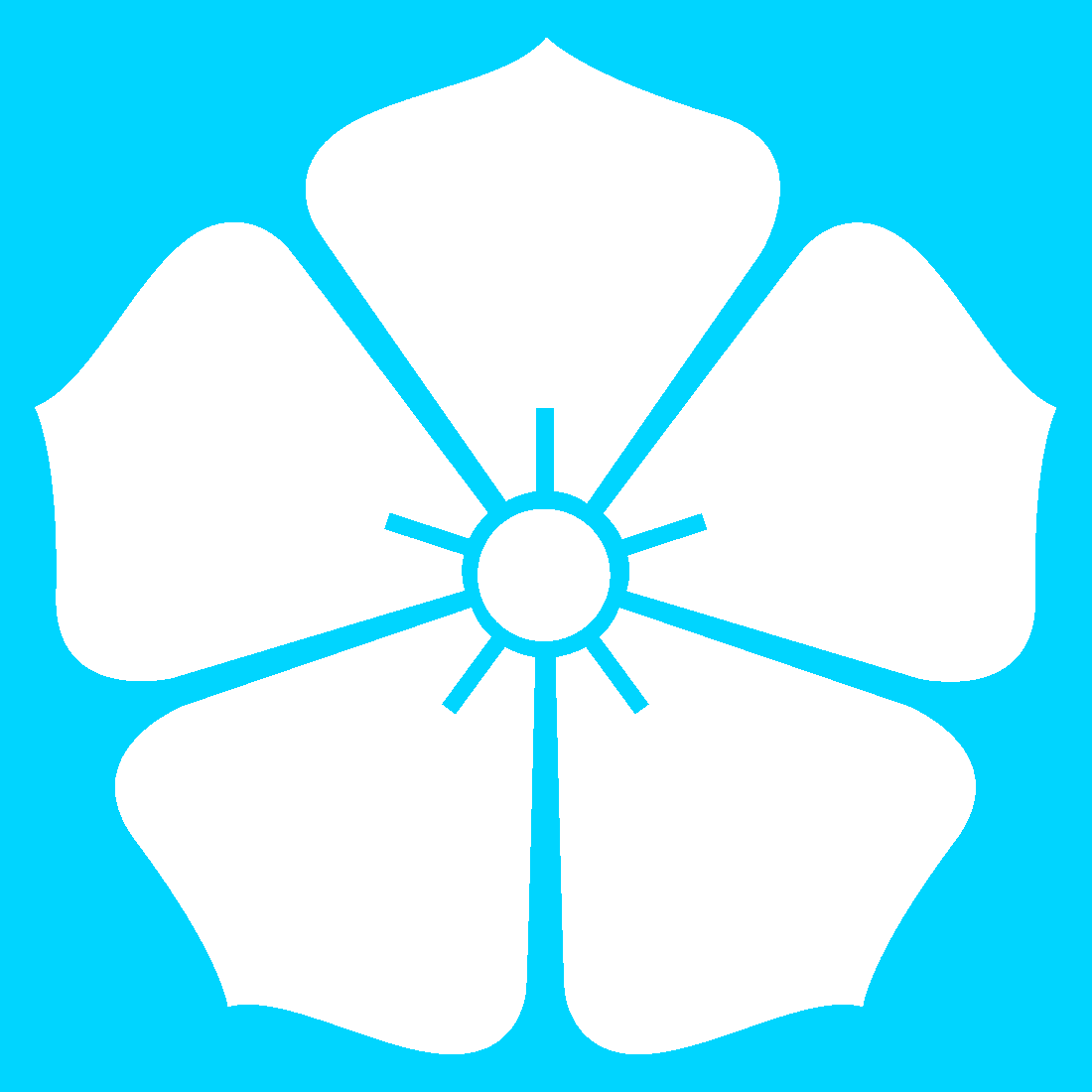
- The Akechi clan crest (mon)
- Home province: Mino
- Parent house: Toki clan
- Titles: Various
- Final ruler: Akechi Mitsuhide
- Ruled until: 1582, Battle of Yamazaki

The Akechi clan (明智氏, Akechi-shi) is a branch of the Toki clan, which is descended from the Seiwa Genji. The Akechi clan thrived around the later part of the Sengoku period of the 16th century. The Akechi became the head (soryo) of the Toki clan after the Toki fell to the Saitō clan in 1540. The Akechi refused to bend to the rule of Saitō Yoshitatsu who retaliated by attacking Nagayama castle. Akechi Mitsuhide then served the shoguns Ashikaga Yoshiteru and Ashikaga Yoshiaki. After introducing Ashikaga Yoshiaki to Oda Nobunaga, Mitsuhide became a powerful general under Nobunaga. However, in 1582, Mitsuhide betrayed Nobunaga at the temple of Honnō-ji and forced him to commit seppuku. The Akechi clan gained more power thanks to the collapse of the Oda clan. Later that same year, Akechi Mitsuhide was slain at the Battle of Yamazaki by the forces of Toyotomi Hideyoshi while his oldest son took his own life, a mere twelve days after the incident at Honnō-ji. The Akechi clan quickly fell from prominence after that.

== Genealogy ==
In the Akechi Family Tree recorded in "Zoku Gunsho Ruiju" and the "Mino no Kuni Shokki", it is said that the Akechi clan descended as branch of Toki clan of the Seiwa Genji clan, where the Toki clan served as shugo in Mino Province for over 200 years from the Kenmu Restoration, and has produced several dozen branches from then on. .

== Important figures ==
- Akechi Mitsutsugu, grandfather of Akechi Mitsuhide. Mitsutsugu was father of Omi-no-kata, wife of Saito Dosan.
- Akechi Mitsutsuna (died 1538), senior retainer under the Toki clan throughout the later Sengoku period of feudal Japan.
- Akechi Mitsuhide (c. 1520–1582), samurai who lived during the Sengoku period of Feudal Japan. Renowned for his betrayal of Oda Nobunaga.
- Akechi Hidemitsu (died 1582), retainer of the Akechi clan during the Azuchi-Momoyama period of feudal Japan.
- Akechi Mitsutada (died 1582), Japanese samurai of the Sengoku period who served the Akechi clan.
- Akechi Mitsuyoshi (died 1582), Japanese samurai of the Sengoku period, son of Akechi Mitsuhide, committed seppuku at the age of 12 or 13.
- Hosokawa Gracia (1563–1600), daughter of Akechi Mitsuhide and a famous Christian convert. Hosokawa Tadaoki's wife.

== Family tree ==
Minamoto no Yorimitsu	Eight generations	Toki Yorisada	Toki Yorimoto	Akechi Yorishige	Five generations
Mitsutsugu	Yoriaki
Mitsutsuna	Mitsuyasu	Mitsuhisa	Mitsushige	Omi no Kata
Mitsuhide	Akechi Nobutaka	Akechi Yasuhide	Mitsuharu	Mitsutada
Akechi Mitsuyoshi	Tsutsui Sadayori	Hidemitsu's wife	Mitsutada's wife	Hosokawa Gracia

For details, see Akechi Mitsuhide#Family

== Bibliography ==
- Taniguchi, Kengo (2014). 明智光秀. 歴史新書y. 洋泉社. ISBN 978-4800304216.

== See also ==
- Honnō-ji Incident (1582)
- Battle of Yamazaki (1582)
