= Mount Tennō =

Mountain in Kyoto Prefecture, Japan

Coordinates: 34.9019°N 135.6762°E

- Mount Tennōzan
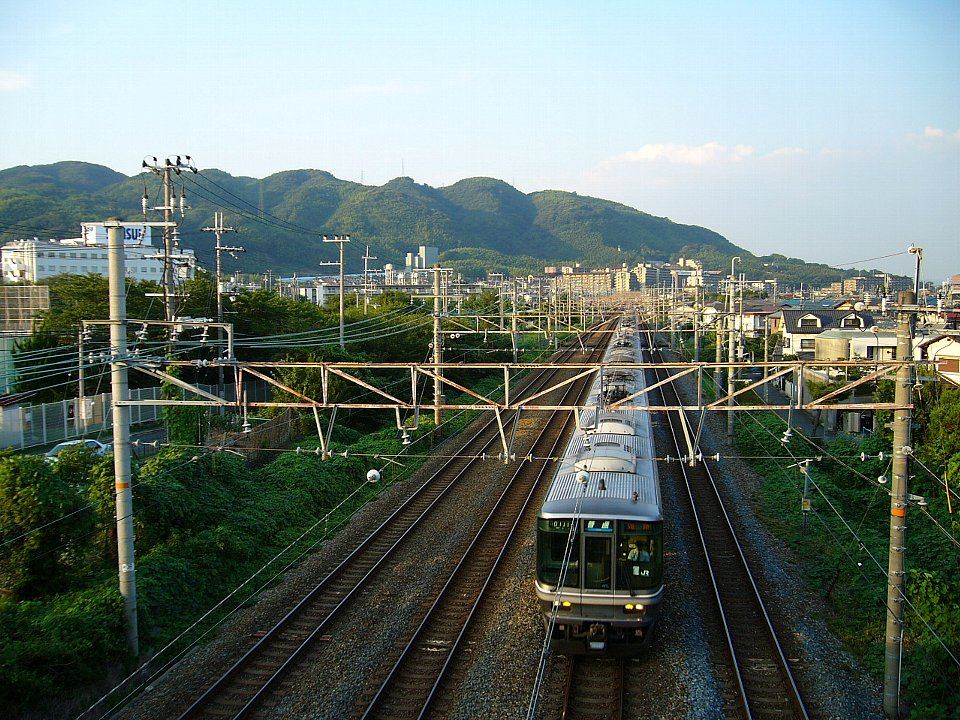

Highest point
- Elevation: 270 m (890 ft)

Naming
- Native name: 天王山 (てんのうざん)
- Pronunciation: [tè̞ńnó̞ò̞(d͡)zä̀ɴ̀, té̞ń-]

Geography
- Location: Ōyamazaki, Kyoto, Japan

Mount Tennō (天王山, Tennōzan), or Mount Tennōzan, is a mountain in Ōyamazaki, Kyoto, Japan. The name originates from a shrine on the mountain dedicated to Gozu Tennō, the ox-headed deity of disease and health.

== History ==
Throughout history, the mountain was a place of great strategic importance due to its location. Many wars were fought on its sides, including the Battle of Yamazaki between Toyotomi Hideyoshi and Akechi Mitsuhide. Due to its strategic location the Japanese phrase "Decisive as Tennōzan" (天下分け目の天王山) was born.
