= Mishima District, Osaka =

District in Ōsaka prefecture, Japan

Location of Mishima District in Osaka

Mishima (三島郡, Mishima-gun) is a district located in Osaka Prefecture, Japan.

As of 2009, the district has an estimated population of 29,003 and a density of 1,730 persons per square kilometre (4,500 per square mile). The total area is 16.78 km^{2} (6.48 sq mi).

== Town ==
- Shimamoto
