= Kaneyama Castle =

Castle ruins in Gifu, Japan

- 金山城
- Kani, Gifu Prefecture, Japan
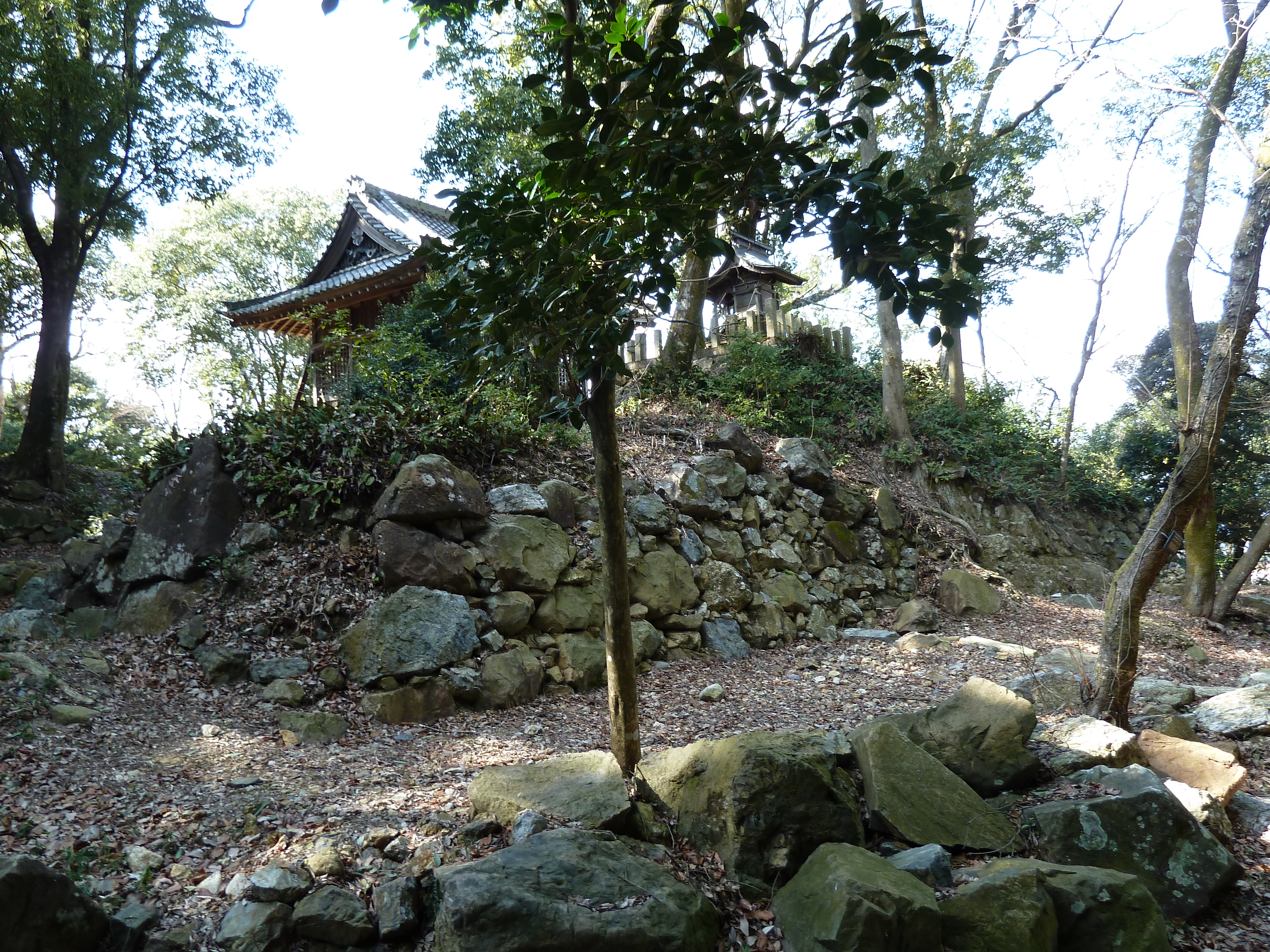
- Ruins of Kaneyama Castle

Site information
- Type: Yamajiro-style Japanese castle
- Controlled by: Saitō clan, Mori clan
- Open to the public: yes
- Condition: ruins

Location
- Coordinates: 35°30′47″N 137°29′07″E

Site history
- Built: 1537
- Built by: Saito Masayoshi
- In use: Sengoku period
- Demolished: c.1603

Mino Kaneyama Castle (美濃金山城, Mino Kaneyama-jō) was a Sengoku period Japanese castle located in Kani, Gifu Prefecture, Japan. In 1981, the ruins were designated as a National Historic Site. It was also known as Karasumine Castle (烏峰城, Karasumine-jō).

== Background ==
Kaneyama Castle is located on the 273-meter Mount Kojo next to the Kiso River in former Mino Province, at the northeastern end of the Nōbi Plain near the center of modern Gifu Prefecture. The castle commanded a fork in the road connecting the Nakasendō highway with the Masuda kaidō, a road connecting Mino and Hida Provinces. The site is approximately a 60 minute walk from Akechi Station on the Meitetsu Hiromi Line railway.

Kaneyama Castle was a mountain-top fortification with a roughly square inner bailey approximately 50 meters square, with a wide entrance to the east. A tenshu or watchtower existed near this entrances, connected to the barracks. Secondary and tertiary enclosures were to the west of the inner bailey, using the natural slope of the mountain and masugata box-gates, and stone walls for defense. To the east of the inner bailey was a large flat area, which may have been used for storage or for drilling troops. Past this area was a long, narrow secondary redoubt. In total, the castle extended for 300 meters across the mountaintop.

== History ==
A castle was built on this location in 1537 by Saitō Masayoshi, the son of Saitō Dōsan. However, he was murdered by Toki Eigoro of neighboring Kukuri Castle in 1548 and the castle was without a master for some time. When the Saitō clan was destroyed by Oda Nobunaga, Kaneyama was awarded to Nobunaga's general, Mori Yoshinari, in 1565. Mori Yoshinari renovated the castle and renamed it "Kaneyama". Yoshinari fought in many of Nobunaga's battles and was a distinguished commander, but he fell in battle against the combined Azai-Asakura forces, along with armed monks, in 1570, and was succeeded by second his son, Mori Nagayoshi. Under Nagayoshi, the castle was expanded, and Nobunaga appointed Nagayoshi as the lord over eastern Mino Province. Nobunaga also accepted his younger brother Mori Ranmaru as one of his pages.

Nagayoshi was noted for his violent temper and ruthlessness in battle, even to the point of killing men on his own side who got in the way of his target. During the campaign against Takatō Castle, he ordered his gunners to shoot down any fleeing or surrendering enemy. Following the destruction of the Takeda clan, he was rewarded with northern Shinano Province and relocated to Kaizu Castle (the site of current Matsushiro Castle) where he earned the sobriquet of "Demon" for his ruthless suppression of a local uprising.

After Nobunaga's assassination, the minor lords of Shinano rose in open revolt and Nagayoshi was forced to flee back to Mino Province, where he murdered the sons of the Shinano lords whom he had held as hostages. Two years later, Nagayoshi and his father-in-law Ikeda Tsuneoki decided to support Toyotomi Hideyoshi over Oda Nobukatsu and seized Inuyama Castle across the Kiso River in Owari Province. To protect his rear against the attack by Tokugawa Ieyasu, Nagayoshi reformed Kaneyama Castle with additional dry moats and clay ramparts. Both Nagayoshi and Ikeda Tsuneoki fell during the Battle of Komaki and Nagakute of 1584. Before the battle, Nagayoshi left a will stating that in case of his death, Kaneyama Castle was to be assigned to one of his generals, and that under no circumstances was his younger brother, Mori Tadamasa to inherit. Hideyoshi ignored the will and allowed Tadamasa to succeed. Subsequently, Tadamasa was reassigned to Kaizu Castle, and then to Bitchu Province, where he built Tsuyama Castle.

The castle was abandoned around the start of the Tokugawa shogunate, and many of its buildings and stone walls were dismantled and reused to repair Inuyama Castle. One of the gates originally from Kaneyama Castle has been preserved as a gate to the temple of Zuisen-ji in Inuyama. At the site of Kaneyama Castle are only a few broken stone ruins and foundations, and some traces of the moats. The site of the tenshu is now occupied by a Shinto shrine

The castle was listed as one of the Continued Top 100 Japanese Castles in 2017.

== Gallery ==
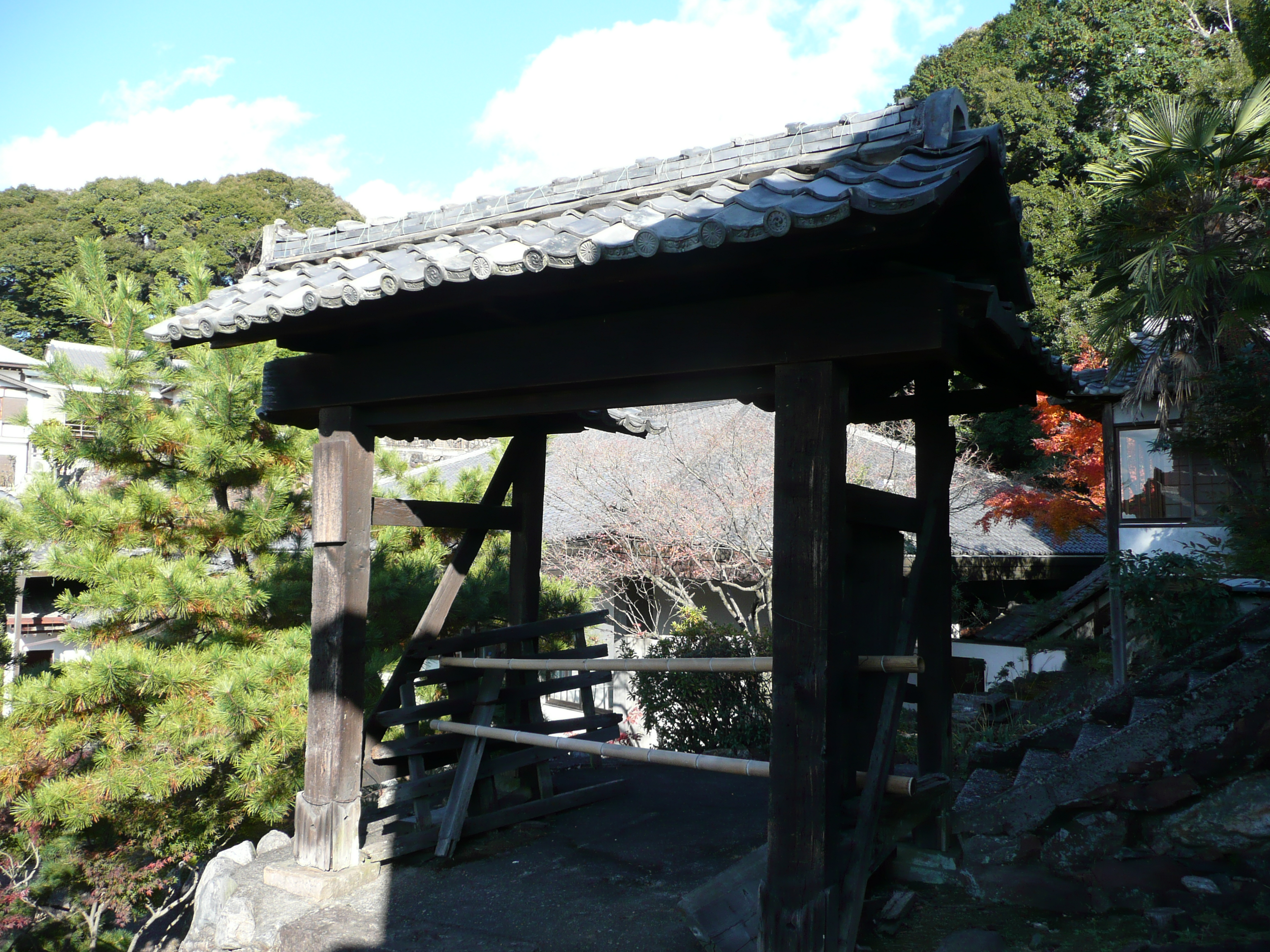
surviving gate

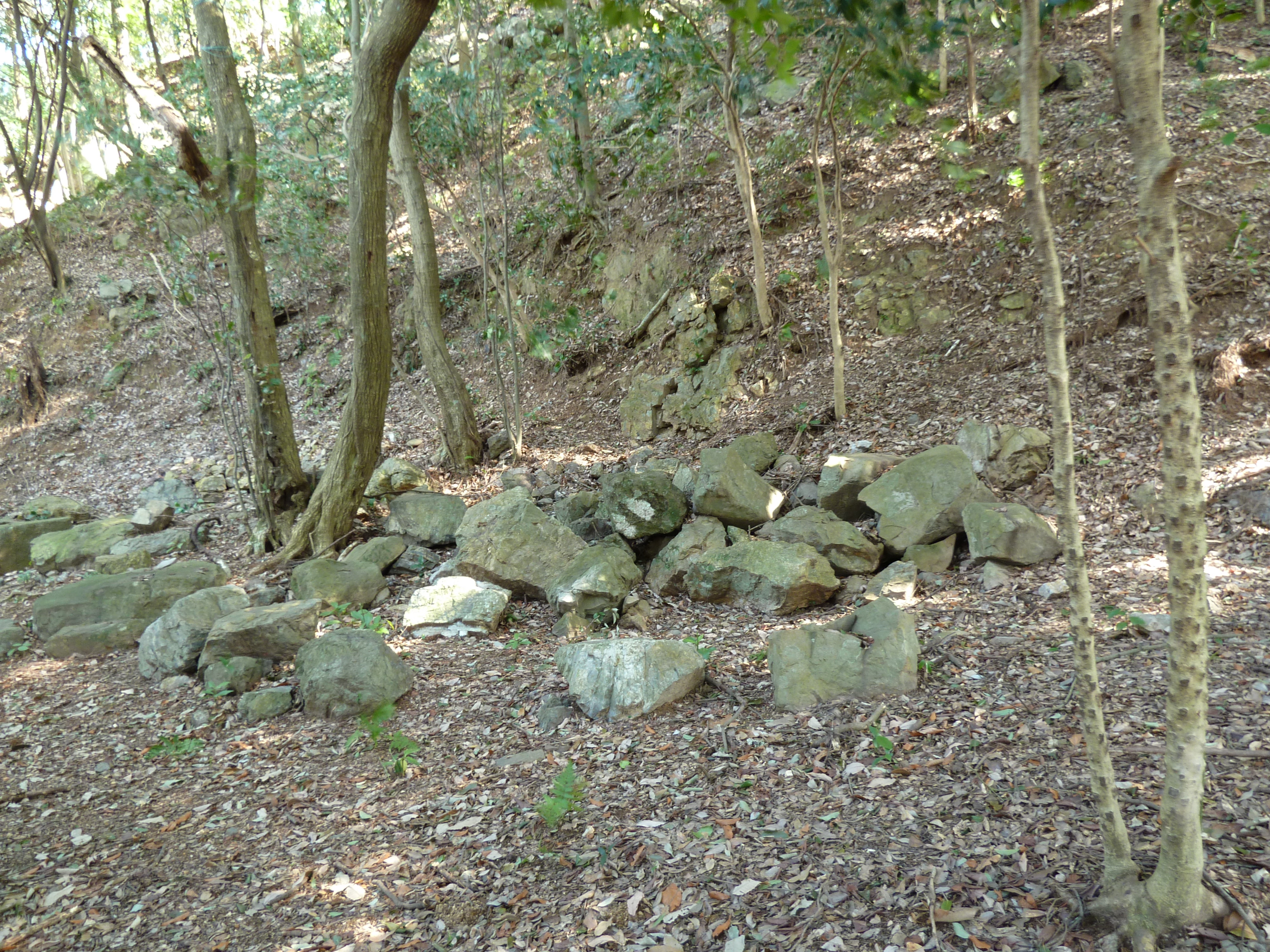
remnants of stone walls

== See also ==
- List of Historic Sites of Japan (Gifu)
