= Ikeda Sen =

Japanese female Samurai

- 池田せん
- Crest of the Ikeda clan

Personal life
- Born: 1560s
- Died: 1640s
- Spouse: Mori Nagayoshi; Nakamura Kazuuji
- Children: Nakamura Kazutada
- Parent: Ikeda Tsuneoki (father)

Religious life
- Religion: Buddhism
- Dharma name: Anyōin (若御前)
- Military career
- Allegiance: Oda clan Toyotomi clan Tokugawa clan
- Unit: Ikeda clan
- Commands: Commander of a female Teppō unit
- Conflicts: Battle of Yamazaki; Battle of Shizugatake; Battle of Komaki and Nagakute; Battle of Gifu Castle

Ikeda Sen (池田 せん; birth unknown – 1640s), or Anyōin (安養院), was a late-Sengoku period onna-musha. She was the daughter of Ikeda Tsuneoki and the older sister of Ikeda Terumasa. Mori Nagayoshi (older brother of Mori Ranmaru) was her first husband. She was a woman trained in martial arts and was commander of a unit that consisted of 200 female musketeers (Teppō unit)

Despite having little historical record about her life, Ikeda Sen is described as a female samurai who participated in notable military campaigns and received 10,000 koku, being a female lord or a possible daimyo.

== Genealogy ==
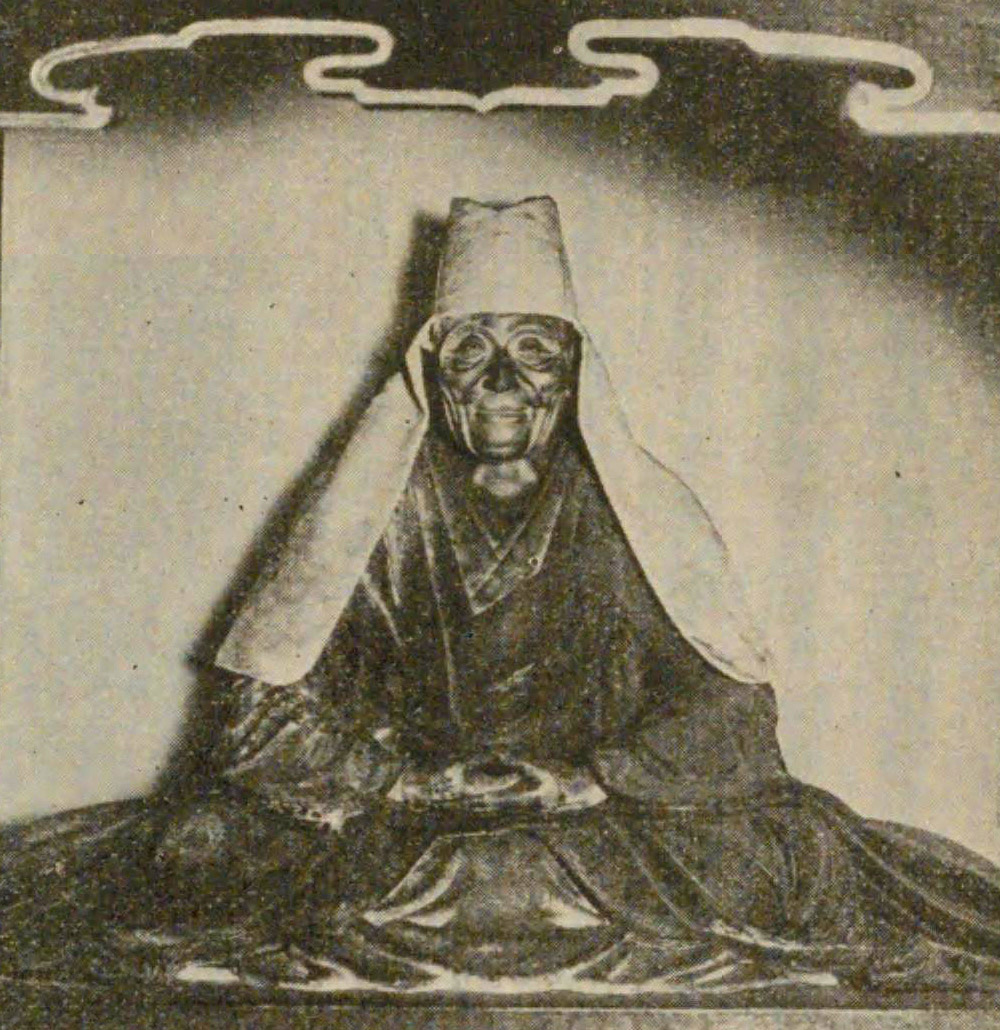
Yōtoku-in Wooden Statue in Kuniseiji Temple.

Ikeda Sen's grandmother, Yōtoku-in (養徳院), was the wet nurse (foster mother) of Oda Nobunaga, a major daimyo. Yōtoku-in's position as Nobunaga's foster mother, exacerbated the wealth of the Ikeda clan and its political influence.

Sen's father, Ikeda Tsuneoki, served Oda Nobuhide, Oda Nobunaga, and Toyotomi Hideyoshi. He was one of the elders of Kiyosu Castle, and later became the lord of Inuyama and Ogaki Castles. Her younger brother, Ikeda Terumasa would become the lord of Yoshida Castle in Mikawa province.

Sen's brother, Terumasa, was offered a powerful political marriage, he married Tokugawa Tokuhime, the daughter of Tokugawa Ieyasu, and would become known as the ''Shogun of the West'' after building the remaining Himeji castle.

Ikeda Sen's first husband, Mori Nagayoshi, was also a famous samurai serving the Oda family. Nagayoshi served the Oda shortly after inheriting the Mori clan and became famous for his monstrous strength and ferocity. His reputation with his fellow retainers varies between a foul mannered ruffian to a man of refined penmanship. His younger brother was Nobunaga's closest page, Mori Ranmaru.

== Life ==
Although her direct military participation lacks definitive contemporary evidence, historical tradition attributes to her skills that were uncommon for women of the time, notably the mastery of firearms (teppō). Anecdotal accounts suggest she led units of musketeers in several decisive conflicts during the rise of Toyotomi Hideyoshi:

- Battle of Yamazaki (1582): Following the Honnō-ji Incident, she reportedly volunteered for Hideyoshi's forces in the campaign against Akechi Mitsuhide.
- Battle of Shizugatake (1583): Traditional historiography records her participation with a musketeer unit in the defense of Gifu Castle, alongside the forces of Oda Nobukatsu.
- Battle of Komaki and Nagakute (1584): During this conflict, she is said to have commanded a unit of approximately 200 women. The battle resulted in the deaths of her father, Ikeda Tsuneoki, and her husband. After the clash, her brother, Ikeda Terumasa, assumed leadership of the clan.

After Nagayoshi's death, Sen married one of the three main members of the Toyotomi government, daimyo Nakamura Kazuuji, who was born in Nakamura-ku, Nagoya. During her marriage, Sen gave birth to two children. Her most notable son was Nakamura Kazutada, the first lord who ruled the Yonago Domain. Kazutada married Ieyasu's adopted daughter, further strengthening the relations between the Ikeda clan and the Tokugawa clan even more. Sen's husband, Nakamura Kazuuji, died in August 1600, just before the Battle of Sekigahara.

After the death of her second husband, she became a Buddhist nun, changing her name to Annyo-in (若 御前). She remained in the Nakamura clan.

=== Sekigahara Campaign ===
When the Sekigahara Campaign began in the fall of 1600, Sen's brother and Sen's son immediately sided with Tokugawa. There is no evidence, but according to various sources, Ikeda Sen is said to have led her squad of women musketeers in the Battle of Sekigahara. If the speculation that she was present in the Sekigahara Campaign is true, she probably participated in the Battle of Gifu Castle alongside her brother and Fukushima Masanori.

Following the Eastern Army's victory at the Battle of Sekigahara, the Nakamura family was rewarded with an estate valued at 175,000 koku. However, when Ikeda Sen's son died of illness without a male heir, the property faced confiscation by the Tokugawa shogunate under the laws of the period. To secure her livelihood, Sen temporarily seized control of the castle and mobilized her personal retinue of women, whom she had trained in firearms, to confront the Shogun's emissaries.

Intimidated by the armed display, the envoy reported the situation to Edo. Impressed by her resolve, the Shogun relented and officially granted Sen a retirement pension. According to the early Edo-period manuscript Tōdaiki (当代記, "The Present Chronicles"), which records the rice revenues of various warriors, Sen received land in her own right with a yield equivalent to 10,000 koku. This exceptionally high income for a female warrior effectively placed her revenue on par with that of a minor daimyo.

Sen survived the entire Period of Warring States, dying in 17th-century. It is speculated that she lived for more than 80 years, due to the last records of her life being written around 1640, records written in the historiographies of Matsudaira Tadaaki.

== In popular culture ==
- Ikeda Sen appears in the Koei Tecmo video game Samurai Warriors 4 Empires and Nobunaga's Ambition.

== See also ==
- List of female castellans in Japan
