= Mori Yoshinari =

Japanese samurai

- 森 可成
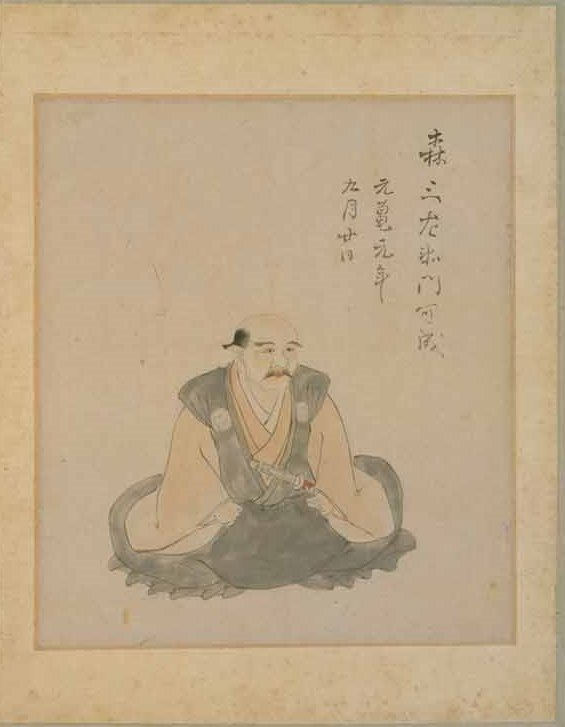

Head of Mori clan (Genji)
- In office 1555–1570
- Preceded by: Mori Yoshiyuki
- Succeeded by: Mori Nagayoshi

Lord of Kaneyama Castle
- In office 1565–1570
- Preceded by: Saito Masayoshi
- Succeeded by: Mori Nagayoshi

Personal details
- Born: 1523 Mino Province
- Died: October 19, 1570 (aged 46–47) Siege of Usayama Castle, Omi Province
- Spouse: Ei (later known as Myōkōni)
- Children: Mori Yoshitaka; Mori Nagayoshi; Mori Ranmaru; Mori Bōmaru; Mori Rikimaru; Mori Tadamasa

Military service
- Allegiance: Saitō clan Oda clan
- Unit: Mori clan (Genji)
- Commands: Kaneyama Castle
- Battles/wars: Battle of Kanōguchi (1547); Battle of Ino (1556); Siege of Inabayama (1567); Siege of Shōryūji Castle (1568); Battle of Anegawa (1570); Siege of Usayama Castle (1570)

Mori Yoshinari (森 可成; 1523 – October 19, 1570) was a Japanese samurai of the Sengoku period and the head of the Mori clan (Genji) family, who served the Saitō clan. The Saitō were the lords of Mino province. Later, he became a retainer of Oda Nobunaga.

== Military life ==
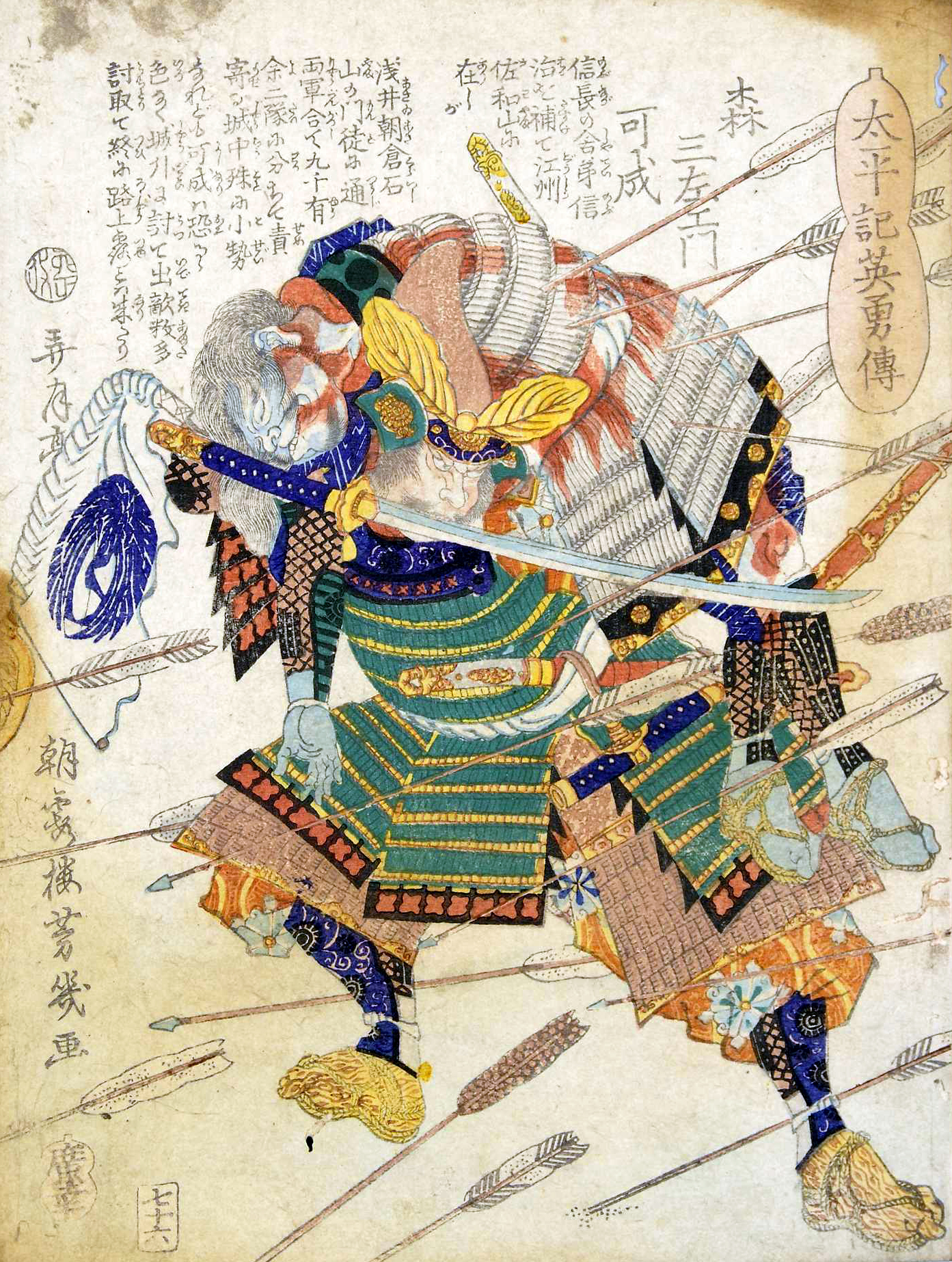
Mori Yoshinari battle of Usayama Castle

In 1547, he fought at the Battle of Kanōguchi against the Oda clan under Saitō Dōsan.

In 1555, Yoshinari and his family became retainers of Oda Nobunaga. He defected towards Oda Nobunaga for unknown reasons.

In 1556, He fought in the Battle of Ino against Oda Nobuyuki.

In 1567, he was helping Oda Nobunaga to overthrow the Saitō clan at the Siege of Inabayama Castle against Saitō Tatsuoki.

In late 1568, Yoshinari joined Shibata Katsuie, Hachiya Yoritaka, Hosokawa Fujitaka and Sakai Masahisa in attacking Iwanari Tomomichi at Shōryūji Castle.

In 1570, Yoshinari fought in the Battle of Anegawa against the Asakura clan and the Azai clan.

== Death ==
In 1570, Yoshinari died fighting in the Battle of Shimosakamoto at Usayama Castle against the Azai clan and the Asakura clan near Ōtsu in the aftermath of the Battle of Anegawa.

Yoshinari was the father of the Oda's samurai Mori Nagayoshi and Mori Ranmaru. After Yoshinari died, Mori Nagayoshi took over the leadership of the clan, but he later died in the Battle of Nagakute in 1584.

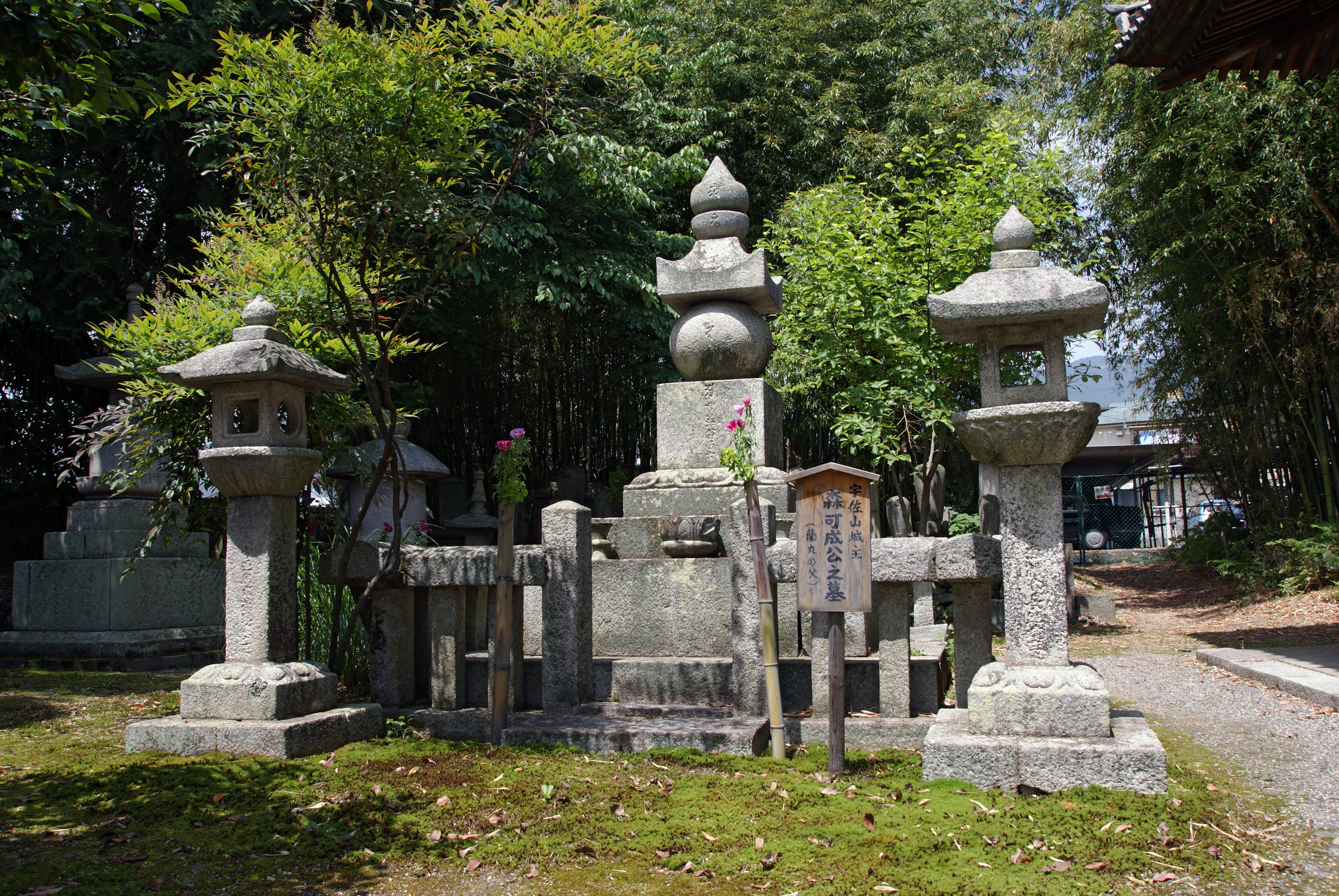
Grave of Mori Yoshinari

== Family ==
- Father: Mori Yoshiyuki (d. 1571)
- Siblings:
  - Mori Yoshimasa (1560–1623)
- Wife: Myōkōni (d. 1596)
- Sons:
  - Mori Yoshitaka (1552–1570)
  - Mori Nagayoshi (1558–1584)
  - Mori Ranmaru (1565–1582)
  - Mori Bōmaru (1566–1582)
  - Mori Rikimaru (1567–1582)
  - Mori Tadamasa (1570–1634)
