= Tokuhime =

Tokuhime may refer to:

- Tokuhime (Oda) (徳姫) (1559–1636), daughter of Oda Nobunaga; also known as Gotokuhime
- Tokuhime (Tokugawa) (督姫) (1565–1615), daughter of Tokugawa Ieyasu
- Tokuhime (Matsudaira) (登久姫) (1576–1607), daughter of Matsudaira Nobuyasu and Tokuhime (Oda)
