= Ikeda Terumasa =

Daimyo

- 池田 輝政
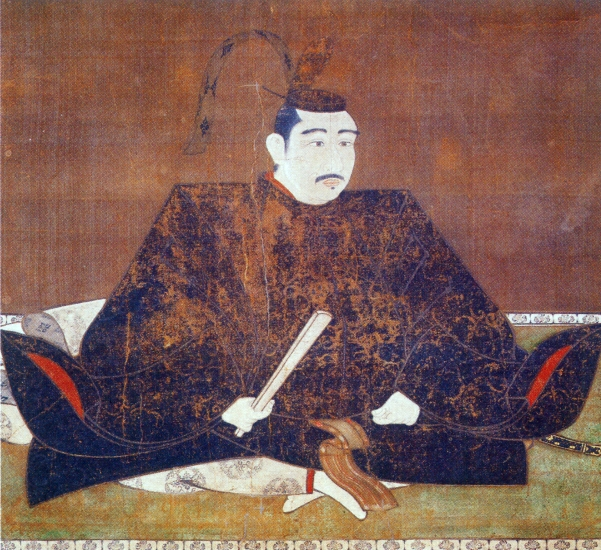

Daimyō of Himeji
- In office 1600–1613
- Preceded by: none
- Succeeded by: Ikeda Toshitaka

Personal details
- Born: January 31, 1565
- Died: March 16, 1613 (aged 48)
- Spouse: Toku Hime
- Children: 11
- Parents: Ikeda Tsuneoki (father); Zen'ōin (mother)
- Relatives: Ikeda Sen (sister)
- Nickname: Saigoku no shōgun

Military service
- Allegiance: Toyotomi clan Tokugawa clan Eastern Army
- Unit: Mino-Ikeda family
- Battles/wars: Battle of Komaki and Nagakute (1584); Imjin war (1592; Battle of Gifu Castle (1600); Battle of Sekigahara (1600)

Ikeda Terumasa (池田 輝政; January 31, 1565 – March 16, 1613) was a Japanese daimyō of the early Edo period. His court title was Musashi no Kami. Terumasa was also known by the nickname saigoku no shōgun, or, "The Shōgun of Western Japan". Terumasa fought in many of the battles of the late Azuchi–Momoyama period, and due to his service at the Battle of Sekigahara, received a fief at Himeji. His childhood name was Araokojimaru (荒尾古新丸). He was the son of Ikeda Tsuneoki and brother of Ikeda Sen.

== Biography ==
Terumasa was the second son and heir of Ikeda Nobuteru (Ikeda Tsuneoki). Terumasa held the Ikejiri Castle (Mino Province).

In 1579, during the Siege of Itami (1574), Terumasa was stationed at Settsukura Bridge with his father. Later in 1580, during the Siege of Hanakuma castle, they camped at Kitasuwagamine, and on March 2, Terumasa notably killed six enemies personally during the battle. Due to his military exploits, he was awarded a letter of commendation from Oda Nobunaga.

In 1584 on April 9, during the Battle of Nagakute, Terumasa served under the Ikeda Tsuneoki and Mori Nagayoshi who commanded 3,000 and 2,000 soldiers respectively. During this battle, Nagayoshi was shot and killed in action, while Tsuneoki was killed with spear by Nagai Naokatsu. Terumasa was then persuaded by his vassals to retreat. Eventually, the Tsuneoki and Mori forces were crushed, and the battle ended in victory for the Tokugawa forces.

In 1590, following the move of Tokugawa Ieyasu to the Kanto region, Terumasa was granted Yoshida in Mikawa, a 152,000-koku fief. In 1594 Terumasa married one of Tokugawa's daughters, and after Hideyoshi died in 1598, the Ikeda family drifted into Ieyasu's camp.

In 1592, Terumasa participated in the Japanese invasions of Korea. He stayed in the castle and was in charge of guarding the east of Japan. For the invasion of Korea, Terumasa was ordered to build large ships and transport provisions and rice to Nagoya Castle. He also worked on constructing Fushimi Castle and Toyotomi Hideyasu's Yamatotanai Castle.

In 1594, Terumasa married Tokuhime, the daughter of Tokugawa Ieyasu, with Hideyoshi's mediation.

=== Conflict with Ishida Mitsunari ===
According to popular theory, in 1598, after the death of Toyotomi Hideyoshi, the government of Japan was shalen by an incident, when seven military generals—Fukushima Masanori, Katō Kiyomasa, Ikeda Terumasa, Hosokawa Tadaoki, Asano Yoshinaga, Katō Yoshiaki, and Kuroda Nagamasa—conspired to kill Ishida Mitsunari. Supposedly the group was disstatisfied with Mitsunari, as he wrote bad assessments and underreported the achievements of those generals during the Imjin war against Korea and the Chinese empire. However, despite the classical historiographic depiction of the event as "seven generals against Mitsunari", modern historian Watanabe Daimon has pointed out there were more generals involved, such as Hachisuka Iemasa, Tōdō Takatora, and Kuroda Yoshitaka, who also brought their troops and entourage to confront Mitsunari.

At first, these generals gathered at Kiyomasa's mansion in Osaka Castle, and from there moved to attack Mitsunari's mansion. However, Mitsunari had knowledge of the conspiracy through a report from a servant of Toyotomi Hideyori, and hid in Satake Yoshinobu's mansion together with Shima Sakon and others. When the conspirators found out that Mitsunari was not in his mansion, they searched the mansions of various feudal lords in Osaka Castle, and Kato's army also approached the Satake residence. Mitsunari and his party escaped and barricaded themselves at Fushimi Castle. The next day, the seven generals surrounded Fushimi Castle with their soldiers as they knew Mitsunari was hiding there. Tokugawa Ieyasu, who was in charge of political affairs in Fushimi Castle tried to arbitrate the situation. The seven generals requested Ieyasu to hand over Mitsunari, which was refused. Ieyasu then negotiated the promise to let Mitsunari retire and to review the assessment of the Battle of Ulsan Castle, which had been the major source of this incident, and had his second son, Yūki Hideyasu, escort Mitsunari to Sawayama Castle.

However, modern historians such as Daimon, Junji Mitsunari, and Goki Mizuno state that, from the primary and secondary sources about the incident, it was more of legal conflict between those generals and Mitsunari, rather than a conspiracy to murder him. The role of Ieyasu was not to protect him from any physical harm, but to mediate the complaints of the seven generals.

Nevertheless, historians viewed this incident not just as simply personal problems between the seven generals and Mitsunari, but rather as an extension of the political rivalries between the Tokugawa faction and the anti-Tokugawa faction led by Mitsunari. After the incident, military figures on bad terms with Mitsunari would support Ieyasu during the Sekigahara campaign between the Eastern Army led by Tokugawa Ieyasu and the Western Army led by Ishida Mitsunari. According to Muramatsu Shunkichi, writer of The Surprising Passions and Desires of the Heroes and Heroines of Japanese History, the reason for Mitsunari failure in his war against Ieyasu was his unpopularity among the major political figures of that time.

When the Sekigahara Campaign began in the fall of 1600, Terumasa immediately sided with his father-in-law, Tokugawa. He also managed to convince Nakagawa Hidenari to side with Ieyasu during the conflict.

In August 21, the Eastern Army, led by Terumasa Ikeda, began crossing the river from Kawada. Terumasa's army engaged in a battle at Yoneno against Oda Hidenobu. After the Hidenobu's army routed, the Eastern army crossed the river and directly attacked Takegahana Castle at 9:00 AM on the August 22nd. Shigekatsu himself set the castle on fire and committed suicide as a final act of defiance.

At the Battle of Sekigahara, Ikeda commanded 4,560 troops in the rear guard and saw some desultory fighting with Chosokabe Morichika's contingent as the battle wound down.

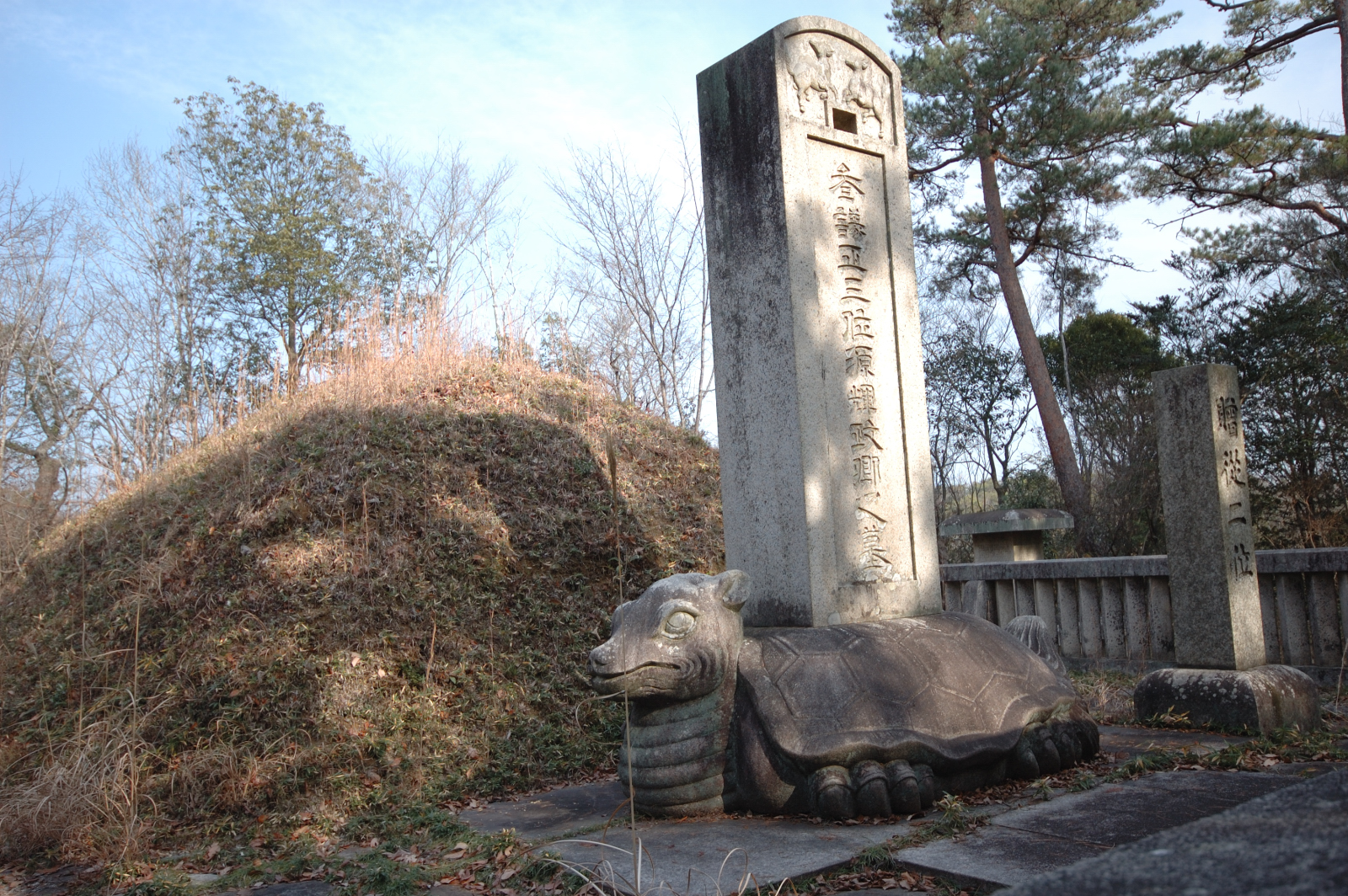
Grave of Ikeda Terumasa

After the battle ended with the victory of the Eastern Army, Terumasa and Asano Yukinaga pursued Morichika who fled to Mount Tarao. However, Morichika managed to shake his pursuers tail throughout Iga and Izumi, before retreating to Tenma in Osaka and finally returning to his home town, Tosa.

Following the Tokugawa victory, Terumasa was given a 520,000-koku fief and the province of Harima. He also rewarded by his father-in-law, Ieyasu, with Himeji Castle. which he expanded and completed in 1609. In 1603 Bizen was added to Terumasa's territory, which he assigned to his eldest son, Toshitaka (1584–1616).

By the time of Terumasa's death in 1613, the Ikeda had grown to rule over Harima, Bizen, Inaba, and Awaji, with a combined income of around 1,000,000-koku.

Following the death of Toshitaka, the Tokugawa Bakufu took steps to reduce the power of the Ikeda and eventually reduced the family to Tottori (Inaba) and Okayama (Bizen).

== Ōkanehira sword ==
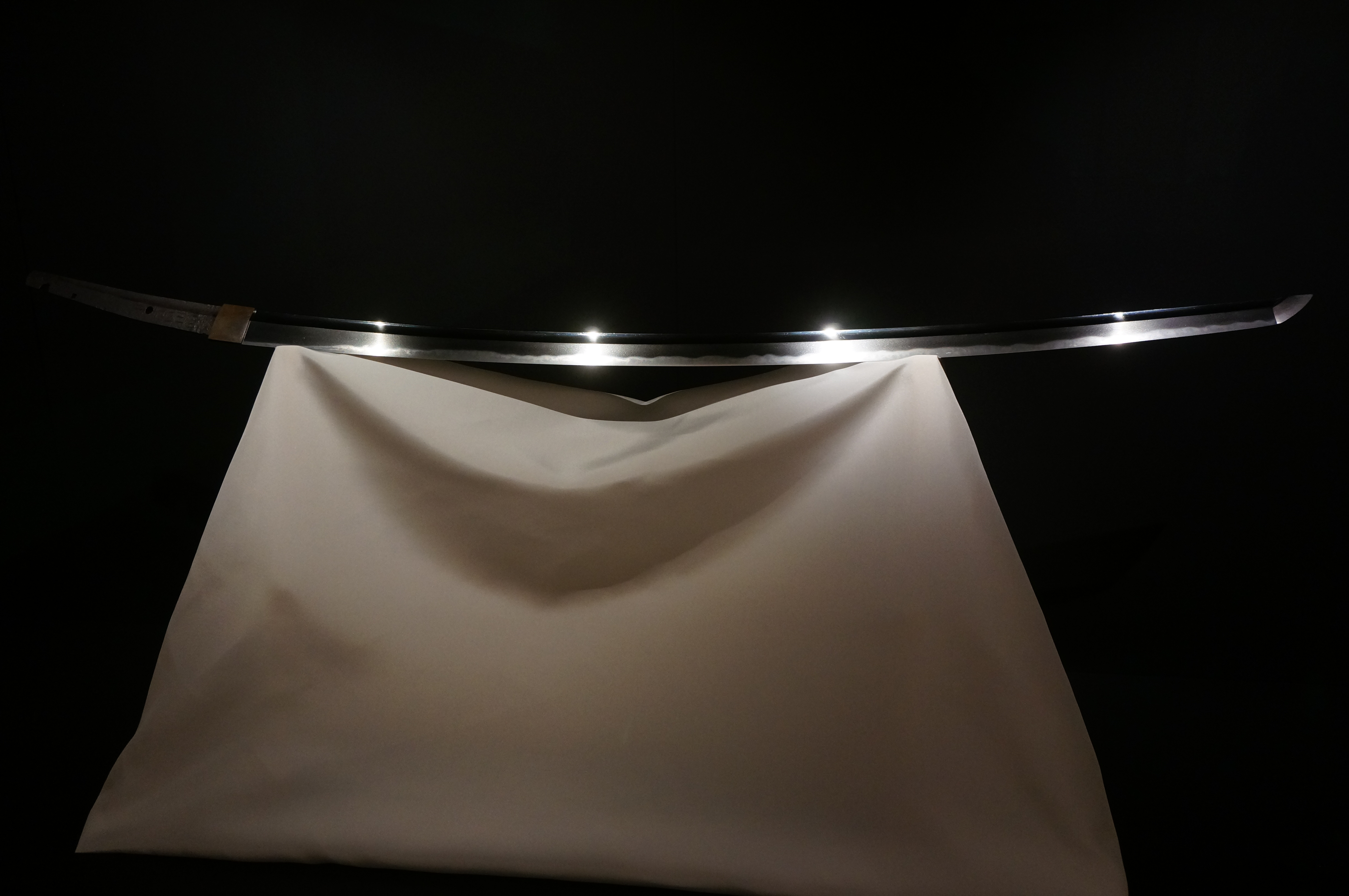
Ōkanehira

Ōkanehira is a tachi that was once owned by Ikeda Terumasa. It was forged by Kanehira, a member of the Ko-Bizen (old Bizen) school of the Bizen school during the Heian period. Due to the sword's exceptional quality, the prefix "Ō" (meaning "great") was added to the smith's name, resulting in the name Ōkanehira. The sword is often considered the finest Japanese sword from an artistic standpoint and is frequently compared with Dōjigiri, as one of the greatest examples of Japanese sword craftsmanship. Together, they are sometimes referred to as the "yokozuna of Japanese swords," referencing the highest rank in sumo wrestling and implying unmatched excellence. It has been designated a National Treasure and is housed in the Tokyo National Museum.

== Family ==
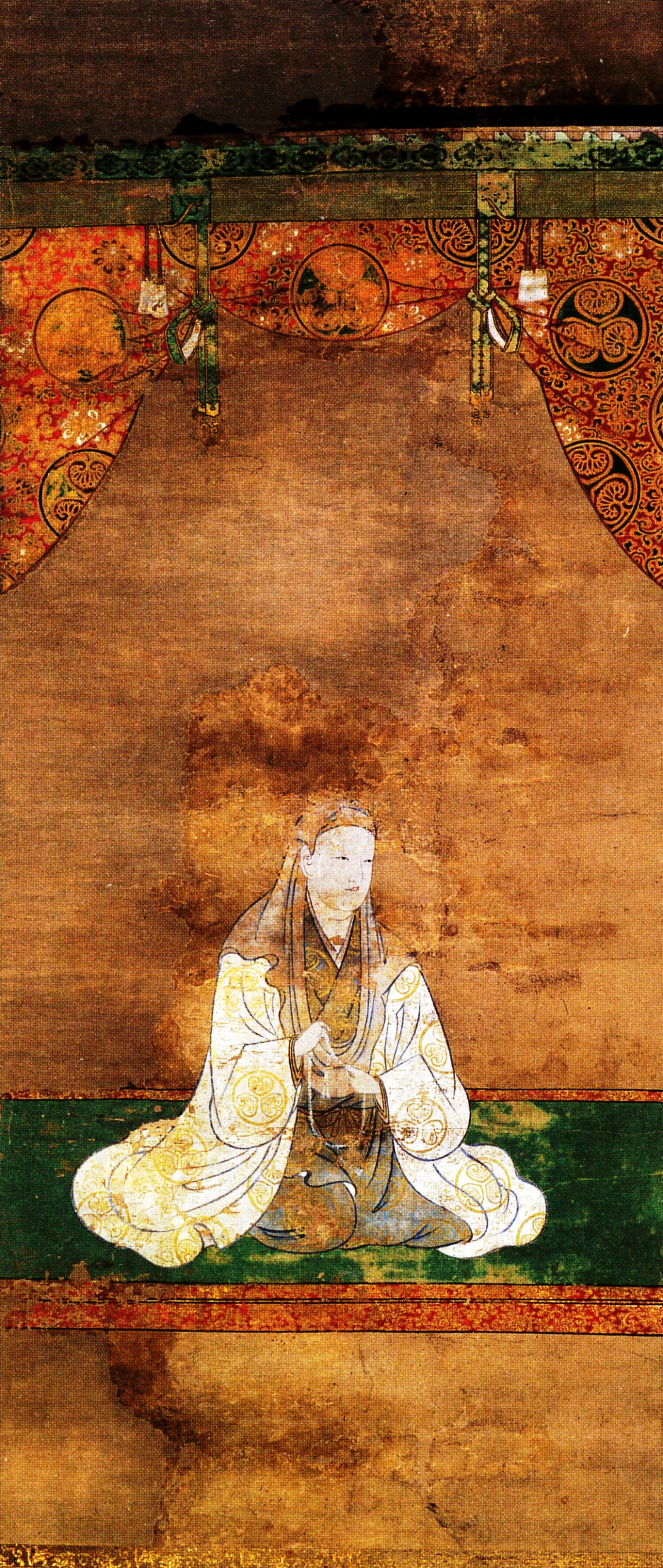
Toku-Hime after taking tonsure

- Wives:
  - Itohime, daughter of Nakagawa Kiyohide
  - Tokuhime (Tokugawa)
- Concubines:
  - Manganin
  - Daughter of Ando clan
- Children:
  - Ikeda Toshitaka (1584–1616) by Itohime
  - Ikeda Tadatsugu (1599–1615) by Tokuhime
  - Ikeda Teruzumi (1604–1662) by Tokuhime
  - Ikeda Masatsuna (1605–1631) by Tokuhime
  - Ikeda Tadakatsu (1602–1632) by Tokuhime
  - Ikeda Teruoki (1611–1647) by Tokuhime
  - Chacha-hime married Kyogoku Takahiro by Tokuhime
  - Furihime (1607–1659) married Date Tadamune by Tokuhime
  - Ikeda Masatora (1590–1635) by Manganin
  - Ikeda Toshimasa (1594–1639) by daughter of Ando clan
  - Ikeda Terutaka

== Bibliography ==
- Okada Masato (1999). 織田信長総合事典 [Oda Nobunaga Comprehensive Encyclopedia]. 雄山閣.
- Kōhei Murakawa (2000). 日本近世武家政権論 [Theory of Early Modern Japanese Samurai Government]. 近代文芸社.
- Taniguchi, Sumio (1999). 織田信長総合事典. 雄山閣.
- 山本大 (Yamamoto Dai) (1988). 長宗我部元親 [Chosokabe Motochika] (新装版 ed.). 吉川弘文館. ISBN 4642051031.
