= Mori (Genji clan) =

Japanese family descended from the Seiwa Genji

Mori 森氏
- Mon: Tsuru-no-maru (鶴の丸)
- Home province: Sagami Province, Aikō District
- Parent house: Minamoto clan (Seiwa Genji)
- Founder: Mori Yorisada

The Mori clan (森氏, Mori-shi) was a family of Japanese people descended from the Seiwa Genji. Their line descended from Minamoto no Yoshiie (also known as Hachimantaro) through his seventh son, Minamoto no Yoshitaka, proprietor of Mōri-no-shō in Sagami Province. His son, Minamoto no Yoritaka, took Mori as his surname when he retired, and Yoritaka's son Yorisada continued to use the surname.

During the Sengoku period, the Mori served under Oda Nobunaga. Mori Yoshinari fought with Nobunaga for Kiyosu Castle, and with his son Mori Yoshitaka joined the campaigns against the Saitō, Azai, and Asakura. Father and son died in the battle against the Azai-Asakura armies, and Mori Nagayoshi, second son of Yoshinari, became head of the house.

Yoshinari's sons, known as Mori Ranmaru, Mori Bōmaru, and Mori Rikimaru, died with Nobunaga in Incident at Honnō-ji.

The family became daimyōs under Toyotomi Hideyoshi, and for five generations headed the Tsuyama Domain in Mimasaka Province as tozama daimyō. Nagayoshi had lost his life in the Battle of Komaki and Nagakute. Their descendants became viscounts in the Meiji peerage.

== Notable members ==
- Mori Yoshinari (1523–1570)
- Mori Yoshitaka (1552–1570)
- Mori Nagayoshi (1558–1584)
- Mori Ranmaru (1565–1582)
- Mori Bōmaru (1566–1582)
- Mori Rikimaru (1567–1582)
- Mori Tadamasa (1570–1634)
