= Mori Nagayoshi =

Japanese samurai officer (1558–1584)

- 森 長可
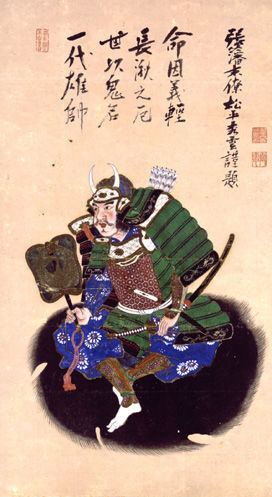

Head of Mori clan (Genji)
- In office 1570–1584
- Preceded by: Mori Yoshinari
- Succeeded by: Mori Tadamasa

Personal details
- Born: 1558
- Died: May 18, 1584 (aged 25–26)
- Spouse: Ikeda Sen
- Parent: Mori Yoshinari (father)
- Nickname: "Devil"

Military service
- Allegiance: Oda clan Toyotomi clan
- Unit: Mori clan (Genji)
- Commands: Kaneyama Castle
- Battles/wars: Sieges of Nagashima (1574); Siege of Shigisan (1577); Siege of Takatō (1582); Battle of Komaki and Nagakute (1584)

Mori Nagayoshi (森 長可; 1558 – May 18, 1584) was a samurai officer under the Oda clan following Japan's 16th-century Sengoku period, and the older brother of the famous Mori Ranmaru. His wife Ikeda Sen, was the daughter of Ikeda Tsuneoki.

Nagayoshi was known to have such a bad temper and to be particularly ruthless in battle that he came to be known as the "Devil". Nagayoshi was gifted with Kaneyama Castle after his father died in battle. While he was under the service of the Oda clan, he was directly under the service of Nobunaga’s eldest son, Oda Nobutada, who fought alongside Nagashima in 1574.

In 1577, Nagayoshi serving Nobutada to attack Matsunaga Danjo Hisahide in the Siege of Shigisan.

In 1582, he serve Nobutada to occupy Takeda Castle, he took Takatō Castle in Shinano Province and took Kazu Castle in Kai Province. He was given an award of 100,000 Koku. However, his campaign was forced to stop when his lord Oda Nobunaga and Nobutada died at Honno-ji incident. Later, Nagayoshi took Mino Castle with the help of his relatives from the Ikeda clan side of his family.

In 1584, Nagayoshi's efforts for Toyotomi Hideyoshi during the difficult Battle of Komaki and Nagakute ultimately took his life. During the battle he rode in front of his lines and waved a war fan frantically. He stood out conspicuously wearing a white jinbaori and was subsequently shot in the head by Tokugawa ashigaru firing a matchlock rifle. His younger brother Mori Tadamasa became the next clan head.

== Family ==
- Father: Mori Yoshinari (1523-1570)
- Mother: Myōkōni (d. 1596)
- Brothers:
  - Mori Yoshitaka (1552–1570)
  - Mori Ranmaru (1565-1582)
  - Mori Bōmaru (1566–1582)
  - Mori Rikimaru (1567–1582)
  - Mori Tadamasa (1570–1634)
- Wife: Ikeda Sen
