= Tokuhime (Tokugawa) =

Daughter of Tokugawa Ieyasu (1565–1615)

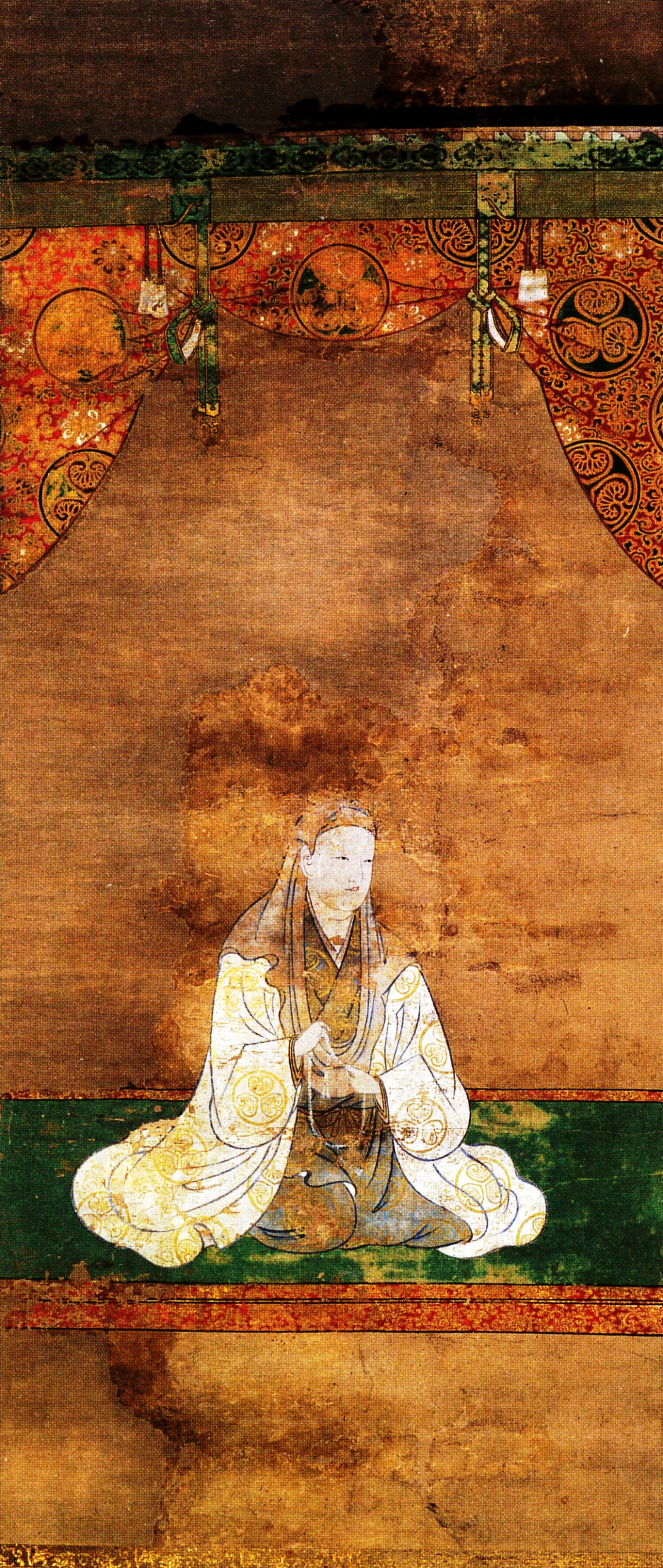
Toku-Hime after taking tonsure

Tokuhime (督姫: 1565 – March 3, 1615) (Hime means "princess", "lady") was a princess during the Sengoku and Edo periods of Japanese history. She was the second daughter of Tokugawa Ieyasu; her mother was Lady Nishigori (西郡の方), one of Ieyasu's concubines. Tokuhime was also known as Ofū, Tomiko, Harima-gozen, and Ryōshō-in.

== Life ==
In 1582, the death of Oda Nobunaga in the Incident at Honnōji left Kai and Shinano Provinces without an overlord, and the struggle between Ieyasu and Hōjō Ujinao began. However, at that time, the two had nearly equal strength, and thinking that a serious war would weaken even the winner, they sought peace. As part of the accord, Ieyasu agreed to give Toku to Ujinao to be his wife.

In 1590, Toyotomi Hideyoshi attacked the Hōjō stronghold at Odawara Castle in the Subjugation of Odawara, eradicating the Hōjō as a power. At that time, Ujinao appealed to his father-in-law Ieyasu, who prevailed upon Hideyoshi to spare Ujinao and Toku, sending them to Mount Kōya. In the following year, Ujinao died. Princess Tokuhime and Ujinao had two daughters: Hōshuin-dono. After Ujinao's death, the princess returned to her father, Ieyasu.

In 1594, Hideyoshi arranged for Toku to marry Ikeda Terumasa. They gave birth to five sons: Ikeda Teruoki (池田輝興), Ikeda Teruzumi (池田輝澄), Ikeda Masatsuna (池田政綱), Ikeda Tadatsugu (池田忠継) and Ikeda Tadakatsu (池田忠雄); and two daughters: one of them called Furihime (振姫, later known as Kōshōin 孝勝院). Tadatsugu became the lord of Okayama Castle at age five, following the death of Kobayakawa Hideaki.
