= Mori Ranmaru =

Son of Mori Yoshinari (1565-1582)

- 森 蘭丸
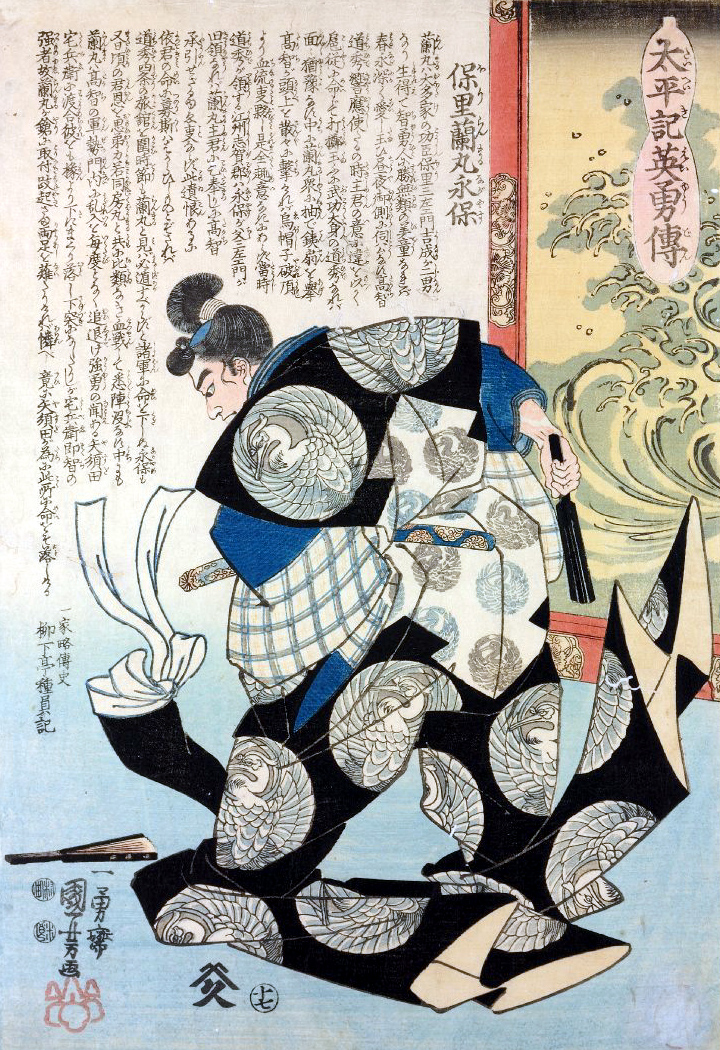
- Painting of Mori Ranmaru by Utagawa Kuniyoshi
- Born: 1565
- Died: June 21, 1582 (aged 16-17); Honnō-ji
- Relatives: Mori Yoshinari (father)
- Military career
- Allegiance: Oda clan
- Unit: Mori clan
- Conflicts: Honnō-ji Incident

Mori Ranmaru (森 蘭丸; Japanese pronunciation: [mo.ɾʲi (|) ɾam.ma.ɾɯ], 1565 – June 21, 1582), also known as Mori Naritoshi (森 成利), was a samurai retainer to the Oda clan. He was son of Mori Yoshinari, and had 5 brothers in total, from the province of Mino. He was a member of the Mori Clan, descendants of the Seiwa Genji.

== Biography ==
From an early age, Ranmaru was a retainer to Oda Nobunaga. Recognized for his talent and loyalty, he was appointed to a responsible post. At Ōmi, he was given 500 koku, and after Takeda Katsuyori's death, he was awarded the 50,000 koku at Iwamura Castle.

Ranmaru and his younger brothers defended Oda Nobunaga during the Honnō-ji Incident and allowed him to commit seppuku. Ranmaru and the rest of his retainers ignited the temple in which they had barricaded themselves. The fire killed everyone inside and burned the body of Nobunaga, therefore preventing it from being found by the rebels.

== Family ==
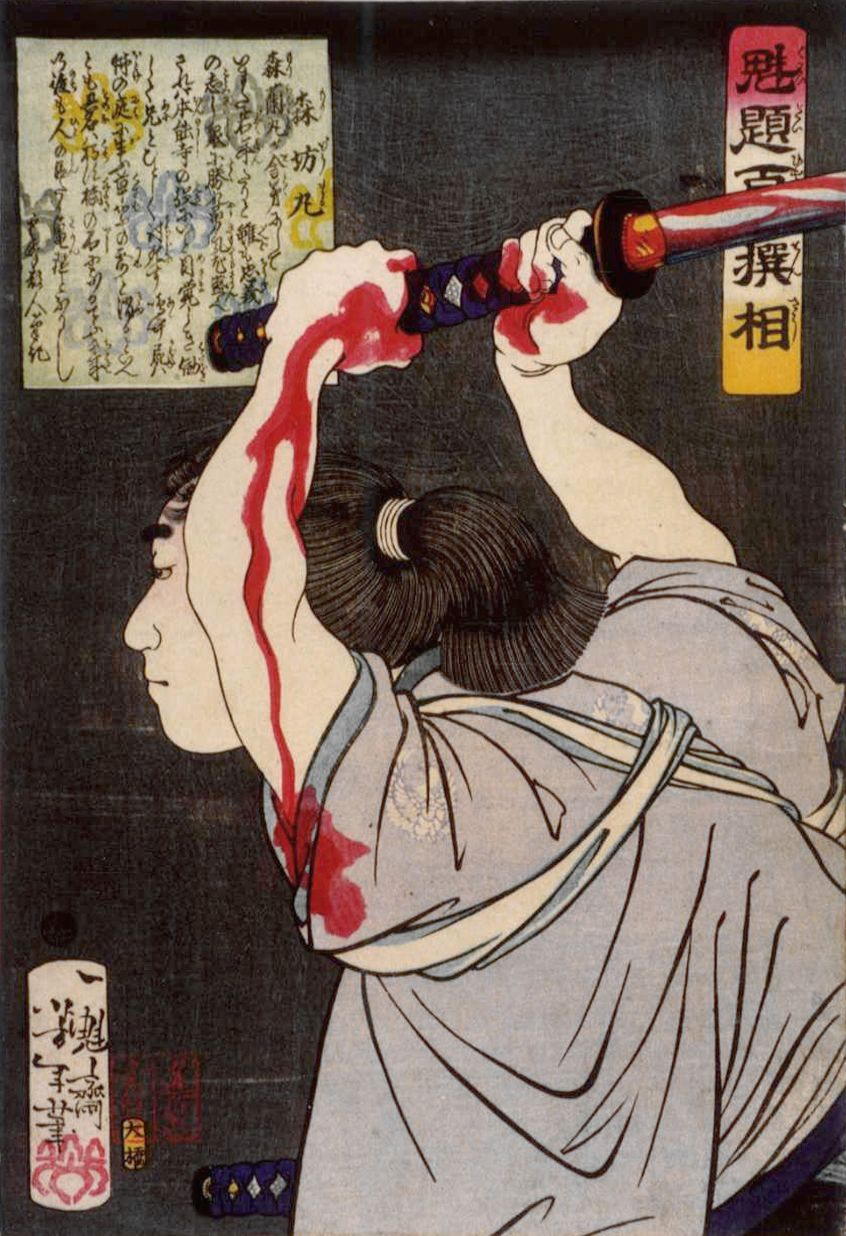
Mori Bōmaru

- Father: Mori Yoshinari (1523–1570)
- Mother: Myōkōni (d. 1596)
- Brothers:
  - Mori Yoshitaka (1552–1570)
  - Mori Nagayoshi (1558–1584)
  - Mori Bōmaru (1566–1582)
  - Mori Rikimaru (1567–1582)
  - Mori Tadamasa (1570–1634)

== In popular culture ==
Ranmaru has often been the subject of works of art since the Edo period, and continues to be seen in various forms of modern fictional media today. Due to admiration for his loyalty, Ranmaru has been depicted as a loyal page of Nobunaga in various works of classical Japanese art. Such works include ukiyo-e prints by artists such as Kuniyoshi, Yoshitoshi, and Toshihide. He has also been a character in kabuki plays such as Tsuruya Namboku IV's Toki-ha Ima Kikyô no Hataage. In nanshoku literature of the Edo period, it was commonly depicted that Oda and Mori had a sexual relationship that was commonly found in those times.

In most modern media his portrayal as a loyal servant to Nobunaga is generally continued. Such portrayals are in historical drama films and television programs such as Akira Kurosawa's Kagemusha and various Taiga dramas, in novels such as Eiji Yoshikawa's Taiko, in manga such as Hyouge Mono and A Chef of Nobunaga, and in video games such as Samurai Warriors, Sengoku Basara, Onimusha 3: Demon Siege and Pokémon Conquest. He is occasionally portrayed as a woman, for instance in the stage play and anime series Nobunaga the Fool, the tokusatsu series Kamen Rider Gaim, and the mobile game Fate Grand Order. Ranmaru has also been the subject of modern music, such as KAT-TUN's 1582 which is written from the perspective of Mori Ranmaru at Honnouji.

There is a character in The Wallflower known as Ranmaru Mori, as well as a character in Pokémon Conquest going by the name of Ranmaru, with his partner Pokémon being Lucario, who serves under Nobunaga's command. There is also a boss in Maple Story sharing the same name. Ranmaru also appears as a minor character in the anime Mirage of Blaze based on the novel series of the name.

Mori Ranmaru also appears as a character in the 2025 entry of the long-running Assassin's Creed video game series, Assassin's Creed: Shadows voiced by Japanese-Canadian voice actor, Liam Kiyoshi Baxter.

== See also ==
Media related to Mori Ranmaru at Wikimedia Commons
