= Battle of Komaki and Nagakute =

Series of 1584 battles in Japan

- Part of the Sengoku period
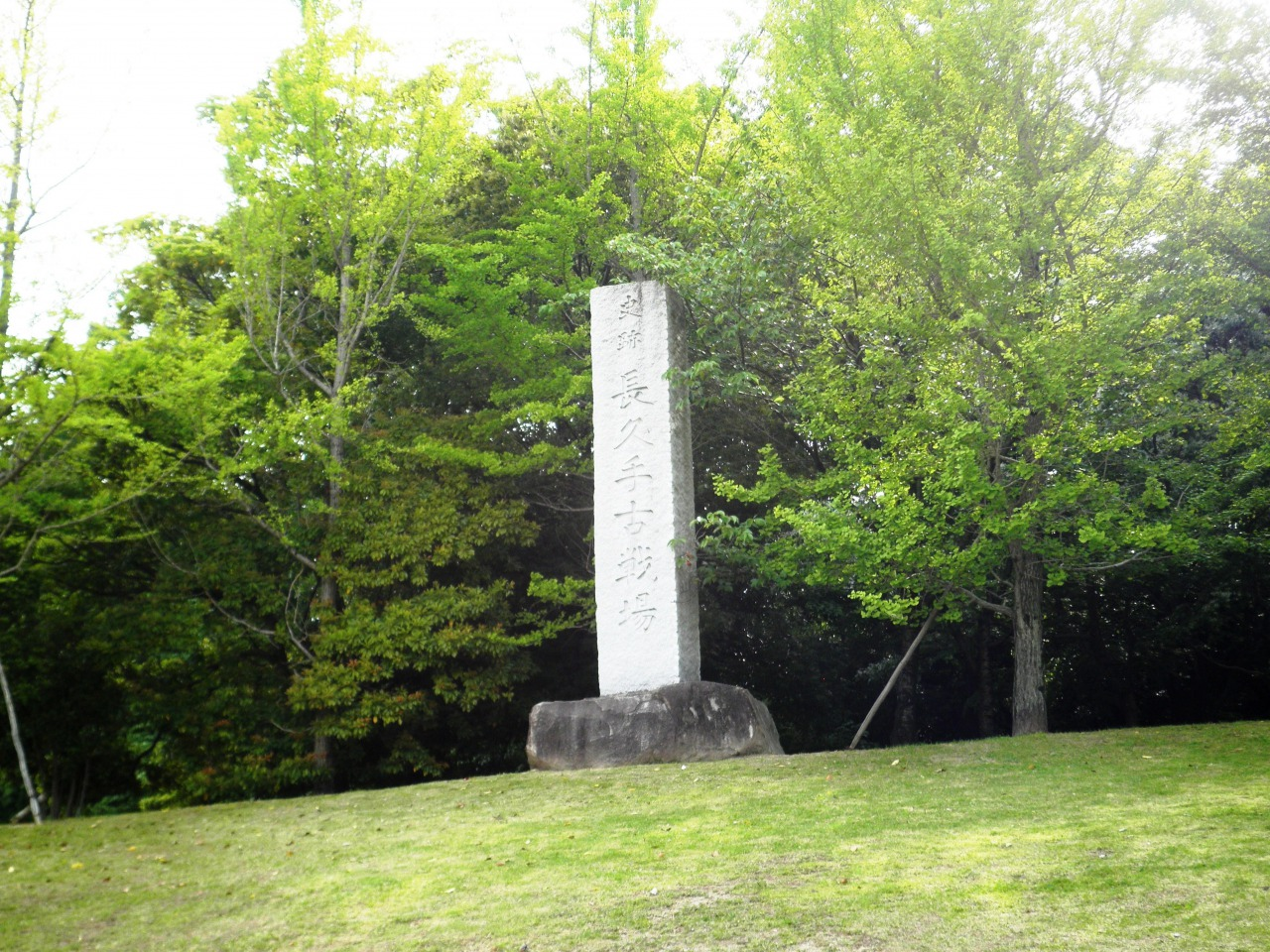
- Nagakute Historic Battlefield
Date	March–November 1584
Location	Owari Province, Japan: Mount Komaki; Ama District; Nagakute; 35°11′10″N 137°03′19″E
Result	inconclusive; Peace negotiations between Hideyoshi and Ieyasu.

Belligerents
Forces of Hashiba Hideyoshi	Forces of Tokugawa Ieyasu and Oda Nobukatsu

Commanders and leaders
Hashiba Hideyoshi; Hashiba Hidekatsu; Hashiba Hidenaga; Hashiba Hidetsugu; Ikeda Tsuneoki †; Ikeda Motosuke †; Ikeda Terumasa; Mori Nagayoshi †; Maeda Toshiie; Maeda Toshimasu; Maeda Toshinaga; Maeda Tanetoshi (executed); Takigawa Kazumasu; Kuroda Kanbei; Hori Hidemasa; Inaba Ittetsu; Yamauchi Kazutoyo; Kuki Yoshitaka; Gamō Ujisato; Kanamori Nagachika; Kato Kiyomasa; Katō Yoshiaki; Fukushima Masanori; Hosokawa Tadaoki; Ishida Mitsunari; Tsutsui Junkei; Tsutsui Sadatsugu; Takenaka Shigekado; Asano Nagamasa; Tōdō Takatora; Ikoma Chikamasa; Niwa Nagashige; Ogawa Suketada; Kani Saizō; Tanaka Yoshimasa; Kinoshita Sukehisa †	Tokugawa Ieyasu; Oda Nobukatsu; Oda Nagamasu; Sassa Narimasa; Sakai Tadatsugu; Ishikawa Kazumasa; Sakakibara Yasumasa; Honda Tadakatsu; Honda Masanobu; Honda Shigetsugu; Ii Naomasa; Okudaira Nobumasa; Matsudaira Ietada; Torii Mototada; Niwa Ujishige †; Ōkubo Tadayo; Ōkubo Tadasuke; Ōkubo Tadataka; Ōkubo Tadachika; Mizuno Tadashige; Mizuno Katsushige; Kōriki Kiyonaga; Amano Yasukage; Hattori Hanzō; Watanabe Moritsuna; Maeda Tanetoshi (defected to the Toyotomi)

Strength
100,000	30,000

Casualties and losses
Battle of Haguro: 300-1,000; Battle of Nagakute: +2,500 - 10,000	+590
- Location within Aichi Prefecture Battle of Komaki and Nagakute (Japan)

The Battle of Komaki and Nagakute (小牧・長久手の戦い, Komaki-Nagakute no Tatakai), also known as the Komaki Campaign (小牧の役 Komaki no Eki), was a series of battles in 1584 between the forces of Hashiba Hideyoshi (who would become Toyotomi Hideyoshi in 1586) and the forces of Oda Nobukatsu and Tokugawa Ieyasu.

The conflict ended after Oda Nobukatsu made peace with Hideyoshi in November 1584. With Nobukatsu having made peace with Hideyoshi, Ieyasu no longer had a clear justification for continuing the war.

== Background ==
In 1583, at the Battle of Shizugatake, Hideyoshi supported Nobukatsu, the second son of Oda Nobunaga, and defeated Shibata Katsuie, who supported Nobunaga's third son, Nobutaka. After winning the battle, Hideyoshi invited Nobukatsu and other generals to his residence at Osaka Castle, which he had just completed that same year. The meaning of such an invitation was for all the men to pay homage to Hideyoshi, which would reverse the roles between Hideyoshi and Nobukatsu. Therefore, Nobukatsu broke his bonds to Hideyoshi and did not go to Osaka Castle. Hideyoshi offered reconciliation to three of Nobukatsu's chief retainers (Tsugawa Yoshifuyu, Okada Shigetaka and Azai Nagatoki), which led to rumors that they were all in support of Hideyoshi. This in turn led Nobukatsu to become suspicious of the three men, whom he ordered executed on the sixth day of the third month of Tenshō 12 (or 17 March 1584 on the Gregorian calendar) These actions gave Hideyoshi the justification for attacking Nobukatsu and, as a result, Nobukatsu asked Tokugawa Ieyasu for auxiliary forces. The next day, when Ieyasu sent his forces out to battle, it became a battle between Hideyoshi and Ieyasu.

Tokugawa troops took the traditional Oda stronghold of Owari. Hideyoshi responded by sending an army into Owari. Ieyasu decided to confront Hideyoshi's forces in Komaki because his general, Sakakibara Yasumasa, suggested the area was favorable for the Tokugawa force to fight incoming enemies from the west.

On March 7, Nobukatsu sent Nobuzumi Oda to Tosa to send a letter to Kōsokabe Chikayasu, informing Chosokabe Motochika of the assassination of his vassals and his breaking off relations with Hideyoshi, and asking for military aid from the Chosokabe clan. The plan was to have Sassa Narimasa in the Hokuriku region attack Toshiie Maeda and Nagahide Niwa, while the Chosokabe would attack Osaka from Awaji while keeping the Mōri clan in check, and cooperate with the Saika Ikki, the Negoro-shū warrior monks, and the Kōsa Hongan-ji Forces to fight the Toyotomi forces simultaneously. In response to Nobukatsu's orders, Ieyasu had already departed from Hamamatsu Castle on the 7th, advanced through Okazaki, Yahagi, Ano, and Narumi, and on the 12th set up camp at Yamazaki.

Hideyoshi feared that the Mōri clan would join the battle, and he kept Ukita Hideie and the Inaba clan forces on guard to anticipate any Mōri movement throughout the campaign against Nobukatsu and Ieyasu.

== Early battles ==
During this conflict, Honda Tadakatsu entered negotiation with the Akai clan, a samurai clan from Tanba Province, which led by Ashida Tokinao, younger brother of Akai Naomasa, as Tokinao aspired for the revival of the Akai clan by contributing with Tokugawa clan. (Note: A letter from Honda Tadakatsu dated May 16 addressed to Ashida Yahyoe-no-jo (Akai Tokinao) reads, "The son of Akuu-u (Akai Naomasa) has been taken into custody.") Tokinao then raised an army in Tanba to aid Ieyasu.

On the night of March 8, Hideyoshi sent orders to his subordinates in various regions to prepare for battle as he heard Nobukatsu killed three of his vassals. He also dispatched Tomita Tomonobu to request that Nobukatsu come and explain the situation, but Nobukatsu refused, so on the 15th he gave the order to march to Owari Province. Meanwhile, Nobukatsu gave Matsugashima Castle to Takigawa Katsutoshi, but when Katsuroshi vassals went to claim it, they were refused entry by Tsugawa's vassals, so Katsutoshi and Nagamasa Kozukuri forces surrounded and captured the castle. From there on, Katsutoshi, along with Hioki Daizennosuke, claimed Matsugashima Castle for Nobukatsu. It is also said that Katsuyoshi had been persuaded by Hideyoshi to side with him, but Katsuyoshi refused.

On March 9, Sakuma Nobuhide (Masakatsu) and Yamaguchi Shigemasa, the lords of Kanie Castle, were dispatched to Ise to attack Ise Kameyama Castle, which was defended by Seki Morinobu and his son Kazumasa who sided wirh Toyotomi faction. However, as they were unable to take it easily, they retreated to Mine Castle, which was under repair. Nakagawa Taketada (Sadanari) and Seki Jingobei headed to Ise as reinforcements.

On March 10, Hideyoshi invited Mizuno Tadashige, Niwa Ujitsugu, and Takagi Sadatomo, who were on Oda Nobukatsu's faction, to join him as vassals, but they did not accept. In the same day, Nobukatsu requested assistance from Ikeda Tsuneoki of Ōgaki Castle in Mino and Mori Nagayoshi of Kaneyama Castle. but Hideyoshi also sent his own vassal, Bitō Tomonobu, to persuade the two. Discord arose within the Ikeda family, but Iki Tadatsugu urged Hideyoshi to help. Hideyoshi then sent Tsuda Hayatosa (Nobuyuki) to further persuade them, promising them the three provinces of Mino, Owari, and Mikawa as a reward. In the end, the Ikeda and Mori clan declined Nobukatsu's request and joined Hideyoshi. On the other place, Oda Nobukage, Hori Hidemasa, Gamō Ujisato, Hasegawa Hidekazu, Hineno Hironari, and Takigawa Kazumasu attacked Mine Castle with over 10,000 soldiers. Because the castle's defenses were insufficient, Sakuma Nobuhide decided to attack, but was ambushed by Takigawa Kazumasu and defeated, with Seki Jingobei killed in battle. Nobuhide abandoned the castle and retreated.

In March 13, Tasashige and his son Mizuno Katsunari were ordered to rescue Kobe Castle in Ise. Tadashige attacked the position of Okada Yoshitada, the younger brother of Okada Shigetaka (who was executed by Nobukatsu), forcing him to surrender and capturing it. On the other place, Inuyama Castle, which had been left thinly defended due to a reinforcement mission to Ise, was suddenly attacked and occupied by Ikeda Tsuneoki son, Motosuke. Nakagawa Seizonosuke, who was in charge of the castle, was defeated and killed. In March 14, Nakagawa Yutada was hurriedly returning to Inuyama when he was assassinated by Ikejiri Heizaemon, who had targeted him out of personal vengeance. Upon learning of the fall of Inuyama Castle, Sakai Tadatsugu and Mizuno Tadashige joined the defense of Kuwana Castle to anticipate further attack from the Toyotomi faction In Mino.

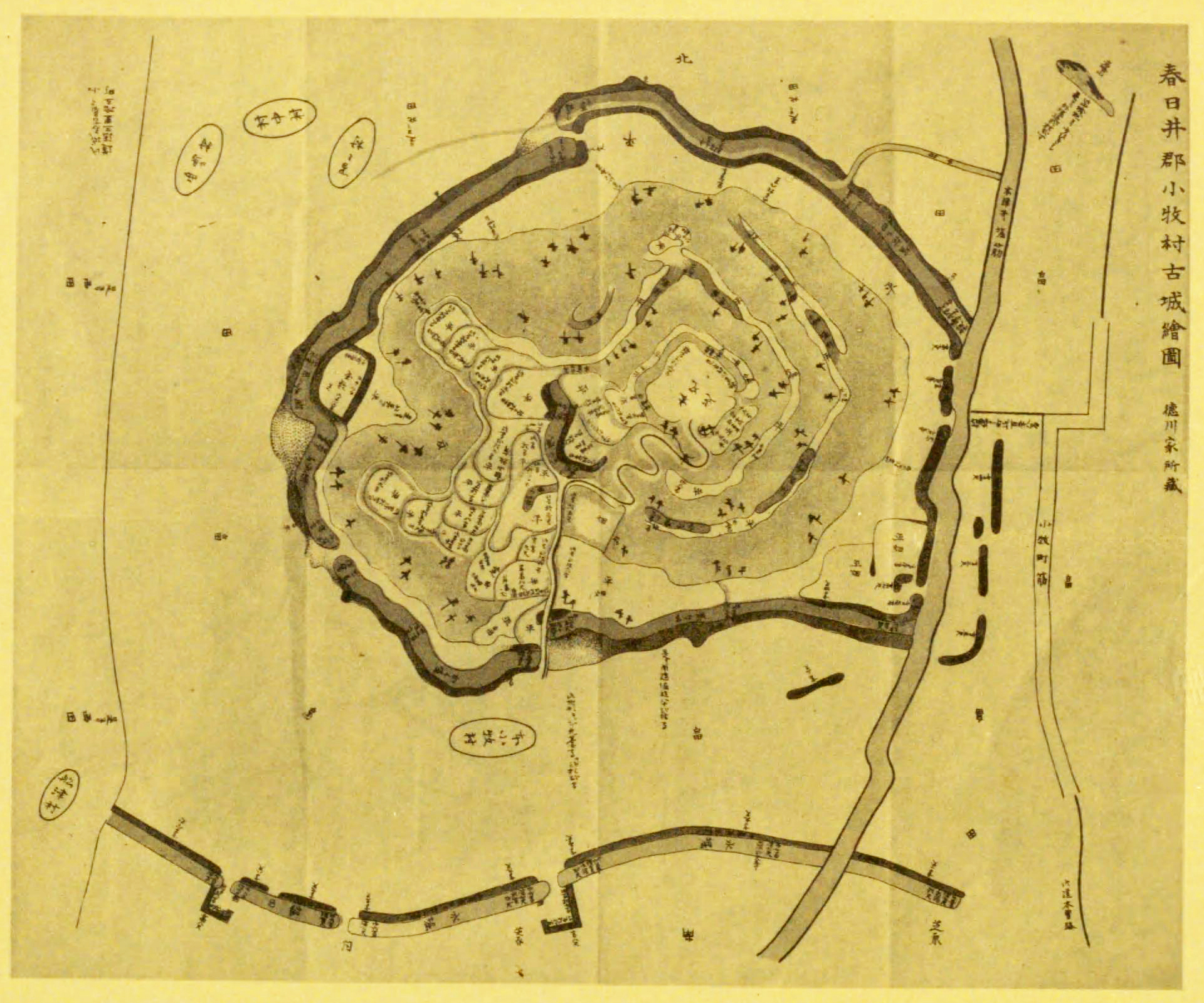
Old map of Komaki Castle

Meanwhile, in the same day, Nobukatsu met with Ieyasu at Kiyosu Castle to hold a strategy meeting, and Sakakibara Yasumasa stepped forward and proposed building a fort at Komakiyama, on the border between the Oda and Tokugawa clan as the headquarters. The remains of a castle from Nobunaga's time were on Komakiyama, which later nearly completed in March 22. After that Nobukatsu returned to Nagashima Castle to defend Ise.

=== Battle of Haguro ===
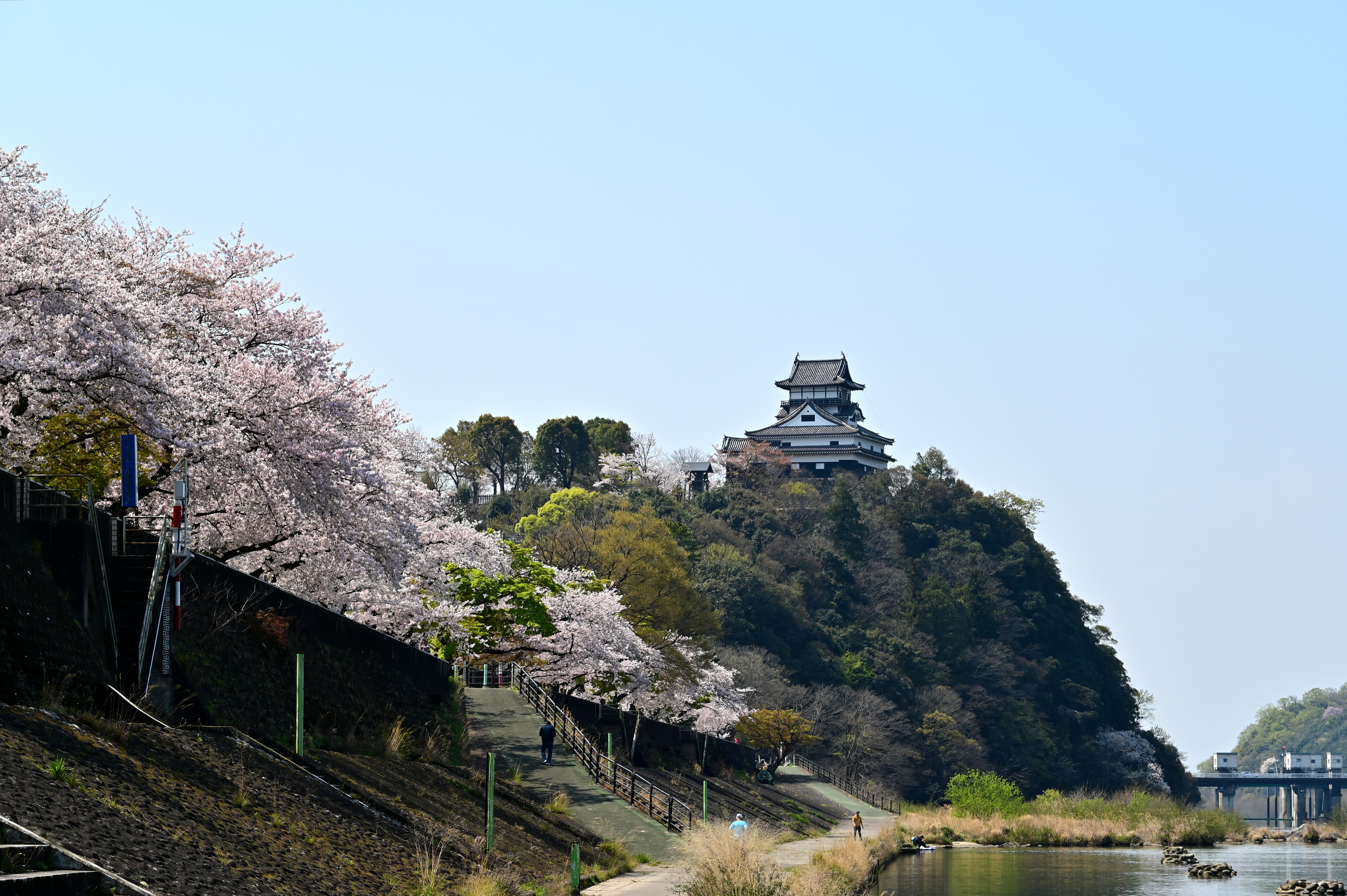
Inuyama Castle on a cliff

On March 16, Mori Nagayoshi, who was envious of his father-in-law, Tsuneoki's military achievements, advanced beyond Inuyama Castle and set up camp at Hachimanbayashi in Haguro with his military inspector Bitou Tomonobu, hoping to achieve some success of his own. On March 21, Hideyoshi left Osaka with a large army and entered Inuyama Castle on the 27th. On the 28th, Ieyasu also entered Komakiyama, leaving Kiyosu Castle in the hands of Naito Nobunari and Miyake Yasusada, and the next day, Nobukatsu joined the camp at Komakiyama. At the same time, Mori Nagayoshi, began his attempt for the Kiyosu Castle. Sakai Tadatsugu, who was already scouting the Nagayoshi forces' movement for certain time, discovered their position and immediately received permission from Ieyasu to attack. Sakai had Amano Yukimitsu guide him, and at dawn the next day, he launched a surprise attack with Matsudaira Ietada, Matsudaira Ienobu, Okudaira Nobumasa, and Honda Yasushige. Okudaira crossed the Gojo River and began his charge, but Mori and Bitou fought bravely and pushed them back. However, as they pursued the retreating enemies too far, they were ambushed from behind by Tadatsugu's detachment and his men, resulting in confusion among Nagayoshi's soldiers. This caused Mori Nagayoshi to retreat, having suffered 300 casualties. One of Nagayoshi's officer, Noro Munenaga, was killed by Matsudaira Sadaharu. However, they ultimately failed to entrap Nagayoshi as he managed to break through the encirclement and retreat. Following this, Tadatsugu returned to Komaki where he, Honda Tadakatsu, and Ishikawa Kazumasa stationed their troops.

By March 18, vassals Nishio Yoshitsugu and Abe Masakatsu jointly sent a reply to Toyama Sadonokami, reporting that they had defeated Mori Nagayoshi in the Battle of Haguro on March 17, killing over 1,000 Nagayoshi's soldiers. In response to this news Kushihara Toyama, Sado no Kami, and Hanzaemon-no-jo switched sides to Nobukatsu and Ieyasu, facing off against Mori Nagayoshi, who was on Hideyoshi's side. Learning of Nagayoshi's defeat at the Battle of Haguro, they launched an attack on Akechi Castle. Ieyasu dispatched Toyama Toshikage. On April 8, they also attacked Iwamura Castle.

=== Stand off at Mount Komaki ===
After the battle of Haguro, Ieyasu occupied Komakiyama Castle on March 18 and constructed forts and earthworks around it to prepare for the Hashiba army. Hideyoshi left Osaka Castle with 30,000 soldiers on March 21, advanced to Gifu on around March 21 or 27. On April 4, Hideyoshi also built a fort on Mount. Iwasaki and established his headquarters at Rakuden Castle. Both sides built numerous forts.

On April 8, Tadashige led the vanguard of the Oda-Tokugawa allied forces, along with Okanaga Nagamori, Osuka Yasutaka, Sakakibara Yasumasa, Honda Hirotaka, and Niwa Ujitsugu. At a military council held at Obata Castle, Tadashige proposed a strategy to avoid the enemy's main force and rather attacking the Toyotomi army's rear. Sakakibara and other generals agreed and commence Tadashige's plan. The next morning, they attacked Miyoshi Hidetsugu's main camp and routed him. In this engagement, Tadashige's family member, Mizuno Buncho, reportedly manage to Kill enemy general Kinoshita Toshimasa. Hirano Nagayasu also reportedly fought on this battle under Hidetsugu.

On Tensho 12, 13th day of the third month (23 April 1584), Ieyasu arrived at Kiyosu Castle. On that same day, warriors of the Oda clan's vassals who were led by Ikeda Tsuneoki switched to the side of Hideyoshi and took over Inuyama Castle, which had originally been built by Oda Nobunaga.

Meanwhile, Takigawa Katsutoshi received reinforcements from Tokugawa general Hattori Hanzō, as he held out against Hashiba Hidenaga's siege. However, within a month, he was cornered to the Ninomaru (second bailey of the castle), and after a hard fight, he surrendered the castle on the condition that the lives of his soldiers be spared. Through his wife, Keihō-ni, Katsutoshi negotiated with the besieging forces to be allowed to safely leave the castle.

== Hidetsugu's expedition ==
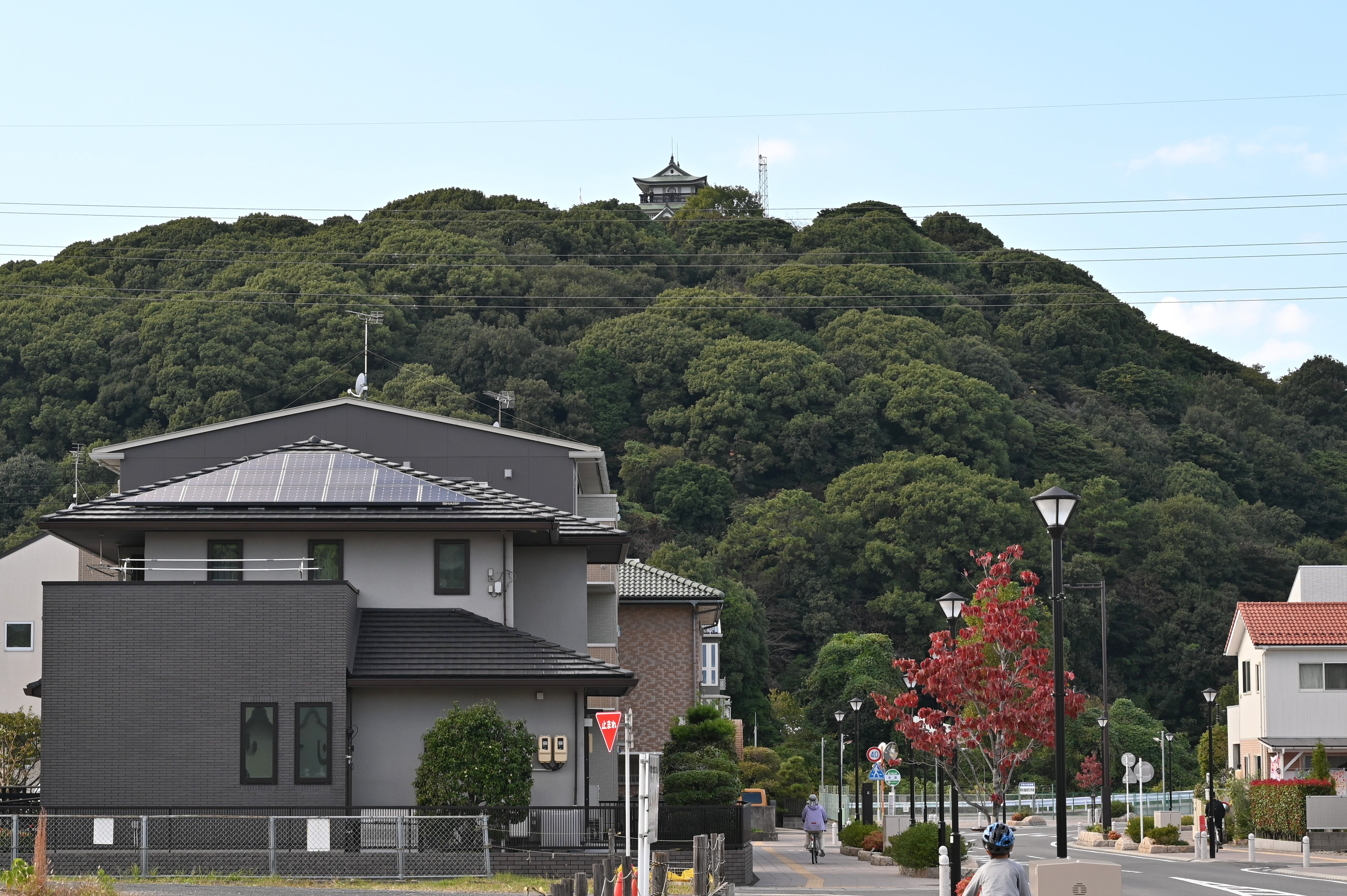
Mt. Komaki & Komaki Castle (not Komakiyama Castle)

Hideyoshi and his troops left his fortifications at Osaka Castle on the 21st day (1 May), while Hirano Nagayasu fought at the Battle of Futaebori castle before retreating.

On May 4, Hideyoshi inspected the area and ordered preparations for a flood siege of Takegahana Castle. He ordered the first attack on Kaganoi Castle in Mino, where Kagai Shigemune and his son Shigemochi were holed up . The Hashiba forces of Nagaoka and Gamou attacked fiercely, and the defenders requested peace, but their demands were not accepted. So, in the early hours of the 6th, they opened the castle gates and charged out. Later, Hideyoshi arrived at Inuyama Castle on the 27th day (7 May).

On May 9, Oku Castle which was defended by Oda Nobuteru, who was on Nobukatsu's side, surrendered. On the May 10, the levee was completed, and Takegahana Castle was completely surrounded and submerged. On May 11, there was an incident where Oda Nobukatsu's vassal, Sakuma Michinori, suddenly attacked Ichijo-cho in Kyoto and attempted a rebellion. While the Shoshidai (deputy governor), Maeda Gen'i , was away to Owari Province. Onogi Shigetsugu, who was stationed in Yodo in Yamashiro, immediately led 300 soldiers and quickly put down the rebellion. Michinori fled. Although the rebellion was unsuccessful, it makes Hideyoshi furious and led to a major confusion involving the Emperor, the Imperial Court, and the Hongan-ji Temple.

Ieyasu, between entering Komaki Castle and arriving in Gakuden, stayed away from battle, except for a few smaller skirmishes here and there. Hideyoshi was lulled into complacency by this situation, aided by Tsuneoki, who said to him, "Ieyasu is now in Komakiyama. He is away from his main base in Okazaki and if we were to move our arms against him, we will certainly win.". Furthermore, from March to October 1581, the Kushihara-Toyama and the Akechi-Toyama clan rebellion against Mori Nagayoshi getting emboldened by his defeat at Haguro, many castles which belonged to Nagayoshi in that area were in danger. This frustrated Nagayoshi so much that it prompts him to also push the plan to invade Mikawa immediately.

The ambitious Hideyoshi decided to set out for Mikawa, along with the support of Mori Nagayoshi (who had regained his reputation at the Battle of Haguro), Ikeda Tsuneoki (who was embarrassed by his daughter's marriage), Hori Hidemasa and the young Hidetsugu (17 years old at the time). The main formations of each unit are as follows:

- First Corps - Tsuneoki Ikeda - 5,000 soldiers
- 2nd Corps - Nagayoshi Mori - 3,000 soldiers
- Third Corps - Hidemasa Hori - 3,000 soldiers
- Fourth Corps - Hidetsugu Hashiba - 9,000 soldiers.

=== Battle of Iwasaki Castle ===
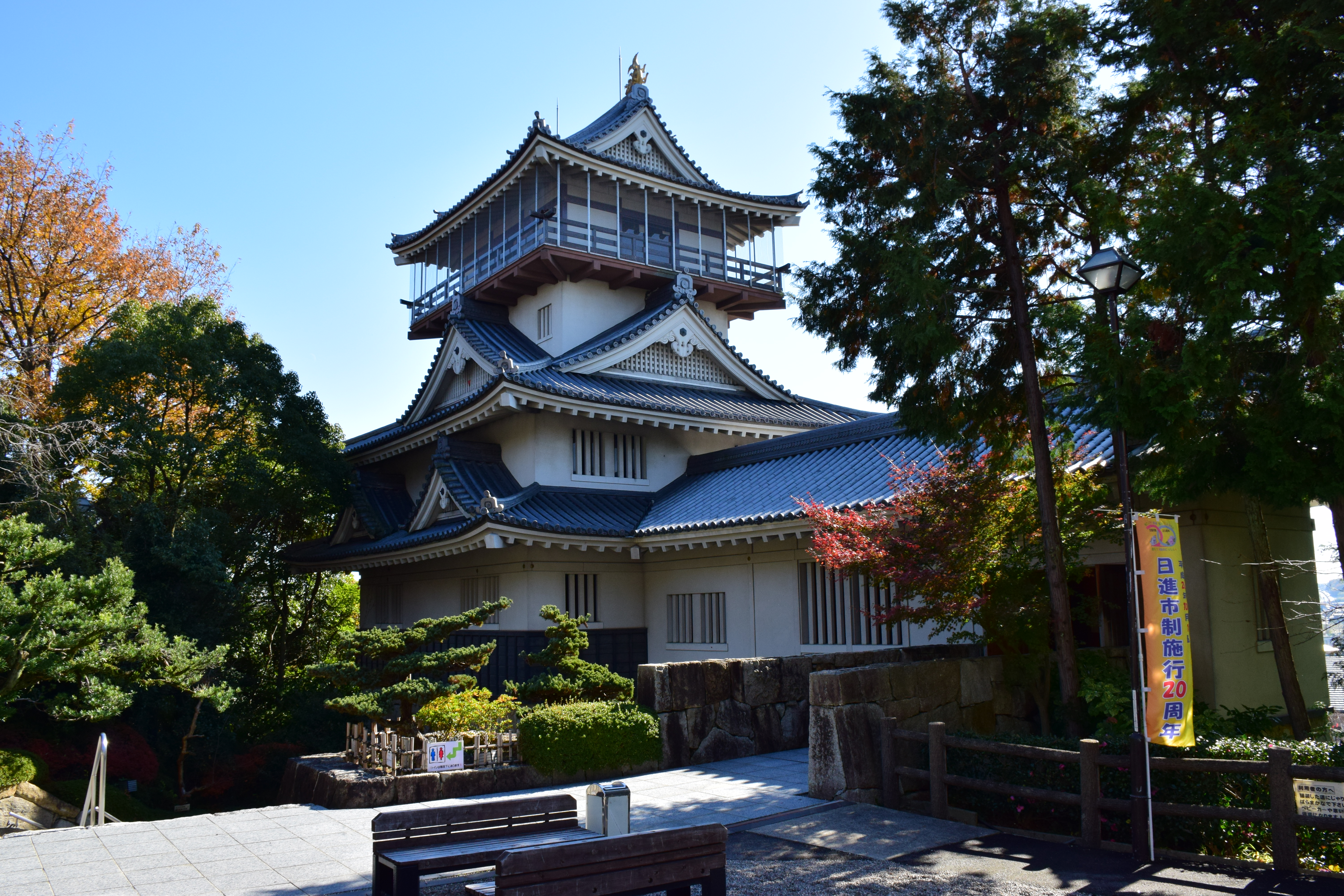
Iwasaki Castle

The Battle of Iwasaki was fought between the forces of Ikeda Tsuneoki and the Iwasaki castle garrison led by Niwa Ujitsugu. Though it was just part of the overall Battle of Komaki and Nagakute, it played an important role in the outcome.

Ikeda Tsuneoki led the attack on Iwasaki Castle (modern-day Nisshin) and was promptly shot off from his horse. Embarrassed by his fall, Tsuneoki forgot about the hit-and-run tactics and started a full assault on the castle. Though the defenders fought well, the castle fell. Niwa Ujitsugu, suffered numerous casualties including 300 killed, Ujitsugu's brother Niwa Ujishige being among the dead.

=== Battle of Hakusan Forest ===
While the siege of Iwasaki Castle was underway, Hidetsugu's forces were resting in Hakusan Forest (Moriyama Ward, Nagoya City, Owariasahi City), Ieyasu learned of Hidetsugu's encampment at Shinogi (modern-day Kasugai). At around 4:35 on the 9th, they were attacked from the rear by the forces of Mizuno Tadashige, Niwa Ujitsugu, and Ōsuga Yasutaka, and from the flank by the forces of Sakakibara Yasumasa. This surprise attack wiped out Hidetsugu's forces. Hidetsugu lost his own horse and escaped on the horses of his companions. Many members of the Kinoshita clan, including Kinoshita Sukehisa (the father of Hideyoshi's wife, Nene) and his younger brother Kinoshita Toshimasa, who were assigned as inspectors, were killed in battle while trying to secure Hidetsugu's retreat. Hidetsugu himself was knocked from his horse, but was able to get another horse and escape.

However, Yasumasa and Yasutaka's forces were met by reinforcement forces led by Hori Hidemasa, prompting the battle of Hinokigane.

=== Battle of Hinokigane ===
Following the battle of Hakusanmori, the Tokugawa fortified Mount Komaki, creating a stalemate there. Thus, Ikeda Tsuneoki, one of Toyotomi Hideyoshi's chief commanders, decided to begin raids through neighboring Mikawa Province with an army numbering 20,000. Ieyasu expected this and led Tokugawa troops to challenge Hideyoshi's forces. Mizuno Tadashige led Tokugawa's rear-guard against Ikeda's force and the noise of the battle alerted Hori Hidemasa, the head of one of Hideyoshi's divisions. Hori Hidemasa led his men to the defense of his comrades, taking up position in the village of Nagakute. He held off the initial Tokugawa attacks. Due to this defeat, Sakakibara Yasumasa fled to Iwasaku, while Osuka Yasutaka fled toward Inokoishi.

However, Hidemasa was forced to withdraw as the main body of the Tokugawa army arrived, numbering some 9,000 warriors.

=== Battle of Nagakute ===
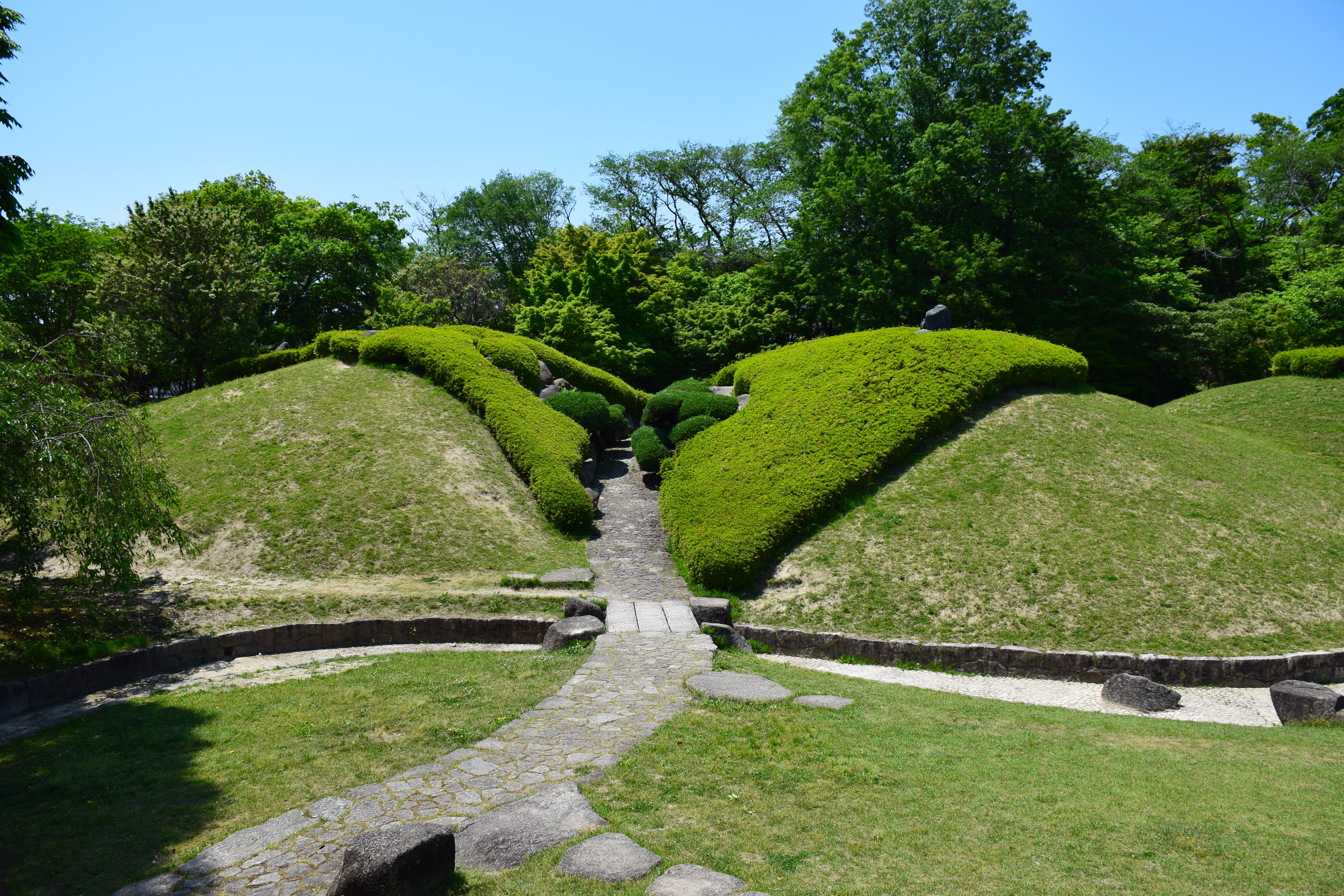
Nagakute historic battleground park

Mori Nagayoshi, another of Hideyoshi's commanders, waited until Ieyasu moved in to support Ii Naomasa, so that he could flank them. At first, Naomasa's troops broke and retreating under the enemy assault, until Ieyasu furiously sent Naomasa's lieutenant, Kimata Morikatsu, to assist Naomasa in restoring order. Historian Hiroyuki Kikuchi noted that during this battle, Naomasa acted recklessly by personally going to fight on the frontline, engaging in melee and grappling an enemy soldier, thereby exposing himself in dangerous position. This prompted his own subordinate, Andō Naotsugu, to chastise Naomasa for his recklessness and not behaving like a military commander who should have focused on giving commands to his soldiers from the rear. This also gave much trouble for Naomasa's other field officer, Kimata Morikatsu, in coordinating their troops. The battle lasted over two hours, as Naomasa units repeatedly foiled attempted charges towards his position by Tsuneoki and Mori Nagayoshi troops with musket rifle barrages. The battle entered its final phase as Tokugawa forces charged forward, rather than swinging around, Ii Naomasa commanded around three thousand musketeers during this battle, until Nagayoshi was shot and killed in action in the middle of heat of the battle against Naomasa's forces. Nagayoshi was said to have been shot between his eyes, resulting in instant death, by Sugiyama Magoroku (a musketeer under Mizuno Tarosakukiyohisa, vassal of Mizuno Katsunari). Tsuneoki was killed by Nagai Naokatsu's spear and died in battle. (Note: It was said that Naotsugu Ando who killed both Nagayoshi and Ikeda Tsuneoki. However, it is recorded Ando let others to claim the head of Tsuneoki.) Additionally, Tsuneoki's son Ikeda Motosuke was also slain in this battle. The armies of Nagayoshi and Tsuneoki were annihilated and it ended in victory for the Tokugawa force.

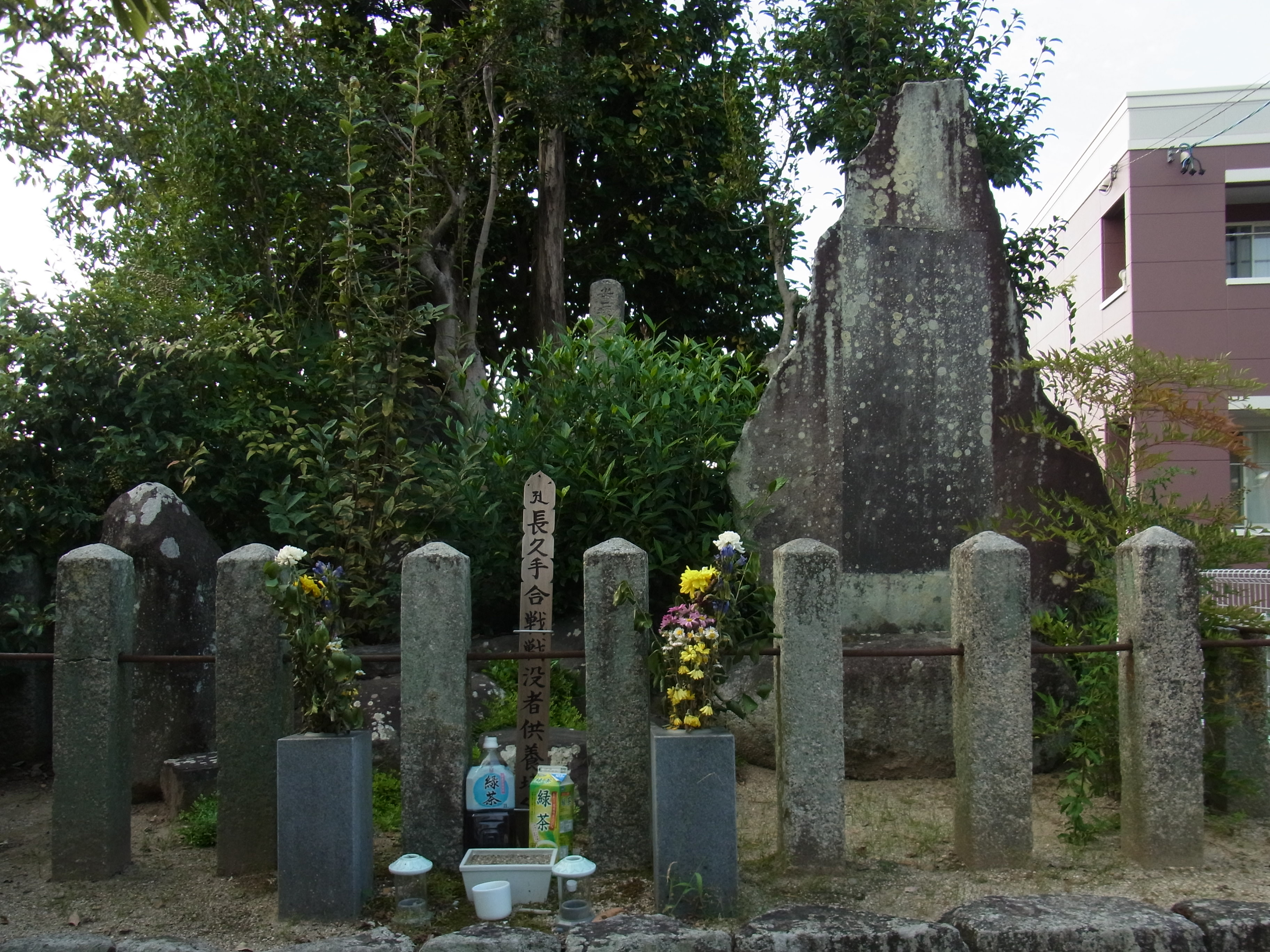
A grave where the monks of Anshoji Temple buried those killed in the Battle of Nagakute.

After the battle was concluded, a letter from Oda Nobukatsu (the "Yoshimura Documents") and supporting account was also found in a letter from Luis Frois, who states that the majority of the approximately 10,000 soldiers killed in this battle were from Hidetsugu's army, (Note: Other sources stated in just over 2,500 casualties) while the Oda-Tokugawa army suffered over 590 casualties This news made Hideyoshi angry.

Meanwhile, Ieyasu decided to withdraw, unwilling to risk further casualties as Hideyoshi's main army approached, and returned to Komaki.

When news of the loss at the Battle of Hakusanmori arrived in the afternoon, the 20,000 troops of Hideyoshi rushed to Ryūsen-ji, near the battle site. Later that evening, when he heard that Ieyasu was staying at Obata Castle, he decided to assault it the next morning; however, during that time, Ieyasu had left Obata Castle, went to Komakiyama Castle and finally returned to Kiyosu Castle. Hideyoshi heard the news of Tsuneoki dead and Ieyasu's departure shortly thereafter, and on the 10th day of the fourth month (19 May), he left Gakuden; he arrived back to Osaka castle on the 1st day of the fifth month (9 June).

With Mori Nagayoshi killed in Nagakute on April 9, Akechi Castle fell on April 17. The Kushihara Toyama, Akechi Toyama, and Naegi Toyama clans continued fighting in various locations, and it is likely that Toyama Tomomasa also recaptured Naegi Castle. Kiso Yoshimasa from Shinano Province, under attack from the Tokugawa, requested reinforcements from Hideyoshi. Hideyoshi instructed Mori Tadamasa to send a small number of reinforcements to Kiso, but this was aborted later. addition, Okudaira Nobumasa, Suzuki Shigetsugu and others marching out to reinforce Toyama Castle.

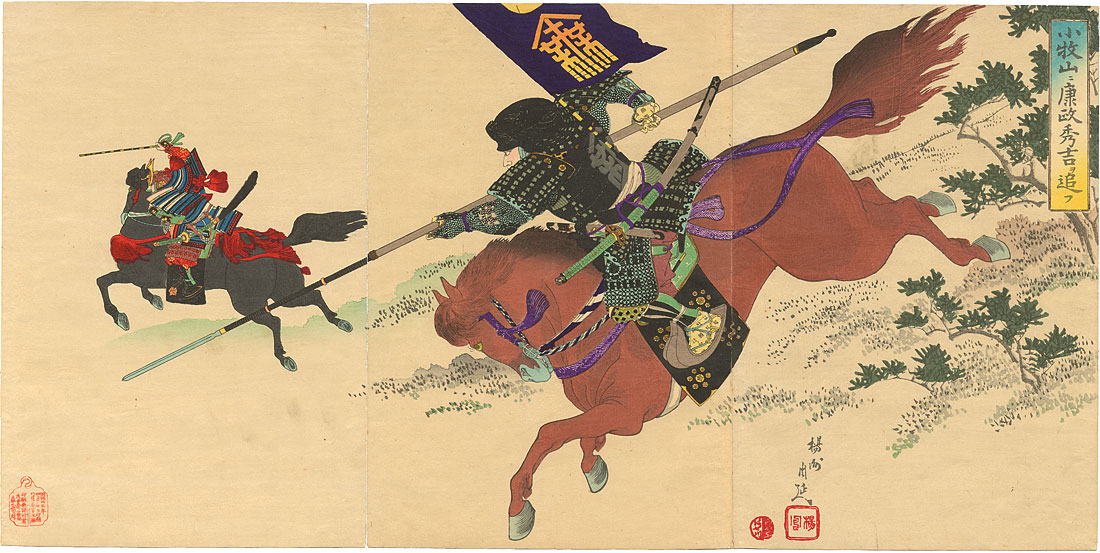
Edo period portrayal of Sakakibara Yasumasa chasing Toyotomi Hideyoshi at Mount Komaki

Yasumasa circulated derogatory manifesto proclamations which condemned Hideyoshi's conduct, which Yasumasa viewed as betrayal towards the will of Oda Nobunaga and also insultes Hideyoshi's origin from a humble peasant. Hideyoshi become furious after hearing this proclamation and issued an order that he would reward of 100,000 Kan (Japanese gold ingot) to anyone who could bring him the head of Yasumasa. (Note: This story of Yasumasa insulting Hideyoshi was first appeared in a work of Arai Hakuseki. Historian Watanabe Daimon stated that it is difficult to confirm the truth of this story.)

== Further battles before the truce ==
On June 7, Fuwa Hirotsuna, having run out of options, requested peace through Hideyoshi's vassal Ichiyanagi Naosue. On June 10, he surrendered the castle and retreated to Kiyosu Castle. On June 12, Ieyasu left Mount Komaki in the care of Sakai Tadatsugu and retreated to Kiyosu Castle. On June 13, Hideyoshi was hoping for reinforcements from the enemy, but seeing that Ieyasu and Nobukatsu would not respond to any provocations, he retreated to Ogaki Castle, and returned to Omi on the 21st and to Osaka on June 27.

=== Siege of Kanie Castle ===
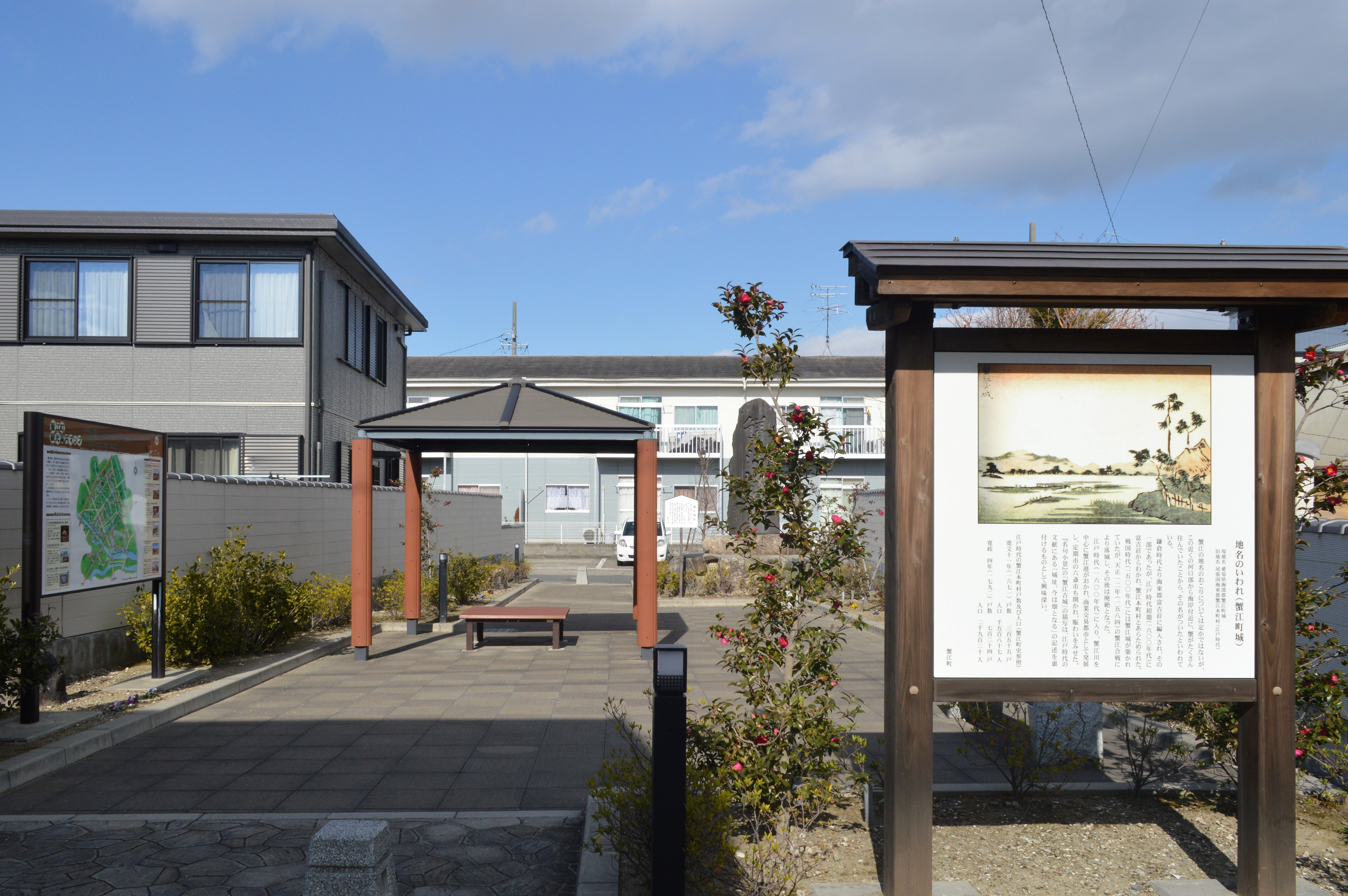
Kanie Castle site park

After the battle of Nagakute in April, the front line in northern Owari reached a stalemate. At this time, Kanie Castle was located about three miles between Ieyasu's Kiyosu Castle and Nobuo's Nagashima Castle, and was connected to the Mie moat and three castles: Ono Castle, Shimojima Castle, and Maeda Castle. Kanie castle faced the sea and was one of the leading ports in Owari, along with Atsuta and Tsushima. Shimojima.

Meanwhile, Takigawa Kazumasu had been dispatched to his former territories of northern Ise and Nagashima in Owari. Maeda Yojurō (Maeda Tanetoshi or Nagasada ) was guarding the castle while he was away. Kazumasu, seeing Tanetoshi as his cousin, was successful in persuading him to side with the Toyotomi forces. Maeda Nagatane defending the subsidiary castle of Maeda Castle, and Maeda Yoheiji (Maeda Sadatoshi), defending Shimoichiba Castle, agreed to join the attack. However, Yamaguchi Shigemasa, defending Ono Castle, refused to do so. On the night of June 15, Kazumasu asked Kuki Yoshitaka to attack Ono Castle from the sea. However, Shigemasa mounted a fierce counterattack on the riverbank. Meanwhile, Ii Naomasa, hearing the news, sent warships to reinforce the intercepting effort and blocked the river, forcing them to retreat without even being able to land. Upon hearing the news, Nobukatsu sent Kajikawa Hidemori and Kosaka Yukichi to reinforce Ono Castle. On June 16, Kazumasu landed nearby in a warship and attempted to enter Kanie Castle, but was blocked by Naomasa, Mizuno Katsunari, and others. Only Takigawa Kazutada 's troops were able to enter the castle, and the main force was forced to wait off the coast of Kanie. Ieyasu and Nobukatsu consulted and decided to dispatch Sakakibara Yasumasa and Oda Nagamasu to attack Shimoichiba Castle. Kazumasu and Yoshitaka attempted to send reinforcements to Shimoichiba Castle by boat, but Nagamori Okabe (on the Tokugawa side) and Shigemasa, on Nobukatsu's side, intercepted their attempt, seizing Yoshitaka's vanguard ship and capturing Yoshitaka's nephew (younger brother), Kuki Chobei. Waiting off the coast of Kanie, Kazumasu considered evacuating his allies from Kanie Castle, as it was isolated and dangerous. However, Nobukatsu led an attack with several large ships, causing Kuki's ships to retreat. Kazumasu was forced to abandon his escape plan, and instead, Kazumasu entered Kanie Castle to reunite with his allies, and together they were surrounded. In this battle, Nobukatsu achieved great success, capturing Kazumasu's horse banner and beheading many enemy heads. Tokugawa vassals Mamiya Nobutaka and Matsudaira Tadatsuna (Shinsuke) were killed in this battle.

On June 18, Ieyasu and Nobuo led 20,000 soldiers and besieged Kanie, Maeda, and Shimojima. Kanie castle was defended by Maeda Nagatane and Takigawa Kazumasu. Tadatsugu, Okanabe Mori, and Yamaguchi Shigemasa spearheaded the attack of Shimojima castle, while Sakakibara Yasumasa, Osuga Yasutaka were deployed to capture any fleeing defenders. On the afternoon, Shimoichiba Castle fell to an attack by the forces led by Yasumasa Sakakibara, Nagamasa Oda, and Maeda Sadatoshi was beheaded by a retainer of Shigemasa Yamaguchi. Ieyasu assigned Nagamori Okamoto to defend the castle .

On June 21, receiving word that Hideyoshi had again marched to Omi, Nobukatsu and Ieyasu launched a forceful attack on Kanie Castle on the 22nd. From the southern Ote-Umikai Gate, Sakakibara Yasumasa, Matsudaira Ietada, Niwa Ujitsugu (Tokugawa forces), and Amano Yukimitsu (Nobukatsu's forces) launched a fierce attack from three sides. From the eastern Maedaguchi Gate, Ieyasu led the Iga forces of Matsudaira Yasutada, Honda Tadakatsu, Ishikawa Yasumichi, and Hattori Hanzō. From the western Inuiguchi Gate, Nobukatsu's main force, along with Osuka Yasutaka and Mizuno Tadashige (Tokugawa forces), launched a fierce all-out attack. Takigawa Kazumasu, too, divided his army of about 1,000 men into three groups (Tanizaki Chuemon, Heki Gozaemon, and Takigawa Noritada) and put up a fierce resistance, but due to his inferior numbers, he withdrew his troops and abandoned the Sannomaru (Outer bailey of a Japanese Castle). The attackers occupied the Sannomaru and erected watchtowers from which they fired gunfire at the Honmaru and Ninomaru (Inner baileys of a Japanese castle), gradually lowering morale within the castle. On June 23, Ishikawa Kazumasa and Abe Nobukatsu, along with Nobukatsu's forces, launched a surprise attack on Maeda Castle, forcing Maeda Nagatane to make peace, surrender the castle, and retreat to Mino.

On June 23, Ieyasu entered the Kanie castle with Sakakibara Yasumasa after it was subdued.

=== After the Kanie siege ===
On June 29, Nobukatsu sent Narumi Kitaro, a retainer of Oda Nagamasu, as an emissary to urge Kazumasu to surrender. Kazumasu gladly sent Tsuda Tōzaburō to negotiate, but Ieyasu's condition was that he surrender the head of the Tanetoshi. Kazumasu accepted this and submitted a written pledge.

On July 3, Kazumasu handed over Takigawa Akemasu and Tsuda Tōzaburō to the opposing side as hostages, while Ieyasu took Ōsuka Yasutaka into the castle and held him hostage. Maeda Yojūrō, sensing danger, attempted to flee but was captured and killed. Kazumasu offered his cousin's head and surrendered the castle. After the hostage exchange, he attempted to return to Ise, but Tomita Isshiro, commanding Kizuku Castle (or Kobe Castle ), was suspicious of the castle's surrender without Hideyoshi's permission and refused entry. Takigawa Kazumasu, suffering a disastrous defeat, was forced to flee to Myoshinji Temple in Kyoto. Ieyasu returned Sakuma Nobuhide to Kanie Castle and had Maeda Castle and Shimoichiba Castle demolished. On the 5th, Nobukatsu and Ieyasu encamped in Kuwana. After patrolling Kobe and Shirako, he ordered the construction of a fort at Hamada ( Hamada Castle ) and assigned Takigawa Taketoshi and Mikumo Narimochi to defend it. On July 12, Kizukuri Nagamasa crossed the Kumozu River and marched to Suga (Suga) to engage in battle with Gamou Gosei. Nagamasa was wounded, but Kizukuri's forces counterattacked, defeated the Gamou forces, and returned to Togi. On July 13, Ieyasu placed Ishikawa Kazumasa in Kuwana Castle and returned to Kiyosu Castle. Sometime in July, Sassa Narimasa suddenly changed sides to the Oda - Tokugawa forces. It is believed that Narimasa decided to accept the invitation from the Oda-Tokugawa side after hearing from Heizaemon, who was among the Hokuriku forces who had returned home, that he had been informed of the difficulties the Hashiba forces were facing.

In August 19, Tokugawa clan vassal Honda Masanobu sent a letter to the Chosokabe clan telling them Nobukatsu also promised that he would give Bizen Province to Chikayasu. Nobukatsu asked Kosokabe Chikayasu to cross the sea to the mainland and attack Hideyoshi's armies at Settsu Province or Harima Province. Although this threat made Hideyoshi return to Osaka while he was still camped in Komaki, Chosokabe Motochika was unable to act easily due to the local resistance towards the Chosokabe clan at Iyo Province, by local daimyo lords, the movement of the Mōri clan, and the threats from Hideyoshi's generals such as Sengoku Hidehisa and Sogo Masayuki. Later in August 27, Hideyoshi again marched into Mino Province, climbing Mount Ninomiya to analyze the Tokugawa side's situation and closing in on them the next day. Nobukatsu and Ieyasu also left Kiyosu Castle and marched to Iwakura Castle to confront them. Perhaps conscious of the repeated defeats of his subordinates, Hideyoshi decided to attempt to mediate between Nobukatsu and Ieyasu through Niwa Nagahide on September 2. Nobukatsu and Ieyasu were also in a precarious situation, as the reinforcements they had counted on from the Chōsokabe and Hōjō clans had not arrived. However, Hideyoshi's unilateral demands (to hold hostages Nobukatsu's daughter, Ieyasu's second son and brother, and the children of Ishikawa Kazumasa, Oda Nagamasu, and Takigawa Taketoshi, and to meet in Owari) were unacceptable, and the two sides parted ways on the September 6. The two armies again faced off against each other with their full forces.

On September 17, Hideyoshi withdrew his forces to Ōgaki, passed through Ōmi-Sakamoto and Kyoto, and returned to Osaka on October 6.Consequently, in mid-October, Ieyasu returned to Okazaki Castle after arranging garrisons, while Nobukatsu went back to Nagashima Castle.

On the 9th day of the ninth month (12 October), Sassa Narimasa, at the behest of Ieyasu, attacked Suemori Castle in Noto Province, forcing out its resident; later Maeda Toshiie arrived in the middle of the night, and defeated the Sassa forces.group. Later, Hideyoshi besieged Kuwana Castle, where Oda Nobukatsu was holed up, but Mizuno Tadashige and his men held out and repelled the attack. During the battle at Kuwana, Tadashige's eldest son, Katsunari, killed Tadashige's vassal, Tominaga Hanbei, claiming that his father had punished him for slander. Tadashige, hearing his father's explanation in Komaki, did not forgive him and banished him. Hideyoshi reached Ōmi-Sakamoto on October 20, then marched south and encamped at Ise-Hatsu on October 23. He stationed Gamo Ujisato at Nawa Castle and Hasegawa Iemasa at Kuwabe Castle for defense. Nobukatsu immediately informed Sakai Tadatsugu at Kiyosu Castle. On November 9, Ieyasu marched to Kiyosu and dispatched Sakai Tadatsugu to reinforce Ishikawa Kazumasa at Kuwana Castle.

In the same month, Hideyoshi besieged Kuwana Castle, where Oda Nobukatsu was holed up, but Tadashige and his men held out and repelled the attack. During the battle at Kuwana, Tadashige's eldest son, Katsunari, killed Tadashige's vassal, Tominaga Hanbei, claiming that his father had punished him for slander. Tadashige, hearing his son's explanation in Komaki, did not forgive him and banished him. On September 17, Hideyoshi withdrew his forces to Ōgaki, passed through Ōmi-Sakamoto and Kyoto, and returned to Osaka on October 6.Consequently, in mid-October, Ieyasu returned to Okazaki Castle after arranging garrisons, while Nobukatsu went back to Nagashima Castle.Seeing this, Hideyoshi reached Ōmi-Sakamoto on October 20, then marched south and encamped at Ise-Hatsu on October 23. He stationed Gamo Ujisato at Nawa Castle and Hasegawa Iemasa at Kuwabe Castle for defense. Nobukatsu immediately informed Sakai Tadatsugu at Kiyosu Castle. On November 9, Ieyasu marched to Kiyosu and dispatched Sakai Tadatsugu to reinforce Ishikawa Kazumasa at Kuwana Castle.

In the end of October, the siege of Togi ended when the chief priest Gyoei of Isshinden Senshu-ji Temple mediated a peace agreement. When Nagamasa Kizukuri surrendered the castle to the Gamo forces and retreated, Nobukatsu gave him 10,270 kan-worth of land in Inabe County, where he built Tanabe Castle and moved there.

== Truce ==
On November 11 Hideyoshi was to meet Nobukatsu at the Ise Yada River. He was going to cross the Machiya River so Hideyoshi sat on a stool and waited for Nobukatsu to arrive. Nobukatsu, who was riding horseback, dismounted upon seeing Hideyoshi. While the latter prostrated himself while respectfully presented Nobukatsu with 20 large coins, a sword and a wakizashi belonging to Fudo Kuniyuki, and 35,000 straw sacks of military provisions captured from the revolt in northern Ise. On November 15, Nobukatsu made a separate peace with Hideyoshi and became his vassal, so Tadashige became a subordinate vassal. In February 1585, when Hideyoshi raised an army to attack Saiga, Nobukatsu ordered him to march on the 12th of the same month. Although the exact date is unclear, it appears that Tadashige became Hideyoshi's direct vassal around this time. In September, Hideyoshi granted him an additional 728 koku of land in Kanda, Toshima County, Settsu Province.

Though Ieyasu had gained the advantage in both engagements, Hideyoshi and Ieyasu did make peace with each other in the early part of 1585. Oda Nagamasu become the peacemakers between Tokugawa Ieyasu and Toyotomi Hideyoshi, also between Sassa Narimasa and Maeda Toshiie. In the words of George Sansom, "...both men were too sensible to waste strength on a foolish quarrel." Hideyoshi and Ieyasu had both served Oda Nobunaga and had not previously come into conflict; this would in fact be their only period of enmity.

In any case, in the end Ieyasu finally agreed for truce. He sent his son, Ogimaru (later Yuki Hideyasu), as a hostage to Hideyoshi, thus ending the conflict. followed by Hideyoshi sending his younger sister Asahi no kata and mother Ōmandokoro to Tokugawa Ieyasu as hostages as a sign of goodwill. However, Honda Shigetsugu, senior vassal of Ieyasu, warned Ieyasu about the possibility that Hideyoshi would probably resort to tricking them during the hostage-exchange agreement by swapping his mother, who was agreed to go to the Tokugawa clan, with other court ladies. After the Interview with the Toyotomi, Shigetsugu was appointed along with Ii Naomasa and Ōkubo Tadayo in charge of Castle Okazaki. Later, there was an incident when Ieyasu was on his way visiting Hideyoshi in Kyōto. Shigetsugu feared the safety of Ieyasu in Kyōto. Shigetsugu then piled wood blocks around the residence of Ōmandokoro, who at that time served as hostage and taken residence in Mikawa as part of the truce between the Tokugawa clan and the Toyotomi clan. He said that he would burn Ōmandokoro if something happened to Ieyasu in Kyōto.

On December 14, Nobukatsu went to Hamamatsu Castle in Totomi Province to express his gratitude to Tokugawa Ieyasu for his efforts in providing reinforcements, before returning on December 25. Historian Shiba Hiroyuki points out that after this peace treaty, Hideyoshi appointed Nobukatsu as the official head of the Oda clan, replacing him as Sanboshi's representative.

In his Nihon Gaishi ("Unofficial History of Japan"), Rai San'yō opined that Ieyasu's most important moment which truly propelled him to become the ruler of Japan was not the siege of Osaka or the battle of Sekigahara, but Komaki-Nagakute. Despite no territorial gains at all, Japanese researchers had viewed that the effect in the aftermath of this war was the shifting political balance and prestige within the territories of Oda clan that now dominated between Hideyoshi and Ieyasu, due to this patronage to Nobukatsu, while Nobukatsu's political importance itself gradually decreased.

=== 1586 Earthquake and flood in Japan ===
Subsequent with the ongoing hostility, from May to July, heavy rains fell constantly from the Kantō region to the Tōkai region, in what was dubbed the "heaviest flood in 50 years" in the historical record of Ietada-nikki.

In the middle of this conflict, the 1586 Tenshō earthquake occurred. For long time, it was widely believed the devastation of the Tokugawa clan's territory made it difficult to continue fighting against the Toyotomi government and they were forced to rebuild their country. This was a dangerous situation for the Tokugawa clan which could have resulted in their annihilation due to the Oda clan collapsing after Nobunaga's death.

However, in 21st century, Japanese researchers of earthquake history have contested such a view. After Hideyoshi reached a peace agreement with Nobukatsu, followed by Ieyasu's repeated refusal to also submit to Hideyoshi, the earthquake extensively damaged Osaka. This caused Hideyoshi to abort the campaign against Ieyasu. Historian Masaru Hirayama also Supported this view. By reviewing the pattern of the said earthquake through historical record, the disaster has devastated the majority of Toyotomi's controlled territories, while Mikawa province which controlled by Tokugawa was only hit by minor fraction of the earthquake. By this knowledge, Hirayama viewed that the disaster was actually somewhat helped Ieyasu in this conflict.

After the earthquake, Nobukatsu moved from Nagashima Castle to Kiyosu Castle, which he extensively renovated.

== National Historic Site ==
The Nagakute Battlefield Historic Site (長久手古戦場, Nagakute Kosenjō ato) in the city of Nagakute was designated a National Historic Site of Japan in 1939. The designation includes Mount Mihata (御旗山), Mount Irogane (色金山), and the head mound (首塚) It is about a 3-minute walk from Nagakute Kosenjō Station on the Linimo maglev line.

== Nomenclature ==
During the Edo period, the public records of the Tokugawa clan and the shogunate refer to these battles as Battle of Komaki (小牧陣 Komaki no Jin). However, there are also documents that refer to it as the Battle of Iwasakiguchi (岩崎口の戦い Iwasakiguchi no Tatakai). There are places where the fighting in Nagakute is called the Battle of Nagakute (長久手合戦 Nagakute Gassen), but the two battles have generally been merged into one. Many other names have also been used to describe these battles, some of which separate the two, while the others keep them together. During the Meiji Restoration, the various Japanese words for battles, campaigns, etc., were mostly unified, leading to it sometimes being called the Komaki and Nagakute Campaign (小牧・長久手の役 Komaki-Nagakute no Eki). Through all of this, though, "Battle of Komaki and Nagakute" has come to be the accepted name.

== See also ==
- Tenshō-Jingo war
- Ikeda Sen
- List of Historic Sites of Japan (Aichi)

== Bibliography ==
- Fukushima, Katsuhiko (2017). "天正十二年小牧・長久手合戦と丹波国衆" [The Battle of Komaki and Nagakute in 1581 and the Tanba Kokushu]. 丹波 (19): 16–32.
- Fukushima, Katsuhiko (2023). "荻野直正（赤井直正）―明智光秀の前に立ちはだかった"名高キ武士" / Ogino Naomasa (Akai Naomasa) - The "famous warrior" who stood in the way of Akechi Mitsuhide". In Amano, Tadayuki (ed.). 戦国武将列伝8 畿内編 下 [Sengoku Warlords' Biographies 8: Kinai Volume 2]. 戎光祥出版. pp. 159–168. ISBN 978-4-86403-447-0.
- Iwasaki Yoshihiko (2000). "羽柴秀吉と小牧・長久手の戦い" [Hashiba Hideyoshi and the Battle of Komaki and Nagakute]. 愛知県史研究 (in Japanese) (4). 愛知県.
- Hirayama, Masaru (2024). 小牧・長久手合戦 秀吉と家康、天下分け目の真相 [The Battle of Komaki and Nagakute: Hideyoshi and Ieyasu] (in Japanese) (増補改訂版 ed.). KADOKAWA. ISBN 978-4040824949.
- Arthur Lindsay Sadler (2014). The Maker of Modern Japan The Life of Tokugawa Ieyasu. Taylor & Francis. ISBN 9781136924705.
- Stephen Turnbull (2013). The Samurai A Military History. Taylor & Francis. pp. 162–163. ISBN 9781134243693.
- Tetsuo Owada (2006). "秀吉の天下統一戦争" [Hideyoshi's War to Unify Japan]. 織田信長家臣人名辞典 (in Japanese) (第2版 ed.). 吉川弘文館. ISBN 4642063250.
- 参謀本部 編 (1978). 日本戦史第13巻 小牧役 [Japanese War History Volume 13: Komaki Role] (in Japanese). "modern digital library edit of original edition 1908"
