= The Samurai and the Prisoner =

- Theatrical release poster
- Japanese: 黒牢城
- Directed by: Kiyoshi Kurosawa
- Screenplay by: Kiyoshi Kurosawa
- Based on: The Samurai and the Prisoner by Honobu Yonezawa
- Produced by: Junyuki Shimoba; Tsutomu Tsuchikawa
- Starring: Masahiro Motoki; Masaki Suda; Yuriko Yoshitaka; Munetaka Aoki
- Cinematography: Yasuyuki Sasaki
- Edited by: Kôichi Takahashi
- Music by: Yoshihiro Hanno
- Production companies: Shochiku Film Studio; TBS Pictures
- Distributed by: Shochiku
- Release dates: 19 May 2026 (Cannes); 19 June 2026 (Japan)
- Running time: 147 minutes
- Country: Japan
- Language: Japanese
- Box office: $7 million

The Samurai and the Prisoner (黒牢城, Kokurōjō) is a 2026 Japanese historical drama mystery film written and directed by Kiyoshi Kurosawa and based on the novel of same name by Honobu Yonezawa. It stars Masahiro Motoki, Masaki Suda, Yuriko Yoshitaka, Munetaka Aoki, and Ryota Miyadate. It follows Masahiro Motoki as Araki Murashige during the siege of Arioka Castle in 1579.

The film had its world premiere at the Cannes Premiere section of the 2026 Cannes Film Festival on 19 May. It was followed by its theatrical release in Japan by Shochiku on 19 June.

== Plot ==
In 1578, Araki Murashige, the merciful lord of Settsu, rebels against brutal warlord Oda Nobunaga, barricading himself inside Arioka Castle upon which Nobunaga lays siege. Murashige's retainers await reinforcements from Mōri Terumoto in Harima Province. Oda sends military strategist Kuroda Kanbei, who implores Murashige to abandon his rebellion; Murashige imprisons Kanbei in the dungeon.

Lord of Ōwada Castle Abe Jūemon defects to Nobunaga in winter. His son, Jinen, is kept hostage in Arioka. Though it is customary for hostages to be crucified, Jinen, a Shinshū Buddhist, begs to be killed via sword to earn him entry into Paradise. Murashige imprisons him. Sometime later, Jinen is found dead, seemingly from an arrow shot, but no arrow is found. Murashige collects testimonies from those present and brings them to Kanbei, who recites a poem; Murashige deduces the identity of the killer, whom he spares but sends into battle, where he is killed.

In spring, Murashige's retainer Ichirōza finds an army led by Ōtsu Nagamasa preparing to attack, hoping to impress Nobunaga. Murashige ambushes the army, assisted by the Buddhist Saika Clan under Saika Magoroku and the Christian Takatsuki Clan under Takayama Dario. Swordsman Hori Yataro attacks Murashige's camp, killing Ichirōza before being killed himself. Murashige gathers their severed heads to deduce who killed Nagamasa. One of the heads is later swapped with Yatarō's, unnerving the villagers. The tension between the clans leads to the local Christian church being burned. Murashige consults Kanbei, who reveals that Nagamasa's head was not taken – he had his helmet, signifying him as a commander, removed for reconnaissance. Murashige himself killed Nagamasa, resolving the dispute between the clans.

In summer, Murashige plans to surrender to Nobunaga, allowing him to regroup his forces through a liaison with Nobunaga's retainer Akechi Mitsuhide. Mitsuhide requests Murashige's valuable tea urn Tora-saru as proof of surrender, which Murashige sends with his envoy, the Buddhist priest Muhen. That night, Muhen and swordsman Akioka Shironosuke are found dead in their lodgings. A search proves that the letter to Mitsuhide was discovered but not taken, and Tora-saru has been stolen. One day, Kanbei's relative Zensuke sneaks into Arioka and reveals that Kanbei's son, Shōjumaru, whom Kanbei wanted to grant the title of Kuroda clan head, has been killed by Oda, who assumed Kanbei had defected. Murashige unshackles and invites him to join his war council. Kanbei declines, claiming the samurai of Settsu would not accept a man from Harima. Murashige realizes that his retainer Notō killed Muhen when a temple-hand who has never seen Muhen recognizes Notō as Muhen. Murashige chases Nōto onto the ramparts and accuses him of being an agent for Nobunaga; Notō attempts to reveal the secret of Murashige's surrender, but is shot, then struck by lightning and killed. Upon retrieving Tora-saru, Murashige declares that he will not use his worldly treasures as tools to win wars anymore, and will treasure them instead.

In autumn, with his vassals losing faith and Mōri's troops not arriving, Kanbei helps Murashige deduce that his wife, Lady Chiyoho, orchestrated Jinen's death, the switching of the heads by the maids, and the shooting of Notō. Upon being confronted, Chiyoho recounts the siege of Nagashima, where the Buddhist Ikkō-ikki believed that retreat was the way to Hell and charging into battle would pave the way to Paradise, causing a massacre. Through these apparent acts of divine punishment, she had hoped to prove that salvation is available to everyone, even the meek and cowardly. Murashige visits Kanbei in the dungeon; over drinks, Kanbei advises him to seek out Mōri in Harima via a sea route. Despite realizing Kanbei is plotting against him and understanding that this would lead to his downfall as he would be disgraced for having abandoned Arioka, Murashige agrees, ordering his retainers to surrender peacefully and say that he has fled in the event of the castle being taken. One by one, Murashige's companions ask to return to Arioka, claiming their loyalties lie with the castle, not its lord. With only one person in his entourage, Murashige commences his journey.

An epilogue card reveals that Nobunaga successfully captured the castle after Murashige's departure, but perished three years later when a rebellion instigated by Akechi Mitsuhide culminated in the Honnō-ji Incident. Murashige, who survived, became a famous tea master.

== Cast ==
- Masahiro Motoki as Araki Murashige
- Masaki Suda as Kuroda Kanbei
- Yuriko Yoshitaka as Chiyoho, Murashige's wife
- Munetaka Aoki as Araki Kyuzaemon
- Ryota Miyadate as Inui Sukesaburo
- Tasuku Emoto as Saika Sagehari
- Joe Odagiri as Koori Juemon
- Yūsuke Santamaria as Akioka Shironosuke
- Mitsuo Yoshihara as Kawarabayashi Notonyudo
- Ryota Bando as Kitagawara Yosaku
- Yoshiyoshi Arakawa as Muhen
- Kiyohiko Shibukawa as Saika Magoroku
- Ikkei Watanabe as Takayama Dario
- Yoshimasa Kondo as Nakanishi Shinpachiro
- Toshihiro Yashiba as Ikeda Izumi
- Masatoshi Kihara as Nomura Tango
- Kochi Yamato as Itami Ichirozaemon
- Mutsuo Yoshioka as Mori Kahei
- Shusaku Kamikawa as Teraotoko
- Oshiro Maeda as Kuriyama Zensuke
- Bando Shingo as Oda Nobunaga

== Production ==
The Samurai and the Prisoner is a film adaptation of Honobu Yonezawa's novel Kokurojo, which won the 166th Naoki Prize. Kurosawa said his producer gave him the book which coincided with his already existing interest in Araki Murashige and a desire to make a film about the subject.

Kiyoshi Kurosawa praised the brilliance of the original story, while also admitting to some personal apprehension, as this marks his first foray into both the period drama (jidaigeki) and mystery genres. He wanted to depict a traditional jidaigeki similar to ones from the 1950s, though he acknowledged that certain contemporary factors, including his own personal style, would influence the final product. Kurosawa was inspired by other jidaigeki, including Akira Kurosawa's Throne of Blood (1957) and Kenji Mizoguchi's The 47 Ronin (1941).

== Reception ==
=== Critical response ===
On the review aggregator website Rotten Tomatoes, the film holds an approval rating of 97%, based on 89 reviews, with an average rating of 8/10. The website's consensus reads: "Orchestrated with an intelligence as sharp as a katana's edge, The Samurai and the Prisoner is an elegant mystery that offers further proof of director Kiyoshi Kurosawa's mastery in any genre." On Metacritic, the film holds a weighted average score of 84 out of 100, based on 22 critics, indicating "universal acclaim".

In a positive review, Chase Hutchinson of TheWrap wrote, "It's a sweeping yet intimate film, taking on big questions facing 16th-century Japan by filtering them through a series of characters mostly just talking in rooms or out in some rather stunning landscapes."

Jessica Kiang of Variety called it a "highly entertaining adaptation" and appreciated the "stylish and sure" camerawork while singling out the cast for praise.

Brian Tallerico of RogerEbert.com gave the film four out of four stars and wrote, "It's a dense chamber piece with big ideas and riveting performances, but it's nothing without the genre-boundless acumen of its creator."

Ben Kenigsberg of The New York Times praised Kurosawa's direction, the cast's performances, and said the film was "densely plotted."

=== Box office ===
About one month after its release, on July 22, it was announced that the film had grossed over ¥1 billion at the Japanese box office, becoming the first film directed by Kiyoshi Kurosawa to achieve this milestone.

=== Accolades ===
Name of the award ceremony, year presented, category, nominee of the award, and the result of the nomination
Award	Date of ceremony	Category	Recipient(s)	Result	Ref.
Nikkan Sports Film Awards	27 December 2026	Best Supporting Actor	Masaki Suda	Pending	
