= The Ambition of Oda Nobuna =

Japanese light novel series

- Cover of the first light novel

織田信奈の野望 (Oda Nobuna no Yabō)
- Genre: Historical; Isekai; Romantic comedy
- Light novel
- Written by: Mikage Kasuga
- Illustrated by: Miyama-Zero
- Published by: SoftBank Creative (1–10); Fujimi Shobo (11–22)
- Imprint: GA Bunko (1–10); Fujimi Fantasia Bunko (11–22)
- Original run: August 15, 2009 – June 20, 2019
- Volumes: 22
- Manga
- Written by: Mikage Kasuga
- Illustrated by: Shigure Aoba
- Published by: Kadokawa Shoten
- Magazine: Comp Ace
- Original run: July 2011 – June 2014
- Volumes: 6
- Manga

Oda Nobuna no Yabō – Himesama to Issho Shutchōban
- Written by: Mikage Kasuga
- Illustrated by: Futago Minazuki
- Published by: Fujimi Shobo
- Magazine: Age Premium
- Original run: August 2011 – October 2012
- Volumes: 2
- Anime television series
- Directed by: Yūji Kumazawa
- Written by: Masashi Suzuki
- Music by: Yasuharu Takanashi
- Studio: Madhouse; Studio Gokumi
- Licensed by: AUS: Hanabee; NA: Sentai Filmworks; UK: MVM Films
- Original network: TV Tokyo, AT-X, TVA, TVO
- Original run: July 9, 2012 – September 24, 2012
- Episodes: 12
- icon

The Ambition of Oda Nobuna (織田信奈の野望; Oda Nobuna no Yabō) is a Japanese light novel series written by Mikage Kasuga and illustrated by Miyama-Zero. It was adapted into an anime television series animated by Madhouse and Studio Gokumi that aired from July to September 2012. Sentai Filmworks has licensed the series released it with an English dub in December 2014.

== Plot ==
Suddenly finding himself in the Sengoku period, average high school student Yoshiharu Sagara is about to be killed on the battlefield. He is saved by none other than the man who would later become the respected Hideyoshi Toyotomi, but at the cost of the latter's life. Yoshiharu notices differences from what he remembers from his favorite Sengoku era video game – Nobunaga's Ambition. In particular, there are many female daimyos who should be male to his knowledge. Yoshiharu begins working under a female daimyo Nobuna Oda, who nicknames him saru (サル, monkey) and probably corresponds to the male daimyo Nobunaga Oda in the real history. He serves Nobuna with hopes of saving her from Nobunaga's fate to be killed at the Honnō-ji Incident, not thinking of his way back home to the present-day world.

The story gradually reveals the difficulties in Yoshiharu's attempt. In addition to Nobuna's jealousy to other female daimyos attracted by him, two other persons who have historical foreknowledge hinder Yoshiharu's way. History itself seems to have a kind of resilience; if he succeeds in stopping an event, an equivalent event will occur at another opportunity.

Yoshiharu and Nobuna strive to overcome the problems, achieving her ambition of the unification of Japan and start trade and diplomacy on the equal footing with European nations. However, the Honnō-ji Incident eventually occurs. Yoshiharu, who survived the incident, repeats travel through time and space and finally saves Nobuna from the incident. The last pages of the novel suggest that Yoshiharu successfully rewrote the historical facts. A museum in his hometown holds an exhibition featuring Nobuna Oda – the woman who unified Japan and played an important role for the international society of the Age of Exploration.

== Background ==
The Ambition of Oda Nobuna is Mikage Kasuga's first work started in 2009, which was inspired by Noboru Yamaguchi's The Familiar of Zero (2004–2017). They share the plot that a boy comes to another world and works under a girl. Like Saito summoned to Halkeginia as Louise's familiar, Yoshiharu slips into a Sengoku world and becomes Nobuna's retainer. Kasuga recalls that such plot deviated from the pattern of those days' light novels in which someone came to a present-day Japanese school. Based on the differences between Nobuna's Sengoku world and that in the real history – as the author expresses as "strangely parallel worlds" (微妙にパラレルワールド, bimyōni parareru wārudo) – this novel can be located in the tradition of isekai fantasy.

Another background is the tradition of historical fictions on Sengoku period Japan. Kasuga refers to NHK's Taiga drama series such as Ōgon no Hibi in 1978 and Dokuganryū Masamune in 1987 as well as Ryōtarō Shiba's historical novel Sekigahara (関ヶ原) in 1966 and its TV drama adaptation by TBS in 1981. As the title implies, The Ambition of Oda Nobuna also cites the historical simulation video game series Nobunaga's Ambition (1983–) as well as other games with their names slightly changed (volume 1). Borrowing well-known events and characters from the preceding works, it can be said to be a kind of historical novel. Several reviewers evaluate it as a well-researched historical fiction. Shin'ya Yamada even recommends it to high school students as useful for studying history.

However, the novel does not follow the real history. Rather, it tells a story that is impossible as the historical fact. Tatsuya Tamai regards this novel as a composition of superficial and fragmented knowledge on history that readers would have shared through video games or school textbooks. Such composition also reflects preceding works. For the figure of Danjō (Hisahide Matsunaga) in particular, Kasuga acknowledges Reimei ni Somuku Mono (黎明に叛くもの) by Haruaki Utsukibara in 2003.

This novel characterizes many daimyos and samurais as women. Regarding the idea to depict Nobunaga as a woman, Kasuga cites Utsukibara's another work in 1999: Nobunaga, Aruiwa Taikanseru Andorogyunusu (信長 あるいは戴冠せるアンドロギュヌス). In addition, mentioning bloody conflicts between brothers of Sengoku daimyos depicted in NHK Taiga dramas, Kasuga explains the motivation toward revising history to avoid such tragedies by changing their gender. Nobuna's conquest consequently tends to refrain from casualties. Such characters as Dōsan Saitō, Yoshimoto Imagawa, and Shingen Takeda survive the historical events in which their counterparts in the real history died, making differences in what subsequently occurs.

== Characters ==
According to Tamai, character settings are the key to the composition of the fragments of knowledge to make up The Ambition of Oda Nobuna as entertainment contents. People in Kasuga's parallel world show differences from those in the real history, keeping their identity in trivial aspects. In addition to the most remarkable gender-swapping, basic properties like the dates of birth and death are often different. Moreover, each character has a strong impression based on appearance, personality, skills, habits, and the way of speaking.

The story tells how female Nobuna accomplishes her ambition of the unification of Japan in several years (Yoshiharu's monologue in volume 19), in which male Nobunaga failed after his thirty-year struggle, and how she then participates in global politics. In the beginning, Nobuna is already the head of the Oda clan in the Owari Province, but her position is instable. The story first depicts characters in the Oda clan and in its neighbors in the provinces of Mino, Mikawa, and Suruga. As Oda's reach expands, the story introduces more characters with more complex relationships among them. In addition to daimyos and their retainers, the author features a wide variety of characters: the empress and court nobles; merchants; mercenary soldiers; religious groups; and experts in literature, art, and tea ceremony. The last four volumes of the novel even introduce 16th century European political/military figures such as Elizabeth I from England, Don Juan de Austria from Spain, and Maurits van Nassau from the Netherland (as female characters), who never visited Japan in the real history.

=== Oda Clan ===
The status of the Oda clan as the daimyo of the Owari Province was established by the previous head Nobuhide. When he deceased, his daughter Nobuna inherited his position. The succession was not welcomed by those who supported Nobukatsu, a younger brother of Nobuna. They thus had an internal conflict, when Yoshiharu suddenly appeared on the field of the battle between Oda and Imagawa. (volume 1)

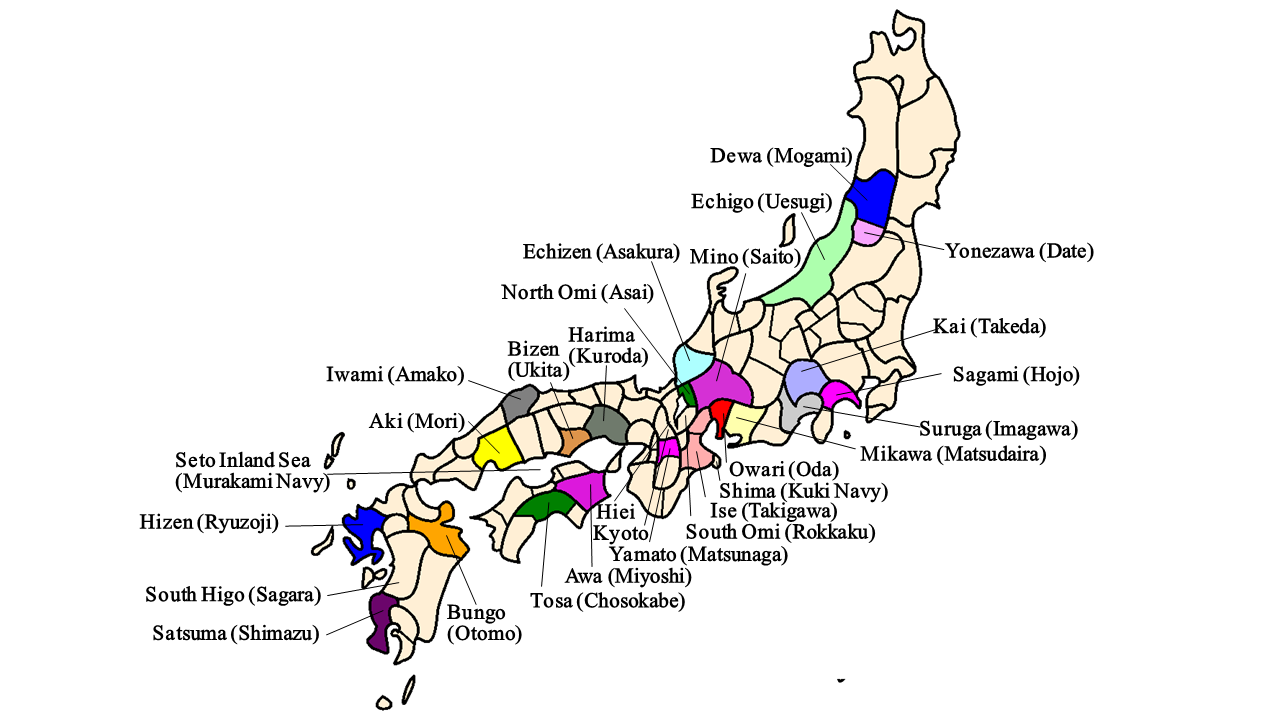
Map of provinces and clans.

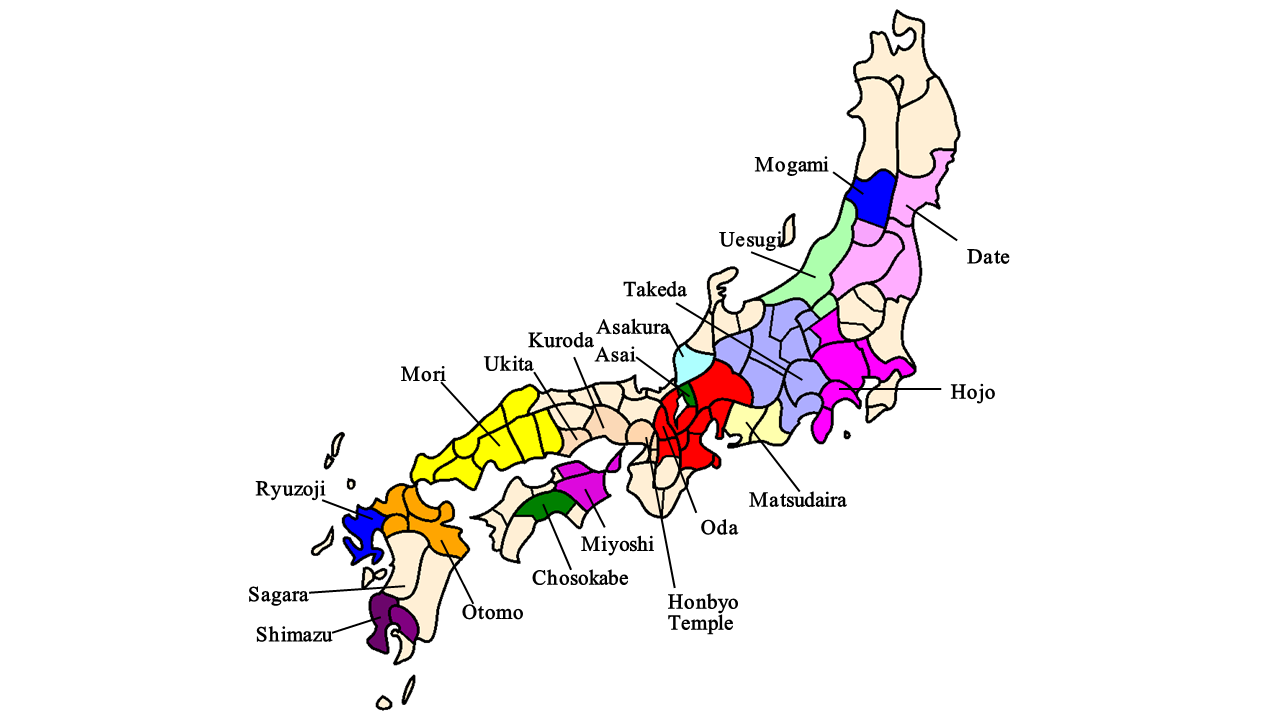
Territory of each faction as of the final episode of the anime series and the volume 4 of the novel.

Nobuna unifies her clan, negotiates with the neighbor daimyos, and defeats the Imagawa at the Battle of Okehazama (volume 1). She then conquers the Mino Province (volume 2) and marches into the capital Kyoto (volume 3). The expansion of Oda power so frightens other political forces that they form an anti-Oda alliance. Nobuna also expands her network and seeks allies. The focus of the story is thus on the people around the Oda clan.

Yoshiharu Sagara (相良 良晴, Sagara Yoshiharu)
Voiced by: Takuya Eguchi (Japanese); Clint Bickham (English)
A modern-day teenager who slipped into this strange Sengoku world. He has characteristics reminiscent of Hideyoshi Toyotomi including his nickname Saru. Grown up in a peaceful society, he had no combat skill except for the extraordinary reflexes to dodge attacks. Through experiences in battlefields, he is becoming an excellent warrior and commander. He is afraid of Nobuna's fate. Because she forbade him from telling it to her, Yoshiharu alone started his struggle to alter history. Being fond of women, he also alters history by saving other female daimyos.
He does not think of returning his present-day home, as a rare case for light novel characters in 2009.
Nobuna Oda (織田 信奈, Oda Nobuna)
Voiced by: Kanae Itō (Japanese); Emily Neves (English)
The daimyo of Owari. Known as the "Big Fool of Owari", her figure resembles the depiction of Nobunaga in historical materials. She is an ambitious teenage girl who plans conquer Japan to make it able to stand on equal ground with advanced European nations. For her cruel acts driven by anger, she is compared to Māra Pāpīyas (第六天魔王, Dairokuten Maō; lit. 'the Demon Lord of the Sixth Heaven'), an enemy of Buddha, despite her really kind heart. She develops feelings for Yoshiharu with tsundere attitudes, entering into a secret love relationship.
Mitsuhide Akechi (明智 光秀, Akechi Mitsuhide)
Voiced by: Sayuri Yahagi (Japanese); Krystal LaPorte (English)
Nicknamed Jūbei (十兵衛, Jūbē), she is a brilliant swordsmaster, sniper, tactician, and strategist. She served the Saitō in Mino and later becomes Nobuna's general. Jūbei wants to be acknowledged by others, especially by Nobuna – whom she admires. Her inability to read the atmosphere often cause troubles. After saving Yoshiharu's life in volume 4, Jūbei begins to develop feelings for him, admitting her love in volume 11.
The story reminds readers of the historical fact that Mitsuhide killed Nobunaga at Honnō-ji. As well as readers, Yoshiharu has been bothered thinking of the fates of Jūbei and Nobuna since volume 2.
Katsuie Shibata (柴田 勝家, Shibata Katsuie)
Voiced by: Hitomi Nabatame (Japanese); Carli Mosier (English)
Nicknamed Riku (六), she is the most brave general of the Oda. She was an aide to Nobuna's brother, but her true loyalty lay with Nobuna. After his failed rebellion, she became Nobuna's vassal (volume 1). She wears a steel breastplate that accentuates the shape of her bosom and is easily angered by those who stare at it. She becomes the daimyo of Echizen in volume 7.
Nagahide Niwa (丹羽 長秀, Niwa Nagahide)
Voiced by: Rei Matsuzaki (Japanese); Molly Searcy (English)
Nicknamed Manchiyo (万千代), she serves the Oda as a tactician. She always remains calm and makes appropriate decisions based on the situation. She also has a habit of assigning "points" to indicate her approval or disapproval of anything from battle strategies to bad jokes. She is considered to be the big sister overseeing the group of Oda vassals and cares for Nobuna greatly. She governs over Wakasa (volume 7) and oversees the construction of the Azuchi Castle (volume 9).
Hisahide Matsunaga (松永 久秀, Matsunaga Hisahide)
Voiced by: Masumi Asano (Japanese); Shelley Calene-Black (English)
Also known as Danjō (弾正), she is a daimyo of the Yamato Province. She is called "The Witch of Civil Wars" and is able to change her pipe into a spear or a sword and can use teleportation and illusion magic in anime. She allied with the Miyoshi Three and sought to burn the country to the ground. During the Battle at Kiyomizu Temple, however, Danjō finds people who would accept her. She surrenders and joins the Oda. She was acquainted with Dōsan in the past.
She respects Nobuna's naive and hopeful dreams. In volume 9, she attempts to clear infame rumors about Nobuna. She declares a rebellion against the Oda and finally kills herself to bear the blame of Nobuna's past actions.
Goemon Hachisuka (蜂須賀 五右衛門, Hachisuka Goemon)
Voiced by: Tomoko Kaneda (Japanese); Hilary Haag (English)
A ninja who stutters and bites her tongue (described with hiragana and almost unreadable in novel) whenever she has to speak extensively. She serves Yoshiharu after her former master Tōkichirō Kinoshita suddenly died. She is also the leader of Kawanami-shū (川並衆), a task force of militiamen, brigands, and hunters who adore her. Very little is known about her past as she does not talk about herself much. Due her small build, she is a very capable spy and is able to infiltrate prisons and castles. She is also strong in close combat.
Inuchiyo Maeda (前田 犬千代, Maeda Inuchiyo)
Voiced by: Misato Fukuen (Japanese); Caitlynn French (English)
She is a young girl and spear wielder with the tiger headdress and the big red spear. Although having the formal name Toshiie (利家), she is called Inuchiyo. She is also part of Yoshiharu's loyal followers and serves as his personal bodyguard.
In novel, unlike her anime counterpart, she does not initially wear her tiger headdress. After cutting down Nobukatsu's page, she is temporarily exiled. When she returns during the Battle of Okehazama, she shows her appearance with the tiger headdress for the first time.
Hanbē Takenaka (竹中 半兵衛, Takenaka Hanbee)
Voiced by: Yui Ogura (Japanese); Brittney Karbowski (English)
A gifted strategist serving Yoshiharu. She was a general of the Saitō clan, but she defected to the Oda in volume 2. She swears her loyalty to Yoshiharu and, through serving him, help Nobuna achieve her ambition. As an Onmyōji, she can summon powerful Shikigami familiars. She suffers from poor health, expecting that her life will be short.
An early plot of the novel prepared a story following the real history, in which Hanbē dies and Kanbē replaces her position. The author did not use it. Hanbē recovers from a critical condition in volume 9 and continues to support Yoshiharu throughout the story.
Zenki (前鬼)
Voiced by: Shinya Takahashi (Japanese); David Wald (English)
Hanbē's double and familiar. He is a powerful and intelligent spirit, because his true form is Abe no Seimei, although taking the form of a goblin fox usually. His power is nevertheless weakening, as the source of that was dried up. Zenki finally vanishes in volume 9. He foretells that Yoshiharu will have "women trouble" which comes true many times throughout the story.
Nene (ねね)
Voiced by: Natsuki Kitakata (Japanese); Allison Sumrall (English)
A childish girl and Yoshiharu's neighbor who treats Yoshiharu as her older brother. This relationship was arranged as a joke to fulfill Nobuna's promise to Yoshiharu to give him the most beautiful girl in the land (volume 1). Nobuna also uses Nene to keep Yoshiharu in check and to keep him from flirting with other women.
Tsuneoki Ikeda (池田 恒興, Ikeda Tsuneoki)
Voiced by: Natsumi Hioka (Japanese); Tiffany Grant (English)
A female samurai and scout of the Oda clan.
Narimasa Sassa (佐々 成政, Sassa Narimasa)
Voiced by: Erina Ogino (Japanese); Allison Sumrall (English)
Another female samurai and scout of the Oda clan.
Kazumasu Takigawa (滝川 一益, Takigawa Kazumasu)
Also known as Sakon (左近). The daimyo of the Ise Province, the imperial shrine maiden (斎宮, saigū) of Ise Shrine, and a retainer of Nobuna. She specializes in arquebus shooting and in naval battles using Kuki Navy. She is also a ninja who grew up in Kōga (甲賀), although she escaped from there. (volume 5)
Her figure is almost identical to Himiko. She also has psychic powers; she can force anyone to answer any question she asks truthfully by touching the forehead of said person. (volume 5)
Yoshitaka Kuki (九鬼 嘉隆, Kuki Yoshitaka)
The leader of the female-only Kuki Pirates or Kuki Navy and a retainer of Kazumasu. She is apparently on an age where her subordinates worry about her single marital status.
Kanbē Kuroda (黒田 官兵衛, Kuroda Kanbē)
The head of the Kuroda clan in the Harima Province, also called Don Simeon. She used to be an Onmyōji. She then learned alchemy and electromagnetism to be an expert in Western knowledge and machinery. She is assigned by Nobuna to be Yoshiharu's second strategist to establish the alliance of Harima daimyos to stop the advance of the Mōri army (volume 8).
Kanbē regarded Yoshiharu as a hindrance to Nobuna's goal, but later she changed her opinion. During the battles in Harima, she becomes close to Hanbē.
Shikanosuke Yamanaka (山中 鹿之助, Yamanaka Shikanosuke)
A former retainer of the Amako in Iwami and an enemy of the Mōri, who destroyed the Amako. She is also the leader of the Heroes of the Remnants of Amako. She becomes a retainer of Yoshiharu in volume 8. From her suggestive talk and behavior toward suffering and pain, Yoshiharu suspects she is a masochist.
Tsuchida-Gozen (土田 御前, Tsuchida Gozen)
Nobuna and Nobukatsu's mother. She has an estranged relationship with Nobuna, which worsens as the story goes. Reconciliation with the mother is a part of Nobuna's ambition, which realizes in volume 21.
Ujisato Gamo (蒲生 氏郷, Gamō Ujisato)
A philologist, archaeologist, and Nobuna's sworn-sister. She has collected the Three Imperial Regalia to use their miraculous power to help Nobuna. Ujisato is a Christian and Nobuna calls her by her baptismal name Leon.

=== Neighbors ===
Dōsan Saitō (斎藤 道三, Saitō Dōsan)
Voiced by: Mugihito (Japanese); Carl Masterson (English)
The daimyo of the Mino Province, to the north of Owari. With an impregnable fortress on an important strategic point, Mino is the first barrier to the ambition of Nobuna to unify the nation by force (天下布武, tenka fubu). Dōsan, an aged but ambitious man known as the "Viper of Mino", wanted to start a war with Nobuna, but after hearing her dream he allies with the Oda by appointing Nobuna as the next ruler of Mino. This angered his son Yoshitatsu, who launches rebellion against him. Yoshiharu saves Dōsan at Nagara-gawa. After the defeat of his son, he was able to retake his position as daimyo of Mino. As a father figure to her, Nobuna cares about Dōsan who she considers her father-in-law.
Kichō (帰蝶)
Dōsan's daughter. Upon Yoshitatsu's rebellion, Dōsan sends Kichō to Owari (with Jūbei's escote in anime). She hardly appears in the original story of light novel. However, she appears in the spin-off work, Azuchi Nikki 3.
Motoyasu Matsudaira (松平 元康, Matsudaira Motoyasu)
Voiced by: Suzuko Mimori (Japanese); Margaret McDonald (English)
The daimyo of the Mikawa Province. As sandwiched by Oda and Imagawa, she has carefully negotiated them. In the beginning, she was merely a minor vassal of the Imagawa. After the Imagawa's defeat at Okehazama, she gained independence and allied with the Oda. She and Nobuna were childhood friends, when she was a hostage of the Oda. She fears and respects Nobuna, and always intends to help Nobuna.
Later she changed her name to Ieyasu Tokugawa, due to the plot of her trusted vassal Masanobu Honda seeking independence from the Oda, which consequently forces the Tokugawa participate the Battle of Sekigahara on the anti-Oda side.
Hanzō Hattori (服部 半蔵, Hattori Hanzō)
Voiced by: Takahiro Sakurai (Japanese); Leraldo Anzaldua (English)
The leader of the ninja troop serving Motoyasu. He is consistently loyal to his master. He allows Yoshiharu to report Nobuna the location of Yoshimoto's army in Okehazama so that his master will no longer be a vassal of the Imagawas (volume 1). He often cooperates with Yoshiharu, ordered by Motoyasu or by his own decision.
Yoshimoto Imagawa (今川 義元, Imagawa Yoshimoto)
Voiced by: Mamiko Noto (Japanese); Nancy Novotny (English)
Former daimyo of Suruga and current shogun of Japan. She was considered the most likely one to conquer Japan, because of her large force and relation to the clan of Ashikaga shoguns. However, she was defeated at Okehazama by Oda's surprise attack. Yoshimoto was spared from being killed thanks to Yoshiharu's intervention (volume 1). Nobuna makes Yoshimoto the new shogun as her figurehead (volume 3). Yoshimoto usually acts as a foolish, extravagant, arrogant princess, but plays a critical role at critical moments to aid the Oda. She seems attracted to Yoshiharu, though he shows no particular care for this.

=== Ōmi and Echizen ===
The Ōmi Province is the land surrounding the Lake Biwa, being the eastern gateway to Kyoto. The South Ōmi is ruled by the Rokkaku, while the North is by the Asai (or Azai). Echizen is the province located to the north of Ōmi, ruled by the Asakura.

After conquering Ōmi, Nobuna builds Azuchi Castle there (volume 12). In volumes 16–18, battles occurred in Sekigahara, to the east of Azuchi.

Jōtei Rokkaku (六角承禎, Rokkaku Jōtei)
The daimyo of the South Ōmi. He is a pedophile who almost victimized Nagamasa Asai and Ujisato Gamō in their childhood.
Jōtei and his son are excellent archers. They make several shots to Nobuna cornered at a small fort during a battle in Osaka, but Yoshiharu defends the arrows with his body. (volume 11)
Hisamasa Asai (浅井 久政, Asai Hisamasa)
The Asai's previous head. He does not accept a woman as a daimyo, so that her daughter should disguised her gender to inherit the headship.
He also prefers the alliance with Asakura to that with Oda. When Oda and Asakura started war, he forced Nagamasa to cancel the alliance and attack the Oda at Kanegasaki. Hisamasa effectively takes the power of the Asai clan and fights the Oda under the alliance with the Asakura. Upon the Oda's victory, Hisamasa commits seppuku but not before leaving a message for his daughter to live her life as a girl.
Nagamasa Asai (浅井 長政, Asai Nagamasa)/Oichi (お市)
Voiced by: Mitsuki Saiga (Japanese); Blake Shepard (English)
The Asai's current head, a woman living as a man. She attempted to marry Nobuna, but failed. Instead, the Oda seal the alliance by giving Nobuna's sister Oichi to Nagamasa as the bride (in reality Oichi is Nobuna's brother Nobusumi, disguised as a girl). When the couple discover each other's true gender, Nobusumi and Nagamasa fall deeply in love. This makes Nagamasa a sincere ally of Oda. When Hisamasa ordered her to fight Nobuna, she refused it and is imprisoned (volume 3).
When the Asai was defeated, Nagamasa's death was announced, but she was secretly saved. Borrowing the name "Oichi", that Nobusumi used when he was disguised as a girl, she recovers her true gender and starts her new life with Nobusumi. (volume 7)
Nobukatsu Oda (織田 信勝, Oda Nobukatsu)/Nobusumi Tsuda (津田 信澄, Tsuda Nobusumi)/Oichi (お市)
Voiced by: Emiri Katō (Japanese); Shannon Emerick (English)
Nobuna's younger brother. He attempted a rebellion against Nobuna, but failed. He changed his name to Nobusumi Tsuda to show loyalty to Nobuna. By dropping the surname "Oda", he renounced the position of the daimyo of Owari.
He fell in love with Nagamasa, when they both disguised their gender (volume 3). After the end of the war between Oda and Asai-Asakura, they are finally reunited as lovers (volume 7).
Yoshikage Asakura (朝倉 義景, Asakura Yoshikage)
Voiced by: Ryōhei Kimura (Japanese); Greg Ayres (English)
The daimyo of Echizen and a former ally of the Miyoshi Three. After Konoe betrayed his allies at Mt. Hiei, Yoshikage canceled the alliance. Nevertheless, he is still at war with the Oda. He is immersed with The Tale of Genji and desires the most beautiful women in Japan, especially Nobuna.
During the climax of the war with the Oda, he is beheaded by Hisanaga Tsuchimikado and becomes a demon (鬼, oni) as a magical instrument of Onmyōdō (volume 7). The demon attacks Nobuna in Kyoto, but is defeated (volume 9). He is further reincarnated as a female warlord Murashige Araki, whose life is depicted in the spin-off Azuchi Nikki 1.
Naotaka and Naozumi Magara (真柄 直隆・直澄, Magara Naotaka, Naozumi)
Voiced by: Mikako Komatsu (Naotaka) Natsumi Takamori (Naozumi) (Japanese); Nancy Novotny (Naotaka), Tiffany Grant (Naozumi) (English)
Original characters for the TV anime version. Twin sister who serve the Asakura and renowned as beautiful but blood thirsty warriors. They were defeated by Katsuie during the Burning of Mt. Hiei, but spared from being killed.
Tsuchimikado Hisanaga (土御門 久脩)
An Onmyōji at the service of the Asakura and the current leader of the Tsuchimikado, the headmaster clan of Onmyōdō. He is a young boy but cruel and quite overconfident. When attacking Yoshiharu who is retreating from Kanegasaki, he states that the entire reason he appeared was to take Yoshiharu's head for the Asai and Asakura (volume 4). In Eizan (Mt. Hiei), he is defeated by Hanbē, who summons the most powerful ancestor of the Tsuchimikado family (volume 4). However, he later renews his confidence in defeating her, when Hanbē is rendered powerless (volume 7).

=== Christians ===
Missionaries and merchants came from Europe, and some Japanese people became interested in Christianity and were baptized. Nobuna is not a Christian, but she respects religious freedom and imports advanced European technology. She obtains an edict from the empress Himiko, authorizing the mission of Christianity (volume 3), and later establishes a mission school in the Castletown of Azuchi, gathering students from Christian daimyos like Sōrin Ōtomo (volume 12).

Although not included in the list below, the following people were also baptized: Mitsuhide Akechi (Gracia), Kanbē Kuroda (Don Simeon), Ujisato Gamō (Leon), and Yukinaga Konishi (Agostinho). (volumes 8–10 and 16)

Bontenmaru (梵天丸)
Voiced by: Rumi Ōkubo (Japanese); Margaret McDonald (English)
A daimyo of Ōshu in the Tohoku region and the future Masamune Date (伊達政宗, Date Masamune). She is a companion and bodyguard of Louise Frois and a potential ally of the Oda. Possessing heterochromia, she also has a case of chūnibyō (8th grader adolescent delusions), believing her red eye has special powers which is hidden under an eyepatch. Like Nobuna, she has an estranged relationship with her mother (volume 7). She is also the main character of the light novel spin off Jakigan Ryū Masamune.
Kojūrō Katakura (片倉 小十郎, Katakura Kojūrō)
Bontenmaru's aide and caretaker. She usually has to deal with Bontenmaru's antics and tries to keep her under control. For her androgynous appearance, she is often mistaken for a boy much to her displeasure. (volumes 7 and 19)
Louise Frois (ルイズ・フロイス, Ruizu Furoisu)
Voiced by: Rina Satō (Japanese); Kasi Hallowell (English)
A Portuguese nun and missionary. She has come to Japan to help the sick and defenseless. Noted for extremely large breasts, which she believes are sinful due to how others react to them, however, Yoshiharu convinces her that she is not a sinner (volume 3). She and Yoshiharu share same dream for establishing a peaceful world. She is the female version of Luís Fróis, who befriended the real-life Nobunaga Oda.
Organtino
An Italian missionary who first appears in volume 5 alongside the knight Giovanna L'Ortese on the "Shima España Isle" (志摩イスパニア島, Shima Isupania-tō). He is Louise's junior and looks up to her. Hearing about Nobuna's openness and good treatment of foreign cultures, he later cooperate with the Oda.
Giovanna L'Ortese
A knight of the honorable St. John Knights from Spain. She initially was seen as an enemy by Kazumasu. However, after dueling Yoshiharu, it was revealed that her intentions were not hostile. She becomes an ally of them (volume 5). She believes that eating and sleeping are the two most important things to a knight. She has a habit of blatantly ignoring conversations around her while eating.
Dom Justo Takayama (高山 ドン・ジュスト, Takayama Don Jusuto)
Voiced by: Seiro Ogino (Japanese); Scott Frerichs (English)
A Christian daimyo and lord of Takatsuki (near Kyoto, in the north of Settsu Province), who aided the Oda Faction during the Battle at Kiyomizu Temple in Kyoto. (volume 3)
Joaqim Konishi (小西 ジョウチン, Konishi Jōchin)
Voiced by: Tomoaki Maeno (Japanese); Nick Landis (English)
A Christian merchant and samurai who aided the Oda in the Battle at Kiyomizu Temple (volume 3).
Sōrin Ōtomo (大友 宗麟, Ōtomo Sōrin)
A Christian daimyo of the Bungo Province. Renowned as the "Queen of Bungo", she governs a wide territory of the northern Kyushu. She retains Gaspar Cabral as her military advisor. Due to her regret of letting her brothers die in war, she is in bad mental conditions so that she cannot be saved either by the Cristian belief or by romantic love.
Gaspar Cabral (ガスパール・カブラル)
The head of the Japanese branch of the Catholic Dominus Order. His figure resembles Xavier, but little is known about his past. He remembers only the phrase "Nobuna Oda of Japan" (Jipangu no Oda Nobuna). (volume 15)
He can foresee visions of future events through a magic stone called "Platonic Solid". Serving Sōrin, he tries to hinder the alteration of history by Yoshiharu.
Francisco Xavier (フランシスコ・ザビエル)
The first missionary in Japan. He met Nobuna and Sōrin during their childhood and had great influence on them. He died in Goa of India, before the story begins. A dialogue between him and Nobuna is described in the extra short story added to the volume 10 of the 2015 revised edition light novel.

=== Miyoshi Triumvirate (Miyoshi Three) and allies ===
The Miyoshi clan is based on the Awa Province of the Shikoku island. It served the Hosokawa, the deputy of the Muromachi shogunate, at Kyoto. After the Ōnin War, the Miyoshi had gained its power and effectively ruled Kyoto and its surrounding areas over the Ashikaga shoguns. However, the Miyoshi had an internal conflict following the death of the head Nagayoshi, with four retainers assuming the power. They called themselves the Miyoshi Three, despite being a group of four (volume 2 of the revised edition). Against the Oda's conquest of Kyoto, they seek coalition of several factions.

Sakihisa Konoe (近衛 前久, Konoe Sakihisa)
Voiced by: Seiro Ogino (Japanese); Mark Laskowski (English)
The imperial adviser (Kampaku). He is a manipulative politician who wants to pacify Japan under the empress Himiko.
In anime, he slowly loses his sanity and in a desperate attempt to kill Nobuna. He betrays his allies by setting Mount Hiei on fire, notwithstanding he and his allies are there. He is finally crushed by the collapsing Enryaku-ji temple.
In novel, he neither fights Nobuna nor dies at Mt. Hiei (called Eizan (叡山)). He consistently devotes himself in protecting the empress Himiko, retaining his manipulative and arrogant personality.
Later, he knows that Kazumasu is a sister of Himiko (volume 10) and that Yoshiharu is a descendent of the Sagara of Higo, related to the Fujiwara clan (volume 13). These make Konoe inclined to appoint Yoshiharu to the next Kampaku.
Sōkyū Tsuda (津田 宗及, Tsuda Sōkyū)
Voiced by: Kanehira Yamamoto (Japanese); Scotty Fults (English)
A rich merchant from Sakai. He joined Konoe's conspiracy hoping to gain a profit from it. After being betrayed by Konoe, he made peace with the Oda.
Gōsei Shōkakuin (正覚院 豪盛, Shōkakuin Gōsei)
Voiced by: Eiji Miyashita (Japanese); Rob Mungle (English)
The Buddhist head monk of the temple of Mt. Hiei. He hated foreigners for spreading Christianity. He joined Konoe's conspiracy to expel them from Japan. As Konoe lit Mount Hiei, Gōsei finally recognized the madness of Konoe. He fled the mountain but was captured. Shortly afterwards Louise joined Gōsei in praying to save the burning temple, much to his surprise. Recognizing the benevolent nature of the missionary, he made peace with the Oda and the Christians.
Masayasu Miyoshi (三好 政康, Miyoshi Masayasu)
Voiced by: Kanehira Yamamoto (Japanese); Scott Gibbs (English)
A general formerly working for the Miyoshi Three. He was one of the figurehead leaders of the alliance. After being defeated at Kyoto, he and his brothers fled to Shikoku.
Nagayasu Miyoshi (三好 長逸, Miyoshi Nagayasu)
Voiced by: Shuuhei Iwase (Japanese); Rob Nash (English)
Another former general of the Miyoshi Three and Masayasu's brother.

=== Honbyō Temple ===
Honbyō Temple (本猫寺) is the headquarter of Nyankō-shū (にゃんこう宗). They are the counterparts to Hongan-ji (本願寺) and Ikkō-shū (一向宗) in the real history. Nyankō-shū adores cats like gods and emphasizes laughter as a means of relief. Rituals at Honbyō Temple take the form of manzai (skit). This religion has spread and led popular uprising across Japan. The history of Nyankō-shū is explained in volume 6 of the revised edition.

Amid rising tensions between Oda and Honbyō Temple, they hold a soccer (南蛮蹴鞠, Nanban kemari) game, instead of war. This once leads to their reconciliation and an agreement is reached to hold a soccer game every year (volume 6). However, the second game is never held. Instead, war breaks out in Osaka (volume 10).

Kennyo (けんにょ)
The leader of Nyankō-shū. She is half human, half cat monster (nekomata), with the ears and tail of a cat, capable of regenerating. She believes that laughter is the best way to bring peace. After the first soccer game, she accepts disarming her forces, acting as a middleman between the Oda and the anti-Oda factions (volume 6).
In volume 9, she loses her powers and becomes a normal girl. She is thereby expelled from the temple.
Kyōnyo (きょうにょ)
Kennyo's younger sister, who has cat ears and tail as well as Kennyo. She has a hard line against Oda. After Kennyo was expelled, Kyōnyo takes the power of the sect and calls to arms the followers to cause a mass rebellion. She allies with Mōri to have war against Oda.
Magoichi Saika (雑賀 孫市, Saika Magoichi)
The leader of the Saika group, an ally of Honbyō Temple, expertized in arquebus shooting. She does not believe in the spiritual power of Nyankō-shū leaders. Disliking senseless casualty, Magoichi tries to persuade Kyōnyo not to involve ordinary people in the war, but failed.
Being a mercenary, she is later hired by Date (volume 7) or even by Oda (volume 17). She takes a liking to Yoshiharu and even wants him to become her husband.

=== Mōri Clan and allies ===
The Mōri are the most powerful force in western Japan. Based on the Aki Province, they effectively control almost the entire Chugoku region and the Seto Inland Sea through the alliance with the Ukita clan and the Murakami Navy. When Nobuna conquers Kyoto and its surrounding areas, the Harima Province to the west of Kyoto becomes the front line of the battle between Oda and Mōri (volume 8). Naval battles later occur in Osaka Bay (volumes 10 and 11).

Mōri's status was established by the previous head Motonari. He used his three children to expand the power of the clan. The eldest son Takamoto became the successor to the Mōri. Two daughters, Motoharu and Takakage, were adopted into different families: Kikkawa and Kobayakawa respectively. As Takamoto died young, Motoharu and Takakage substantially lead the Mōri.

Yoshiaki Ashikaga (足利 義昭, Ashikaga Yoshiaki)
A younger sister of Yoshiteru Ashikaga, the 13th Ashikaga shogun. Upon the Miyoshi Three's coup d'état, Yoshiteru and his sister fled to China in exile. Learning that Yoshimoto became the new shogun with the backing of the Oda, Yoshiaki returns to Japan to claim back what is rightfully hers. With the Mōri, she seeks help from anti-Oda factions to regain the shogunate.
Naoie Ukita (宇喜多 直家, Ukita Naoie)
The daimyo of Bizen, the east front of Mōri's territory. He serves the Mōri only to ensure his position. He prefers to manipulate his enemies and lure them into various traps. He is also an expert sniper.
He kills men without hesitation, but would never hurt women – although he may manipulate them. His last piece of benevolence goes to his daughter Hideie. (volumes 8 and 9)
Hideie Ukita (宇喜多 秀家, Ukita Hideie)
Naoie's only daughter. She does not want her father to lose the humanity.
Yukinaga Konishi (小西 行長, Konishi Yukinaga)
Also known as Yakurō (弥九郎), she is a daughter of Joaqim Konishi, a Christian merchant and samurai from Sakai. She serves as bodyguard for Hideie under Naoie's order in volume 9. She later cooperates with Yoshiharu in volumes 15 and 17.
Takakage Kobayakawa (小早川 隆景, Kobayakawa Takakage)
She is a famous general known to keep her cool no matter the situation. She believes Japan must be unified and be able to compete with European countries. Following the teachings of her father, she tries to determine who is the right person to take on the heavy responsibility to unify Japan. (volume 9)
At the first naval battle with the Kuki Navy, Takakage saves Yoshiharu who was hit with arrows and fell into the sea, almost dying. As Yoshiharu has lost his memory, he starts new life in the Murakami Navy and develops the relationship with Takakage. The romance between the two is depicted in volume 11 and the spin-off book Azuchi Nikki 2.
Motoharu Kikkawa (吉川 元春, Kikkawa Motoharu)
Older sister of Takakage with almost identical figure to her. In contrast to her sister, Motoharu is not a very deep thinker and only wants to see how things will go through. She is nicknamed "The Valiant General" and is the Mōri's number one leader in battles. Out of the battlefield, she writes derivative fantasies of love affairs between male warlords from old military stories. Takakage compares her to a Fujoshi. (volumes 10 and 11)
Takeyoshi Murakami (村上 武吉, Murakami Takeyoshi)
The Murakami Navy's leader, called "Pirate King", he is an ally of the Mōri, despite remaining semi-independent. He was close to deceased Takamoto, Takakage and Motoharu's older brother, and he sees himself as a protector for both sisters (volume 11).

=== Other daimyos ===
Shingen Takeda (武田 信玄, Takeda Shingen)
The daimyo of the Kai Province, at the central Japan. Called the "Tiger of Kai", she terrifies the neighbors with her strong armies. She also rivals with the equally renowned Kenshin Uesugi. In private, she goes by the name Katsuchiyo (勝千代), a lighthearted and cheerful girl. She regards Yoshiharu as the person whom her mentor Kansuke Yamamoto described to be the "man from the heavens" (volume 5). She later enters into a temporary alliance with the Oda (volume 7).
Being the rival of Kenshin, they repeatedly fought each other. Mikage Kasuga wrote the spin-off story Ten to Chi to Hime to for them.
Katsuyori Takeda (武田 勝頼, Takeda Katsuyori)
Shingen's younger sister.
Kenshin Uesugi (上杉 謙信, Uesugi Kenshin)
The daimyo of the Echigo Province of the Hokuriku region. She is a powerful warrior and viewed as a living god, nicknamed both "The Dragon of Echigo" and "The God of War" – indeed, she herself believes that she is an incarnation of Bishamonten, the Buddhist god of war (volume 12). She leads her "Army of Justice" to fight for those who are oppressed. She has the official authority to control the Kantō region as the deputy of shogun (volume 9), for which she collaborated with Konoe in the past (volume 10).
The spin-off series Ten to Chi to Hime to features her and her rival, Shingen. The author says that Kenshin was the most difficult character to create.
Kagekatsu Uesugi (上杉 景勝, Uesugi Kagekatsu)
Kenshin's younger sister.
Kanetsugu Naoe (直江 兼続, Naoe Kanetsugu)
A gifted military advisor of Kenshin. She has been dispatched several times to the Date. She has thereby been close to Kojūrō Katakura. (volumes 7, 19, and 20)
Ujiyasu Hōjō (北条 氏康, Hōjō Ujiyasu)
The daimyo of the Sagami Province of the Kantō region. Nicknamed the "Lion of Sagami", she is an ally of Shingen. Ujiyasu prefers defensive battles based on Odawara Castle. She does not directly interfere with Nobuna's campaign mainly unfolding far west of Sagami. However, she is an important diplomatic opponent of the Oda, because of her potential conflicts with the neighbors. (volume 7)
She employs the ninja troop named Fūma and dispatches them to various regions to purse Hojō's political strategy. She tries to assassinate Nobuna and Yoshiharu, and even Shingen, once she realizes they are defenseless (volume 7).
In volume 19, she makes the first contact with the Golden Crusade.
Senchiyo Manmi (万見 仙千代, Manmi Senchiyo)
A Konoe's spy sent to Nobuna. She fails her mission, is captured, and finally kills herself by intentionally stopping the heart. Danjō estimates that she would be a Fūma ninja and revives her body using ranjatai (蘭奢待, a piece of fragrant tree with mysterious medicinal properties) to create a new person called Kashin Koji.
Yoshiaki Mogami (最上 義光, Mogami Yoshiaki)
The Mogami clan rules the Dewa Province on the west coast of the Tohoku region. It often has territorial disputes with neighboring Date and Uesugi. The head is Yoshiaki. His younger sister Yoshihime (義姫) married into the Date and is the mother of Bontenmaru.
Yoshihi Sagara (相良 義陽, Sagara Yoshihi)
The Sagara clan rules the South of Higo Province in the Kyushu region. The head is Yoshiharu (義陽); confusingly, her name has the same pronunciation as the novel's main character's: "Yoshiharu Sagara". In volume 13, she hands over the headship to her sister, and changes the pronunciation of her name to "Yoshihi". She then becomes Yoshiharu's deputy and elder sister in-law. Yoshihi works with him until the farewell at the climax of the story.
Shimazu Sisters (島津四姉妹)
The Shimazu clan rules the Satsuma Province, the southern tip of the Kyushu island. It has rapidly expanded its power, with its brave soldiers and a large number of arquebuses. The head Yoshihisa (義久) works well with her three younger sisters, Yoshihiro (義弘), Toshihisa (歳久), and Iehisa (家久), to maintain the clan's unity.

=== Golden Crusade ===
A union of ambassadors and armed forces from Europe, called the "Golden Crusade" (黄金十字軍, Ōgon Jūjigun). They are under the complex motivation of the different interests among European states. In volumes 19 and 20, they gather off the coast of Sagami and, after some diplomatic process, declare war against Japan.

Francis Drake (フランシス・ドレイク)
The admiral of the navy of England. He is the father of Bontenmaru.
Elizabeth I (エリザベス一世)
The queen of England.
Tsunenaga Hasekura (支倉 常長, Hasekura Tsunenaga)
A Date's retainer. He was dispatched to Rome in behalf of Bontenmaru.

=== Other characters ===
Himiko (姫巫女)
Voiced by: Sumire Morohoshi (Japanese); Luci Christian (English)
The current Empress of Japan. She has inherited psychic powers from her ancestor, thus gaining the ability to read a person's heart and mind by touching him or her. Hence, when she meets Yoshiharu, she holds Yoshiharu in confidence and regards. Since she is still a child, Konoe is assisting her. The novel describes her words in hiragana scripts with a slightly royal tone to indicate her status and childness.
Sōkyū Imai (今井 宗久, Imai Sōkyū)
Voiced by: Tomoaki Maeno (Japanese); David Matranga (English)
A merchant from Sakai and a leader of Sakai's oligarchic local administration by rich merchants (会合衆, egōshū). An old friend of Nobuna's father, he is willing to help Nobuna anything involving finance. He also owns a monopoly in the takoyaki market.
Fujitaka Hosokawa (細川 藤孝, Hosokawa Fujitaka)
A younger brother of the previous shogun. He learned the future by deciphering the ancient prophetic book Kokin Denju and tries to counter Yoshiharu's alteration of history.
Guillaume Postel (ギヨーム・ポステル)
A French thinker who deeply influenced Xavier. He has secretly guarded Xavier's incorruptible body in Goa. Yoshiharu meets him on the way of traveling time and space. They revive Xavier's body. (volume 22)

== Media ==
=== Light novel ===
==== Original story ====
The Ambition of Oda Nobuna began as a light novel series written by Mikage Kasuga (春日みかげ) and illustrated by Miyama-Zero (みやま零). Volume 1–10 and a spin-off novel (see below) were published between August 15, 2009, and March 16, 2013, by SB Creative under their GA Bunko imprint. On April 19, 2014, volume 11 was published by Fujimi Shobo under their Fujimi Fantasia Bunko imprint and all further releases were published this way.

No.	Title	Japanese release date	Japanese ISBN
1	Oda Nobuna no Yabō (織田信奈の野望)	August 15, 2009	978-4-7973-5450-8
2	Oda Nobuna no Yabō 2 (織田信奈の野望 2)	February 15, 2010	978-4-7973-5744-8
3	Oda Nobuna no Yabō 3 (織田信奈の野望 3)	March 15, 2010	978-4-7973-5875-9
4	Oda Nobuna no Yabō 4 (織田信奈の野望 4)	September 15, 2010	978-4-7973-6123-0
5	Oda Nobuna no Yabō 5 (織田信奈の野望 5)	February 15, 2011	978-4-7973-6222-0
6	Oda Nobuna no Yabō 6 (織田信奈の野望 6)	June 15, 2011	978-4-7973-6442-2
7	Oda Nobuna no Yabō 7 (織田信奈の野望 7)	November 15, 2011	978-4-7973-6749-2
8	Oda Nobuna no Yabō 8 (織田信奈の野望 8)	March 15, 2012	978-4-7973-6898-7
9	Oda Nobuna no Yabō 9 (織田信奈の野望 9)	July 15, 2012	978-4-7973-7000-3
10	Oda Nobuna no Yabō 10 (織田信奈の野望 10)	March 16, 2013	978-4-7973-7234-2
11	Oda Nobuna no Yabō Zenkokuban 11 (織田信奈の野望 全国版 11)	April 19, 2014	978-4-04-712970-2
12	Oda Nobuna no Yabō Zenkokuban 12 (織田信奈の野望 全国版 12)	October 18, 2014	978-4-04-070290-2
13	Oda Nobuna no Yabō Zenkokuban 13 (織田信奈の野望 全国版 13)	May 20, 2015	978-4-04-070291-9
14	Oda Nobuna no Yabō Zenkokuban 14 (織田信奈の野望 全国版 14)	January 20, 2016	978-4-04-070704-4
15	Oda Nobuna no Yabō Zenkokuban 15 (織田信奈の野望 全国版 15)	May 20, 2016	978-4-04-070896-6
16	Oda Nobuna no Yabō Zenkokuban 16 (織田信奈の野望 全国版 16)	September 17, 2016	978-4-04-070900-0
17	Oda Nobuna no Yabō Zenkokuban 17 (織田信奈の野望 全国版 17)	January 20, 2017	978-4-04-072171-2
18	Oda Nobuna no Yabō Zenkokuban 18 (織田信奈の野望 全国版 18)	May 20, 2017	978-4-04-072304-4
19	Oda Nobuna no Yabō Zenkokuban 19 (織田信奈の野望 全国版 19)	September 20, 2017	978-4-04-072306-8
20	Oda Nobuna no Yabō Zenkokuban 20 (織田信奈の野望 全国版 20)	February 20, 2018	978-4-04-072312-9
21	Oda Nobuna no Yabō Zenkokuban 21 (織田信奈の野望 全国版 21)	December 20, 2018	978-4-04-072763-9
22	Oda Nobuna no Yabō Zenkokuban 22 (織田信奈の野望 全国版 22)	June 20, 2019	978-4-04-072764-6

From volume 11, the light novel series have the postfix Zenkokuban ("全国版", Country-Wide Edition). This reflects that the story was expanding its coverage to include family affaires of daimyos across Japan, other than the Oda.

==== Revised volumes 1–10 ====
A revised version of volumes 1–10 was published in September 2015. The author and illustrator are the same as the original's. The title was changed to Oda Nobuna no Yabō Zenkokuban (織田信奈の野望 全国版) and the publisher was also changed to Kadokawa (Fujimi Fantasia Bunko imprint), which are the same as the original volumes 11–22. Before the publication of this revised edition, 13 volumes of the original story had already been published.

Only the first volume uses a different cover illustration from the original GA Bunko version. Volumes 2–10 add a new special short story at the end of each volume. These are "bonus" for readers, according to the author.

No.	Title	Japanese release date	Japanese ISBN
1	Oda Nobuna no Yabō Zenkokuban 1 (織田信奈の野望 全国版 1)	September 19, 2015	978-4-04-712949-8
2	Oda Nobuna no Yabō Zenkokuban 2 (織田信奈の野望 全国版 2)	September 19, 2015	978-4-04-712950-4
3	Oda Nobuna no Yabō Zenkokuban 3 (織田信奈の野望 全国版 3)	September 19, 2015	978-4-04-712951-1
4	Oda Nobuna no Yabō Zenkokuban 4 (織田信奈の野望 全国版 4)	September 19, 2015	978-4-04-070159-2
5	Oda Nobuna no Yabō Zenkokuban 5 (織田信奈の野望 全国版 5)	September 19, 2015	978-4-04-070154-7
6	Oda Nobuna no Yabō Zenkokuban 6 (織田信奈の野望 全国版 6)	September 19, 2015	978-4-04-070155-4
7	Oda Nobuna no Yabō Zenkokuban 7 (織田信奈の野望 全国版 7)	September 19, 2015	978-4-04-070157-8
8	Oda Nobuna no Yabō Zenkokuban 8 (織田信奈の野望 全国版 8)	September 19, 2015	978-4-04-070158-5
9	Oda Nobuna no Yabō Zenkokuban 9 (織田信奈の野望 全国版 9)	September 19, 2015	978-4-04-070156-1
10	Oda Nobuna no Yabō Zenkokuban 10 (織田信奈の野望 全国版 10)	September 19, 2015	978-4-04-070160-8

The author provides explanations about this revision in the afterword for each volume. According to the author's account, there were three reasons for the revision.

The first reason for revision was that the constraint of page count resulted in omitting important episodes from the original story. Since the constraint has been relaxed thanks to changes in publishing environment, the author attempted to include new episodes. The number of pages accordingly increased for each volume of the revised edition. New important episodes are, for example, the Battle of Inō in volume 1, the attack on Yoshiteru Ashikaga in volume 2, the extinguishing of the immortal lantern of Eizan (Mt. Hiei) in volume 4, and the operations of Sanada and Fuma ninja troops in volume 7.

The second reason for revision was the inconsistent taste of the story. The author evaluates the original story as lacking coherence, especially in volumes 6 and 7, because they were written under a bad mental condition caused by the shock of the 2011 Tōhoku earthquake and tsunami. These volumes show a significant change. The revision created totally different chapters related to the Nyankō-shū religion and the Honbyō Temple. The chapters about Nobuna and Yoshiharu's incognito visit to Odawara Castle were also completely rewritten.

The third reason was that the character settings had been changed through writing the spin-off story focusing the battles between the Takeda clan and the Uesugi clan, Ten to Chi to Hime to (see below). This experience renewed the author's imagination of the characteristics of Shingen Takeda after she lost her mentor Kansuke Yamamoto. This difference is reflected in the figure of Shingen appearing in volume 7.

==== Spin-off stories ====
The first spin-off story of The Ambition of Oda Nobuna focused on childhood of Masamune Date (Bontenmaru), titled Jakigan Ryū Masamune (邪気眼竜政宗), published in December 2012 by SB Creative (GA Bunko imprint). The author and the illustrator are the same as the original story's.

No.	Title	Japanese release date	Japanese ISBN
	Oda Nobuna no Yabō Gaiden: Jakigan Ryū Masamune (織田信奈の野望外伝 邪気眼竜政宗)	December 15, 2012	978-4-7973-7209-0

As well as the original story, this spin-off volume has a revised version published in September 2015 by Kadokawa (Fujimi Fantasia Bunko imprint).

No.	Title	Japanese release date	Japanese ISBN
	Oda Nobuna no Yabō Zenkokuban Gaiden: Jakigan Ryū Masamune (織田信奈の野望 全国版 外伝 邪気眼竜政宗)	September 19, 2015	978-4-04-070678-8

Another spin-off story featuring Shingen Takeda and Kenshin Uesugi, titled Ten to Chi to Hime to (天と地と姫と) had been serialized on the free novel website "Fantasia Beyond" by Fujimi Shobo since June 2014. It was published as a series of books from September 2016 to October 2017 (five volumes in totals). The author is Mikage Kasuga. Illustrator is Ryōsuke Fukai (深井涼介).

No.	Title	Japanese release date	Japanese ISBN
1	Ten to Chi to Hime to 1: Uesugi Kenshin Ryū no Tanjō (Oda Nobuna no Yabō Zenkokuban) (天と地と姫と1 上杉謙信 龍の誕生 (織田信奈の野望 全国版))	September 17, 2016	978-4-04-072002-9
2	Ten to Chi to Hime to 2: Takeda Shingen Tora no Kakusei (Oda Nobuna no Yabō Zenkokuban) (天と地と姫と2 武田信玄 虎の覚醒 (織田信奈の野望 全国版))	October 20, 2016	978-4-04-072003-6
3	Ten to Chi to Hime to 3: Kawanakajima Ryūko no Kaikō (Oda Nobuna no Yabō Zenkokuban) (天と地と姫と3 川中島 龍虎の邂逅 (織田信奈の野望 全国版))	February 18, 2017	978-4-04-072170-5
4	Ten to Chi to Hime to 4: Kawanakajima Ryū no Jōraku Nobuna no Jōraku (Oda Nobuna no Yabō Zenkokuban) (天と地と姫と4 川中島 龍の上洛 信奈の上洛 (織田信奈の野望 全国版))	June 20, 2017	978-4-04-072333-4
5	Ten to Chi to Hime to 5: Ryūsei Kōtei Kawanakajima no Densetsu (Oda Nobuna no Yabō Zenkokuban) (天と地と姫と5 流星光底 川中島の伝説 (織田信奈の野望 全国版))	October 20, 2017	978-4-04-072334-1

Spin-off short stories are compiled in a book series of three volumes titled Azuchi Nikki (安土日記). They were published in 2015 and 2018. The author and the illustrator are the same as the original story's.

No.	Title	Japanese release date	Japanese ISBN
1	Oda Nobuna no Yabō Azuchi Nikki 1: Honnōji Chakai Sōdōroku (織田信奈の野望 安土日記1 本能寺茶会騒動録)	September 19, 2015	978-4-04-070705-1
2	Oda Nobuna no Yabō Azuchi Nikki 2: Kobayakawa Takakage no Hatsukoi (織田信奈の野望 安土日記2 小早川隆景の初恋)	January 20, 2018	978-4-04-070897-3
3	Oda Nobuna no Yabō Azuchi Nikki 3: Kuishinbō Shōgun Imagawa Yoshimoto Manyūki (織田信奈の野望 安土日記3 食いしん坊将軍 今川義元漫遊記)	June 20, 2018	978-4-04-072765-3

After the original story completed in 2019, another special story was set in a modern Japanese high school, titled Oda Nobuna no Gakuen (織田信奈の学園), with the same author and illustrator as the original.

No.	Title	Japanese release date	Japanese ISBN
	Oda Nobuna no Gakuen (織田信奈の学園)	January 20, 2021	978-4-04-073885-7

The Editorial Department of Fantasia Bunko published an official character book in 2017, with illustrations by Miyama-zero and Ryosuke Fukai.

No.	Title	Japanese release date	Japanese ISBN
	Oda Nobuna no Yabō: Hime Bushō-roku (織田信奈の野望 姫武将録)	May 20, 2017	978-4-04-072309-9

=== Manga ===
A manga adaptation written by Mikage Kasuga and illustrated by Shigure Aoba was serialized in Kadokawa Shoten's Comp Ace magazine from July 2011 to June 2014 and the serial chapters were collected into 6 volumes. The first volume was released in February 2012 and the last volume was released in August 2014.

Another spin-off manga series in two volumes, written by Mikage Kasuga and illustrated by Futago Minazuki, was published by Fujimi Shobo in 2012.

=== Anime ===
An anime television series adaptation animated by Madhouse and Studio Gokumi based on volumes 1 to 4 of the novels aired from July 9 to September 24, 2012, on TV Tokyo. The anime is directed by Yūji Kumazawa, scripted by Masami Suzuki, and composed by Yasuharu Takanashi.

The opening theme song is "Link" by Aimi and the closing theme song is "Hikari" (ヒカリ; "Light") by Makino Mizuta.
