= Miki Castle =

Castle in Hyōgo, Japan

- 三木城
- Aioi, Hyōgo Prefecture, Japan
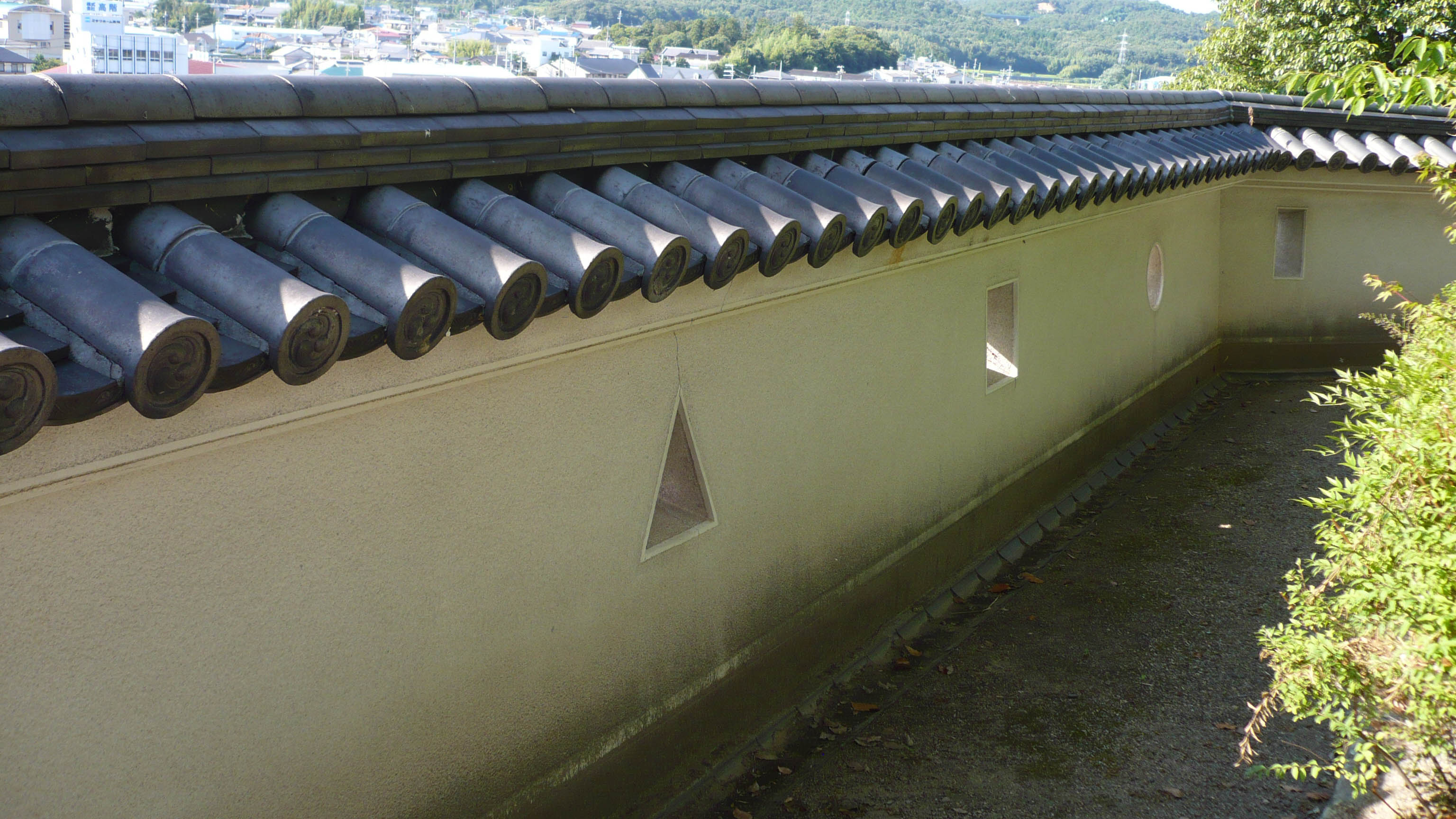
- Miki Castle reconstructed stone wall

Site information
- Type: Yamajiro-style castle
- Owner: Bessho clan
- Condition: ruins

Location
- Miki Castle
- Location within Hyōgo Prefecture Location within Japan
- Coordinates: 34.7999°N 134.9880°E

Site history
- Built: 1492
- Built by: Bessho Nagaharu
- Demolished: 1616
- Battles/wars: Siege of Miki

Garrison information
- Past commanders: Bessho Nagaharu

Miki Castle (三木城,, Miki-jō) was a Japanese castle in Miki, Hyōgo Prefecture, Japan. It was built by Bessho Nagaharu in the Sengoku period. Today some ruins and a partial reconstruction remain at the castle site, and its ruins have been protected as a National Historic Site, since 2013.

== Overview ==
Miki Castle was located on a steep cliff facing the Minogawa River, a tributary of Kakogawa River, in the center of Miki city. This area was the center of eastern half of Harima Province and is separated from Kobe by the Rokko Mountains. Because of the flow of traffic and commerce made possible by the river and roads, Miki city considered as an important transportation hub and center of industry at that time. The castle was almost entirely surrounded by natural barriers such as mountains, valleys and cliffs, so only a portion to the southeast of the castle was exposed.

A fortification was first built in this location by Bessho Nagaharu in around 1492 to be the main stronghold of the clan. The Bessho were a cadet branch of the powerful Akamatsu clan, and controlled parts of Settsu and Harima on behalf of the Akamatsu. However the Akamatsu became a political threat to the Muromachi shogunate and Shogun Ashikaga Yoshinori attempted to deprive the clan of much of its territory to increase his own authority. Akamatsu Mitsusuke assassinated Ashikaga Yoshinori at a banquet in Kyoto, but his revolt was ultimately unsuccessful and the clan lost much of its territory. During the Ōnin War, as much of the former Akamatsu territory was given to the Yamana clan, but after much conflict the Akamatsu were able to retake Harima, and appointed Bessho clan as their deputy governor for the eastern half of Harima. However, the much weakened Akamatsu, facing further threaten from the west and north, and riven by internal discord, were unable to maintain control over the Bessho clan, who soon emerged as an independent power in the region. Another former Akamatsu retainer, the Uragami clan, likewise became a power in western Harima, and attacked Miki Castle in 1530, temporarily expelling Bessho Nariharu (the grandson of Bessho Nagaharu). Later that year, Bessho Nariharu successfully fended off attacks from the Amago clan from the north. Around 1550, the Bessho faced a new threat from the east. The Miyoshi clan, who had grown dominate the Kinai region invaded Harima. Outnumbered, Bessho Nariharu was forced to submit, but after the death of Miyoshi Nagayoshi, the clan was weakened and the Bessho regained their independence. During this time, Miki Castle was greatly expanded in size, growing to cover an area of 500 square meters.

In 1577, Oda Nobunaga began his campaign to conquer western Japan and appointed Hashiba Hideyoshi as his regional commander. Hideyoshi quickly united Harima with the support of Bessho Nagaharu, the grandson of Bessho Nariharu. However, in March 1578, Bessho clan suddenly revolted for unknown reasons, resulting in the Siege of Miki.

=== The Siege of Miki Castle ===
Miki Castle was the scene of a siege from spring 1578 to January 1580, in which Toyotomi Hideyoshi laid siege to the castle, cutting off food supplies to Bessho Nagaharu, Hideyoshi had a difficult time, as the Bessho allied with the powerful Mōri clan to the west, and Hideyoshi's army was not very strong. He soon found himself caught in a pincer in which the attacked his stronghold at Kouzuki Castle from the west, while the Bessho were threatening from the rear. Hideyoshi decided to abandon Kouzuki and concentrate his forces against Miki Castle. To make matters worse, his general Araki Murashige, lord of Itami Castle revolved in October 1578. It was only after the defeat of the Mōri navy at the Naval Battle of Kizugawa River in November 1578 that the supply lines to the castle were decisively cut, and the defection of the Ukita clan in Bizen Province from the Mōri to Hideyoshi in October 1579 that all possibly of outside relief of Miki Castle was lost.

After the death of Nagaharu Miki Castle was kept as a local stronghold of this area, and finally abolished in 1616 per the "One Castle Per Province" (一国一城,, Ikkoku-ichijō) order established by the Tokugawa Shogunate.

The site of the main keep of Miki-jō was converted into Uenomaru Park in 1897 during the Meiji period. In the park, there is a city museum and library.

== Recent activity ==
Since Taiga drama “Gunshi Kanbe” aired in 2014, visits to the Miki castle ruins and surrounding area have increased. The drama follows the life of the Sengoku period general Kuroda Yoshitaka in Himeji and Miki. The people and local government of Miki city capitalized on the popularity of the drama by advertising the castle ruins and selling souvenir goods to draw people to the city's historic sites. That year, Miki city volunteers began offering tours of the sites of the Siege of Miki, which included the castle ruins, reconstructed outer-wall, and period buildings around the castle site.

During the Siege of Miki, Toyotomi Hideyoshi built earthwork fortifications around Miki-jō, which remain to this day, and were designated a National Historic Site by the Japanese government in 2013.

== Access ==
=== By train ===
From Kobe

From Shin-Kobe Station or Sannomiya Station, take the Seishin-Yamate Line subway to Minatogawa-Kōen Station, change to the Shintetsu Arima Line for Suzurandai Station, at Suzurandai take the Shintetsu Ao Line to Miki Uenomaru Station - from there it's a five-minute walk to the Miki Castle ruins.

Shin-Kobe Station is accessible on the Shinkansen from Tokyo, and Sannomiya Station is accessible on the San'yō Main Line from Osaka Station.

=== By bus ===
From Kobe

The Miki Castle ruins are accessible by Kamihime Nishiwaki Express bus from Sannomiya bus terminal at Sannomiya Station. The Uenomaru bus stop is a ten-minute walk from the castle ruins.

=== By car ===
From Miki

From the Miki-Ono IC tollgate of the San'yō Expressway, the Miki Castle ruins are accessible from National Highway 175 and Hyōgo Prefectural Road 20. Uenomaru Park, the site of the main keep of Miki Castle, has a free parking area.

== See also ==
- List of Historic Sites of Japan (Hyōgo)
