= Inano Shrine =

Shinto shrine in Itami, Hyogo, Japan

Inano Shrine 猪名野神社
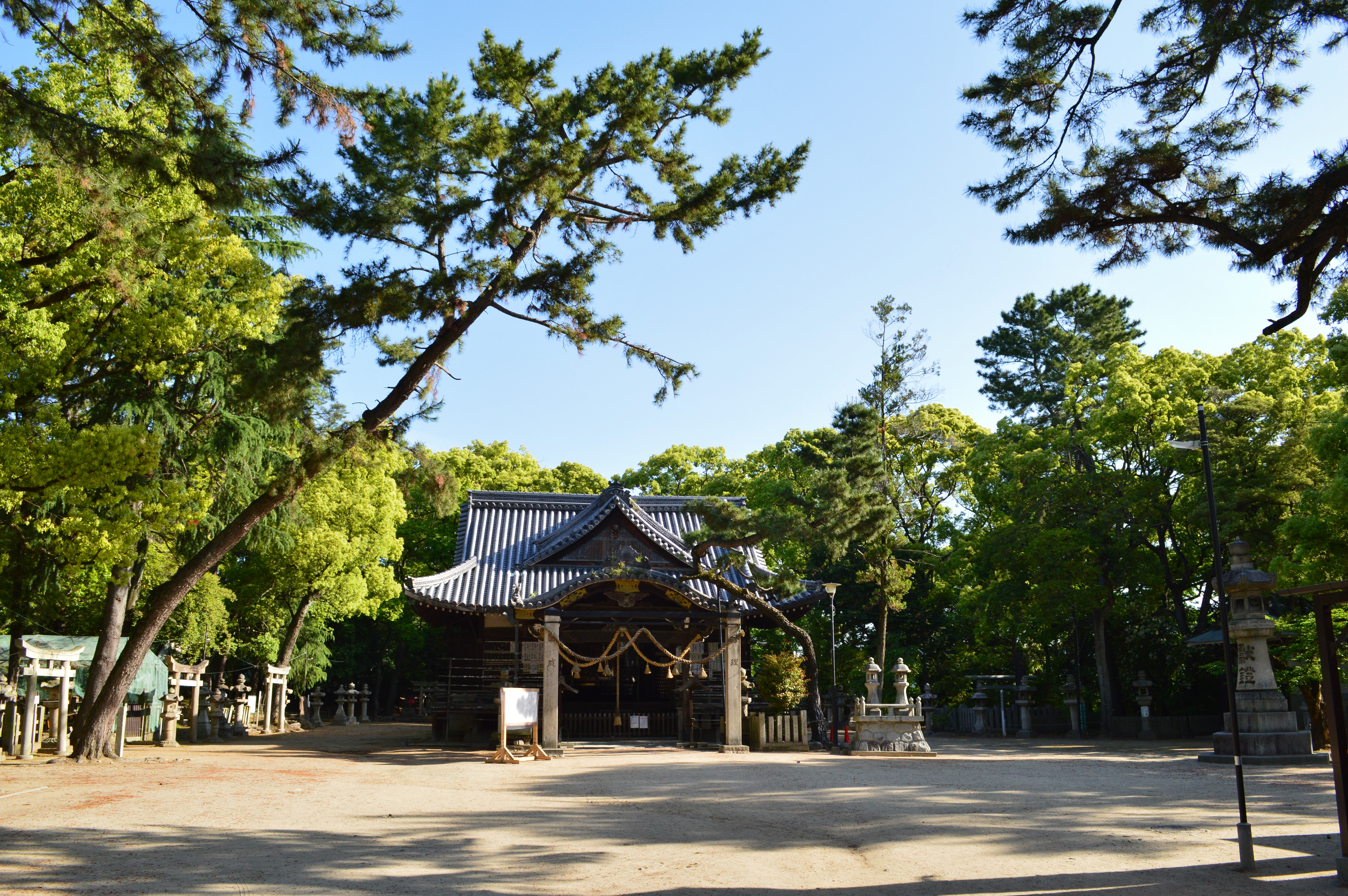
- Inano Shrine precincts

- Location within Hyōgo Prefecture Location within Japan

Religion
- Affiliation: Shinto
- Deity: Inanoza Ōkami; Susanoo
- Festival: April 23, June 30, July 16, October 13-14

Location
- Location: Miyanomae, Itami-shi, Hyōgo-ken
- Interactive map of Inano Shrine 猪名野神社
- Coordinates: 34°47′07″N 135°24′55″E

Architecture
- Style: Kasuga-zukuri
- Established: c.645–654

Inano Shrine (猪名野神社, Inano jinja) is a Shinto shrine located in the Miyamae neighborhood of the city of Itami, Hyogo Prefecture, Japan. The shrine grounds are designated as a national historic site as part of the ruins of Sengoku period Itami Castle.

== History ==
According to legend, the shrine was built in Inadera (currently Inadera, Amagasaki) during the time of Emperor Kōtoku (645–654, during the Asuka period) and was relocated to the present location in 904. In ancient times, the shrine was called "Nonomiya", "Tennomiya", "Ushito Tennomiya", and other names. In 1574, Araki Murashige rebuilt Itami Castle as a Sogamae (総構え) type of fortification in which the entire castle town forms part of the defenses by being completely encircled by moats and earthen ramparts, and with the arrangement of streets and townhouses planned as part of the defensive belt. Inano Shrine fell within the northernmost fortress of the outer defenses, and a bastion, the Kishi-no-toride (岸の砦) was constructed on the location of the shrine. It was destroyed by the forces of Oda Nobunaga in Siege of Itami (1579). In 1661, the Itami area became the territory of the Konoe family, and in 1685 Konoe Motohiro rebuilt the shrine.The current Honden of the shrine was completed in 1686.

Due to the shinbutsu bunri policy (separation of Shinto and Buddhism) in 1869, Kannon-do, Jizo-do and Buddhist-related records were moved to Kōngo-in, and the name of the shrine was changed from Nonomiya to its present name, Inano Shrine. The shrine was ranked as a Prefectural Shrine in modern system of ranked Shinto Shrines. As such it follows the tradition of the Gion faith.

There are 98 stone lanterns donated by sake brewers and merchants on the shrine grounds. The oldest one was made in 1643, and the guardian dog pedestal was built in 1768.

== See also ==
- List of Historic Sites of Japan (Hyōgo)
- Itami Castle
