= Siege of Itami =

Siege of Itami may refer to:

- Siege of Itami (1574)
- Siege of Itami (1579)
