= Tsuda Nobuzumi =

Japanese samurai (1555–1582)

- 津田 信澄
- Born: 1555; Owari Province
- Died: June 24, 1582 (aged 26–27)
- Children: Oda Masazumi
- Relatives: Oda Nobuyuki (father); Oda Nobunaga (uncle); Akechi Mitsuhide (father in law)
- Military career
- Allegiance: Oda clan
- Conflicts: Siege of Itami (1579); Tenshō Iga War (1581)

Tsuda Nobuzumi (津田 信澄; 1555 – June 24, 1582) was a Japanese samurai and member of the main Oda clan of Owari Province during the Sengoku and Azuchi–Momoyama periods. He was the son of Oda Nobuyuki and nephew of Oda Nobunaga.

In 1578, Nobuzumi built Omizo Castle on the shore of Lake Biwa, across from Azuchi Castle, built by his uncle Nobunaga.

In 1579 Nobuzumi led a requisition unit into the inner citadel of Arioka castle, drawing to an end the Siege of Itami against Araki Murashige.

In 1581, at the second Tenshō Iga War, he and Oda Nobukatsu led 10,000 men entering Iga province from Ise (Aoyama Pass) to the southeast.

After the Incident at Honnō-ji in 1582 Nobuzumi was suspected by Oda Nobutaka of collaboration with Akechi Mitsuhide, largely because of his marriage with Mitsuhide's daughter. Due to this guilt by association, Nobutaka had Nobuzumi killed.

== Family ==
- Father: Oda Nobuyuki (1536–1557)
- Son: Oda Masazumi (1579–1641)
- Brother: Tsuda Nobutada (1555-1631)
