= Bessho Nagaharu =

Japanese daimyō (1558–1580)

- 別所長治
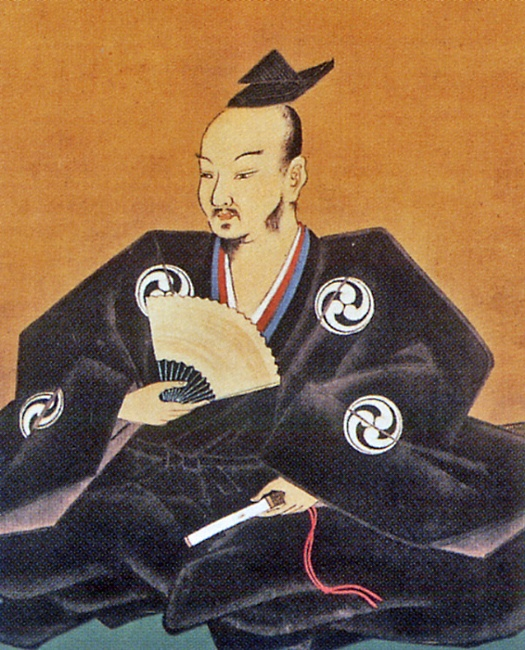
- Bessho Nagaharu portrait in Hyōgo Prefectural Museum of Art.
- Died: 2 February 1580 (aged 21–22)
- Cause of death: Seppuku
- Title: Daimyō of Harima province

Bessho Nagaharu (別所 長治; 1558 – February 2, 1580) was a Japanese daimyō of the Sengoku period. He was the eldest son of Bessho Yasuharu.

In 1578 Oda Nobunaga called on his retainers to attack the Mōri clan. Nagaharu almost decided to ally with the Oda clan, but after hearing that the low-born general Hashiba Hideyoshi, whom he did not respect, was leading the troops, he revolted and instead allied himself with Hatano Hideharu of Tanba province.

Nagaharu took a stand at Miki Castle, and was besieged by Hideyoshi's troops on the orders of Nobunaga. The Siege of Miki did not go well for Hideyoshi, and with a revolt by Araki Murashige and the help of the Mōri clan, Nagaharu successfully repelled the Oda force.

In 1579, Hideyoshi returned and instead of launching a direct assault, he launched multiple sieges against smaller castles like Kamiyoshi Castle and Sigata Castle to cut off the support from Mōri. This led to a rapid depletion of food, and in 1580, with no hope of another reinforcement from Mōri clan, Nagaharu committed seppuku in exchange for the lives of the troops in Miki Castle.

== Related Pages ==
- Miki Castle
