= Siege of Miki =

1578 siege

- Part of the Sengoku period
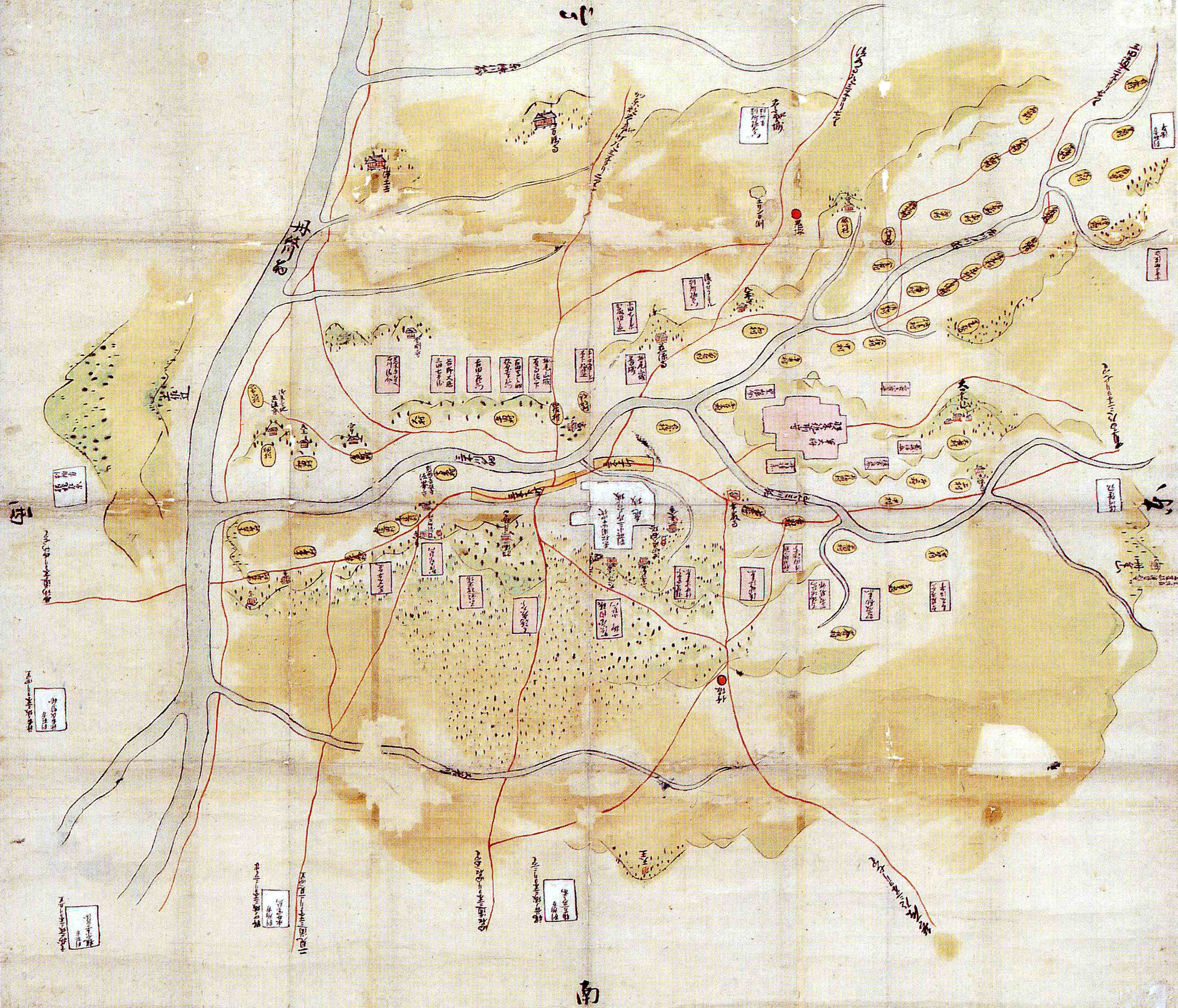
- The encirclement of Miki by Hashiba Hideyoshi
Date	1578–1580
Location	Miki, Harima Province 34°48′00″N 134°59′16″E
Result	Toyotomi victory
Territorial changes	Castle of Miki fall to Oda clan

Belligerents
Forces of Oda Nobunaga	Forces of Bessho Nagaharu

Commanders and leaders
Hashiba Hideyoshi; Hachisuka Koroku; Takenaka Hanbei; Kuroda Kanbei; Araki Murashige; Fukushima Masanori; Otani Yoshitsugu; Wakisaka Yasuharu	Bessho Nagaharu †; Bessho Harusada †; Bessho Yoshicika (executed)
- Location within Hyōgo Prefecture Siege of Miki (Japan)

The siege of Miki (三木合戦) lasted from 1578 to 1580. Toyotomi Hideyoshi took Miki Castle of Harima Province, located in what is now Miki, Hyōgo, Japan, from Bessho Nagaharu, an ally of the Mōri clan.

== Situation in Harima ==
The original Shugo (governor) of the Harima province was the Akamatsu clan, with the Bessho clan and Kodera clan as Shugodai (deputy governor).

The Akamatsu clan were one of the most powerful Shugo of the previous Shogunate, having at one point being the Shugo of four separate provinces. However, by this time they had already greatly decreased in power and only nominal leaders were banding together to form a coalition of the collapsing clans in Harima.

When Hashiba Hideyoshi entered the province on the order of Oda Nobunaga in late 1576, the Akamatsu clan leader Akamatsu Norifusa decided to simply surrender to the Oda, while he still had a decent deal on the Harima coalition. Soon after the Bessho clan and Kodera clan also submitted.

== Bessho rebellion ==
Having apparently taken all of Harima without bloodshed, Hideyoshi proceeded to move his base of operations to Himeji, the former residential castle of the Akamatsu, and began preparing for a showdown with the Mōri clan.

However, during this time, Bessho Nagaharu's uncle, Bessho Yoshichika, was reported to have felt insulted over having to submit to Hideyoshi, who was born a commoner. He managed to convince his nephew to rebel, and also set up a secret alliance with the Mori clan. Soon, after his rebellion, the Kodera clan joined in.

Once the first shot was fired, Hideyoshi was suddenly in a dangerous position, trapped between the powerful Mori clan in the front and rebelling clans behind him.

Later, Hideyoshi decided to lay siege to Miki castle, hoping to destroy the source of the rebellion.

== Siege ==
In 1578, Hideyoshi's force gradually took out the Bessho clan's outlying castles and eventually surrounded them in Miki Castle.

However, the Bessho held out for an extraordinarily long time, at first due to a large stock of food, and then secret resupply missions by the Mori navy, though these ended long before the siege would. They attempted to break the siege on a few occasions. During one of these attacks on the much larger Oda forces, Bessho Harusada, the younger brother of Nagaharu, was killed. After nearly three years since the beginning of the rebellion, Miki castle finally surrendered. Bessho Nagaharu committed seppuku and his uncle Bessho Yoshichika, the instigator of this rebellion, was killed by his own soldiers.

In the meantime, during the siege, Araki Murashige suddenly left the battle front and returned to his home base at Arioka Castle (also known as Itami Castle). This was a rebellion against Oda Nobunaga. The reason for his rebellion may have owed to Nobunaga's severe attitude toward his subordinates. Later, Nobunaga launched the Siege of Itami (1579) against Murashige.
