= Siege of Itami (1574) =

1574 siege

- Part of the Sengoku period
Date	1574
Location	Itami Castle 34°46′53″N 135°25′15″E
Result	Oda Nobunaga victory

Belligerents
forces of Oda Nobunaga	Itami clan garrison

Commanders and leaders
Araki Murashige; Hashiba Hideyoshi	Itami Chikaoki
- Location within Hyōgo Prefecture Siege of Itami (1574) (Japan)

The 1574 siege of Itami (伊丹の戦い, Itami no Tatakai) was the first time Itami Castle would be attacked.

== History ==
Oda Nobunaga forces under Araki Murashige besieged the castle. In the meantime during the siege, Hashiba Hideyoshi attacked the castle by digging a long tunnel from outside the walls to a spot near the castle's keep.

After the castle fell, Nobunaga gave the castle to Araki Murashige. Murashige expanded the castle, and it became one of the biggest castles in this region.

Later, after the Araki Murashige rebellion, this castle was captured by Oda Nobunaga again at the siege of Itami (1579). It was later abolished by Ikeda Motosuke, a major general under Oda Nobunaga.

== See also ==
- Siege of Itami (1579)
