= Justo Takayama =

Japanese Daimyō and Blessed

Blessed Justo Takayama Ukon ジュスト高山右近
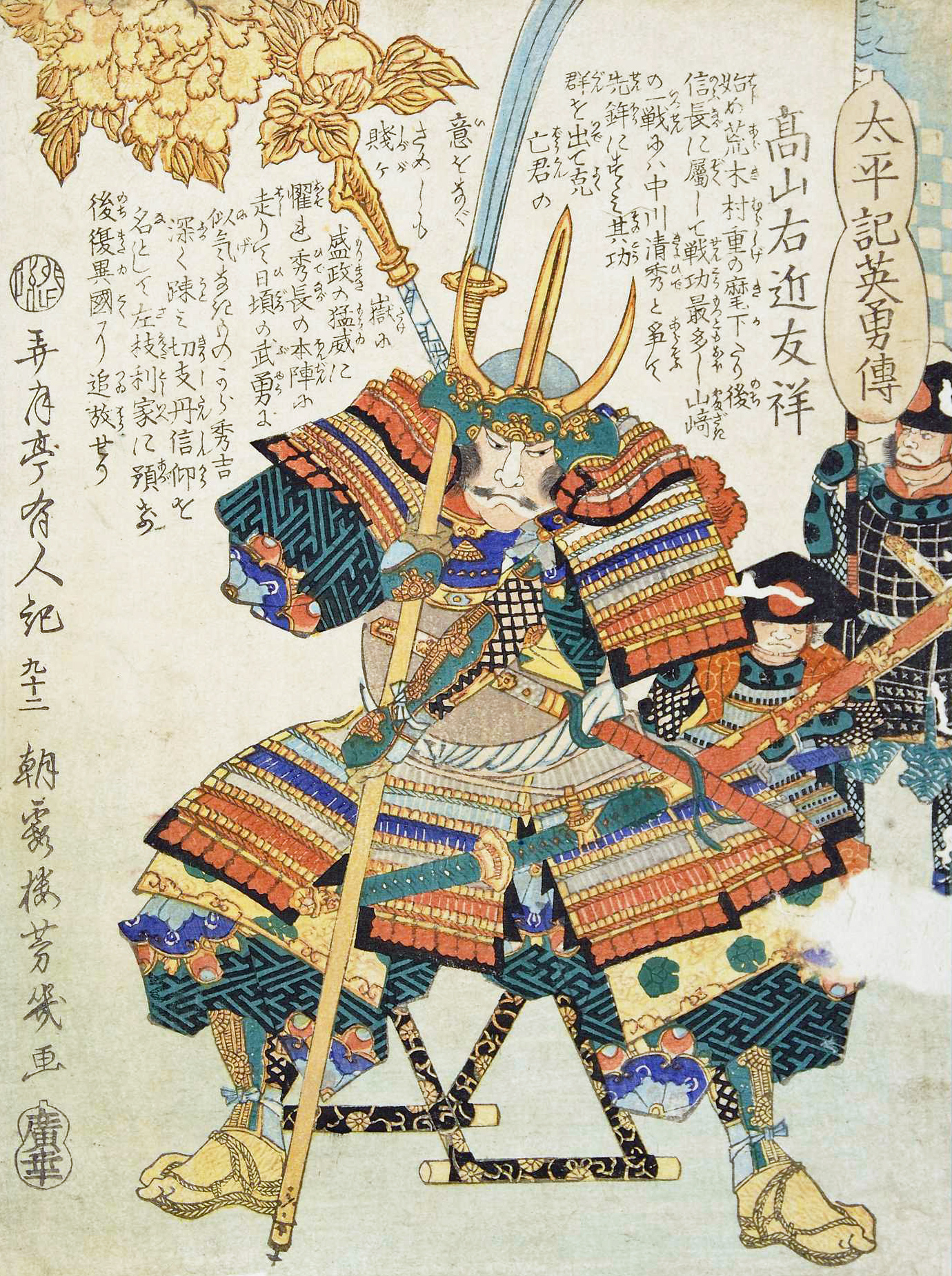
- Meiji Era Stylized Illustration of Justo Takayama in WoodBlock Print by Utagawa Yoshiiku

Martyr
- Born: Takayama Hikogorō c. 1552; Haibara, Nara, Sengoku Period, Ashikaga Shogunate
- Died: 3 or 5 February 1615 (aged 62–63); Manila, Captaincy General of the Philippines, Viceroyalty of New Spain
- Venerated in: Catholic Church
- Beatified: 7 February 2017, Osaka-jō Hall, Osaka, Japan by Cardinal Angelo Amato (on behalf of Pope Francis)
- Major shrine: Manila Cathedral, Intramuros, Manila, Philippines
- Feast: 3 February
- Attributes: Sword, crucifix, samurai robes, martyr's palm

Justo Takayama Ukon (ジュスト高山右近), born Takayama Hikogorō (高山彦五郎) and also known as Dom Justo Takayama (c. 1552/1553 - 5 February 1615) was a Japanese Catholic daimyō and samurai during the Sengoku period that saw rampant anti-Catholic sentiment.

Takayama was baptized into the Catholic Church in 1564 when he was twelve, though he later became disenfranchised from his religion due to his actions as a samurai. He eventually renewed his faith after a coming-of-age ritual near the age of 20. He renounced his samurai status to devote himself to Christianity and was exiled to Manila in 1614, where he lived until his death two months later.

At the beginning of his beatification process he was declared a Servant of God. Pope Francis beatified him on 21 January 2016; the celebration was held on 7 February 2017 in Osaka with Cardinal Angelo Amato presiding on the pope's behalf.

== Biography ==
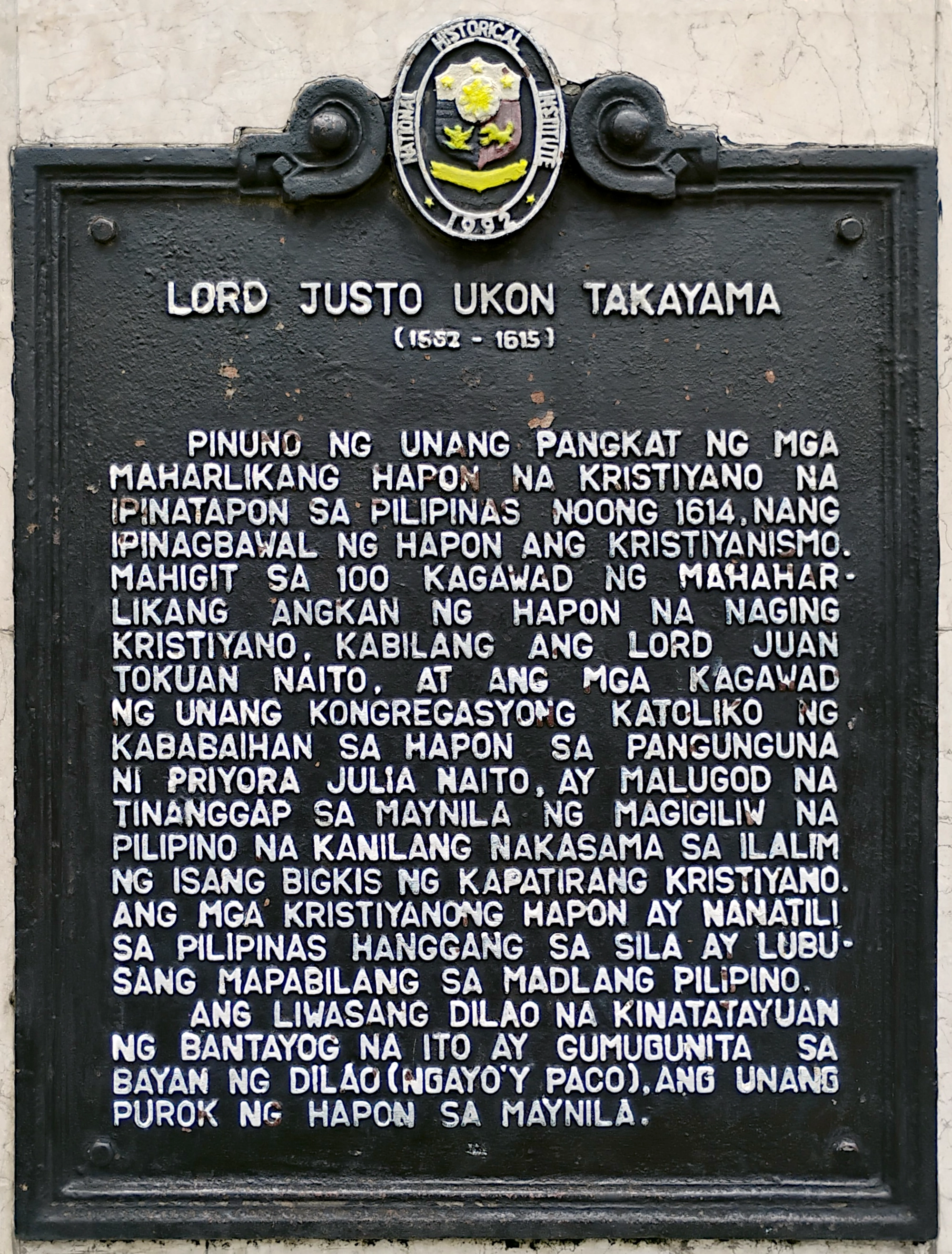
National historical marker for Takayama installed in 1992 at Plaza Dilao, Paco, Manila

Dom Justo Takayama was the eldest son (thus the heir) of Takayama Tomoteru who was the lord of the Sawa Castle in the Yamato Province. His childhood name was Hikogorō (彦五郎).

In 1564, his father converted to Roman Catholicism after meeting with Portuguese missionaries. Hikogorō was baptized as Justo (Latin: Iustus; Japanese: ジュスト or ユスト, based on Portuguese or Latin pronunciation). After his coming-of-age celebration his name was changed to Shigetomo (重友). However he is better known as Takayama Ukon (高山右近), "Ukon" being a title. Portuguese and Spanish Europeans also referred to him as Dom/Don Justo "Ucondono" (from 右近殿, Ukon-dono).

In 1571, he fought in an important and successful battle as part of his coming-of-age ritual which culminated in a duel to the death with a compatriot whom he killed; however, Takayama received grievous wounds in the process and during his convalescence realized he had cared little about Catholicism.

He married in 1574 and went on to have three sons (two died as infants) and one daughter. Justo and his father fought through the turbulent age to secure their position as a daimyō. He managed to acquire Takatsuki Castle (in Takatsuki, Osaka) and participated in the Ishiyama Hongan-ji War (1570-1580) under the warlord Oda Nobunaga. He also fought under the daimyō Toyotomi Hideyoshi during his rule's earlier times, participating in the Battle of Yamazaki (1582), Battle of Shizugatake (1583) and Siege of Kagoshima (1587).

During their domination of Takatsuki region, he and his father pushed their policies as kirishitan daimyōs. Several of their subjects converted to Catholicism under their influence. During his reign, Takayama destroyed numerous Buddhist temples and Shinto shrines in both Takatsuki and Akashi.

However, Hideyoshi became hostile towards the Christian faith and in 1587 ordered the expulsion of all missionaries and that all Christian daimyōs should renounce their faith. While several daimyō obeyed this order and renounced Roman Catholicism, Justo proclaimed that he would not give up his faith and would rather give up his land and all that he owned.

Takayama lived under the protection of Maeda Toshiie until 1614 when Tokugawa Ieyasu (the ruler at the time) prohibited the Christian faith which resulted in Takayama's expulsion from Japan. On 8 November 1614, with 300 other Japanese Christians, he left his home from Nagasaki. He arrived at Manila on 11 December 1614 where he received a warm welcome from the Spanish Jesuits and the local Filipinos.

The governor Juan de Silva wished to provide him with an income to support him and his relations but he declined this offer saying he was no longer in a position to offer his services in exchange for income nor did he wish to act like a lord.

Some in the colonial government of the Spanish Philippines suggested to invade Japan and overthrow Tokugawa in order to protect Japanese Christians and place him in a position of great power and influence. Takayama declined to participate and even opposed the plan.

== Death ==
Jesuit illustration of Justo Takayama

After suffering from a violent fever, he died of illness at midnight on 3 or 5 February 1615, 44 days after arriving in Manila. The Spanish government gave him a Christian funeral with full military honors, as befitting his status as a daimyō, and buried him in the San Ignacio Church inside Intramuros, Manila.

In December 1945 after the Battle of Manila during the Second World War, his relics were hastily mixed with those of others recovered from the ruins of San Ignacio, and translated to the Society’s Sacred Heart Novitiate in Novaliches, Quezon City. The containers of known and unknown remains, including those of Takayama, were interred in two niches, making him the only daimyō buried on Philippine soil. DNA testing has yet to identify all of his bones.

== Memorials ==
At Plaza Dilao in Paco, Manila, a statue of Takayama was installed in 1978. The site is the last vestige of the old town where some 3,000 Japanese immigrants lived in exile. The statue of Takayama depicts him in traditional samurai garb and a topknot. He is holding a sheathed katana pointed downwards, upon which hangs a crucifix.

The University of Santo Tomas has a copy of the Plaza Dilao statue in front of the Thomas Aquinas Research Complex building. It was unveiled and blessed on 28 March 2017.

On 21 December 2022, a resin image of Takayama was enshrined inside the San Miguel Church in Manila.

== Beatification ==
His cause for sainthood started at a diocesan level which resulted in the validation of the process on 10 June 1994 after the Congregation for the Causes of Saints (CCS) were given all the boxes of documentation pertaining to the cause. The commencement to the cause saw him titled as a Servant of God. There had been failed attempts to start the cause in the past. The first attempt came in 1630 when the Manila priests decided to commence it, but this failed due to the isolationist Japanese policies which prevented the collection of the documentation that was needed; the petition was presented but was rejected. The second attempt in 1965 failed due to several errors being made. In October 2012, a letter was presented to Pope Benedict XVI asking for the cause to be re-examined. The positio dossier was submitted in 2013 to the competent authorities in Rome for further assessment. Takayama's cause was meant to confirm that he was a martyr because of the treatment he received and because he renounced all he had to pursue and profess his faith.

Historical consultants met to discuss the cause on 10 December 2013, and the theologians met on 20 May 2014 to discuss and vote on the cause. The cardinals and bishop members of the CCS met on 18 June 2015 to make a final decision on the cause before it could go to Pope Francis for his approval, and they had to meet again on 12 January 2016. Pope Francis approved Takayama's beatification on 21 January 2016; it was celebrated in Osaka on 7 February 2017 with Cardinal Amato presiding on the pope's behalf.

During Cardinal Thomas Aquino Manyo Maeda's visit to the Manila Cathedral on 21 December 2023, the cardinal disclosed investigations of possible miracles that would lead to Takayama's canonization.

== See also ==
- Naitō Julia
- Persecution of Christians in Japan
- 26 Martyrs of Japan
- History of the Catholic Church in Japan
- Caius of Korea
