= Takayama Tomoteru =

Japanese samurai

Takayama Tomoteru (高山友照) (1531–1596) was a Japanese samurai of the Azuchi–Momoyama period, and he served Matsunaga Hisahide.

He was the father of Takayama Ukon and was a Kirishitan.
