= Siege of Itami (1579) =

1579 siege in Japan

- Part of the Sengoku period
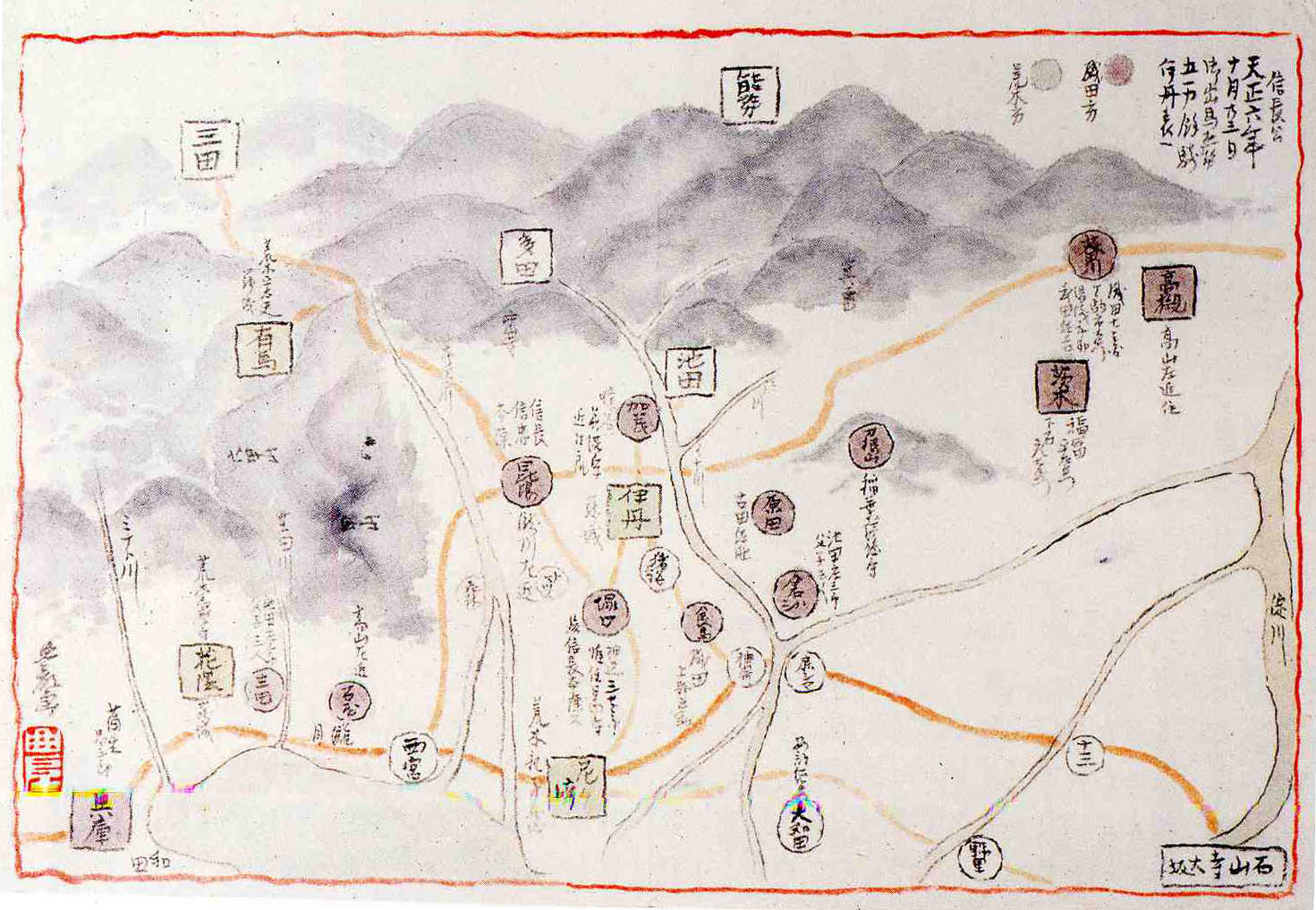
- The placement of Araki forces around Itami, drawn in 1865, now housed in the Itami Prefectural Museum
Date	1579
Location	Itami castle, Settsu Province 34°46′48″N 135°25′17″E
Result	Siege succeeds

Belligerents
forces of Oda Nobunaga	forces of Araki Murashige

Commanders and leaders
Oda Nobutada; Oda Nagamasu; Takigawa Kazumasu; Andō Morinari; Tsuda Nobuzumi; Hachiya Yoritaka; Tsutsui Junkei; Fuwa Mitsuharu	Araki Murashige; Araki Kyūzaemon

Casualties and losses
Unknown	670 people (Araki family and retainers)
- Location within Hyōgo Prefecture Siege of Itami (1579) (Japan)

The second siege of Itami Castle (伊丹城の戦い), also called the siege of Arioka Castle (有岡城の戦い) during the Sengoku period of Japanese history, occurred in 1579, five years after it was seized by Oda Nobunaga in Siege of Itami (1574) from the Itami clan, and entrusted the Castle to Araki Murashige.

== Background ==
In October of 1578, during the siege of Miki, Araki Murashige suddenly left the battlefront, returned to his home base at Arioka Castle (also known as Itami Castle), and launched a rebellion against the Oda clan. Then, Kuroda Yoshitaka went to Arioka castle to prevail on Murashige not to defect, but Murashige chose to imprison Yoshitaka instead.

Later, Nobunaga accused Murashige of sympathizing with the Mōri clan, enemies of Nobunaga. Araki shut himself in his castle and withstood siege by the armies of Oda Nobutada.

== Siege ==
Throughout the entirety of the siege, though Murashige's defense was able to hold out, his men did not sally forth from the castle or otherwise attack the besieging army. Murashige expected reinforcements from the Mōri or Ishiyama-Honganji armies, but neither arrived, making the castle's fall inevitable. In August of 1579, Araki Murashige slipped through Nobunaga's forces, escaping to Amagasaki Castle.

On October 15, 1579, Murashige's lieutenant Nakanishi Shinipachirō betrayed Murashige, defecting to Nobunaga's side and allowing troops led by Takigawa Kazumasu into the fort of Jōrōzuka, about half a kilometer southwest of Itami Castle. Defenders of the fort fled toward Itami Castle, though many were killed. In a coup de main, Takikawa took control of Itami and captured then razed the town's samurai headquarters.

Itami Castle was retaken by Nobunaga's forces and Kuroda Yoshitaka was rescued.

From all sides, Nobunaga's forces pushed closer and closer to Itami Castle, using siege towers and sappers. Pummeled by the attacks, the defenders pleaded for mercy. "Spare our lives," they begged, but Nobunaga refused to pardon them.

== Aftermath ==
In November of 1579, after Arioka Castle fell back into Nobunaga's control, "Araki Kyūzaemon and other leading figures" of Itami travelled to Amagasaki in an attempt to persuade Murashige to hand over control of Amagasaki and Hanakuma Castles to Nobunaga. On the condition that these castles were relinquished, Nobunaga agreed to spare the lives of the women and children of Itami Castle, who were being held as political hostages.

Meanwhile, in Itami Castle, three men, whose names were Suita, Hōkabe, and Ikeda Izumi, had been left behind to protect the womenfolk. Could Ikeda have had a premonition of what awaited those inside the castle? In any event, he composed the poem:

Though I shall vanish
Like a single drop of dew,
My thoughts will linger
With the poor little children.
What on earth will be their end?

When he was done, he loaded his gun and killed himself by blowing his head to smithereens. Slowly but surely, the women lost all hope, waiting as they did for a messenger from Amagasaki who never came. No words could describe their despair.

Finally, Araki Murashige refused to hand over Amagasaki and Hanakuma castles. Nobunaga, "intent on punishing them as renegades," decided that Araki's kin (33 women and 3 men) would be taken to Kyoto, paraded through the city, then beheaded. 122 women and children of Itami Castle were executed at Nanatsumatsu, near Amagasaki:

Making mothers hold on to their children, the soldiers affixed the women to crosses one after the other and then shot them point-blank with harquebuses or stabbed them to death with spears and halberds. As the hundred and twenty-two women were being slaughtered, their dying scream ripped through the sky in one massive burst. The eyes of those present dimmed and their hearts sank; they could not suppress their tears. They say that for twenty or thirty days, eyewitnesses were haunted by the victim's visages, unable to forget them.

An additional "388 females, the wives and children of low-ranking retainers and their maids" along with "124 males, from junior personnel assigned to the important ladies on down" were forced into four houses, which were set on fire.

A total of 670 persons were executed. Araki Murashige lived the rest of his life in obscurity.
