= Araki Murashige =

Daimyō

- 荒木 村重
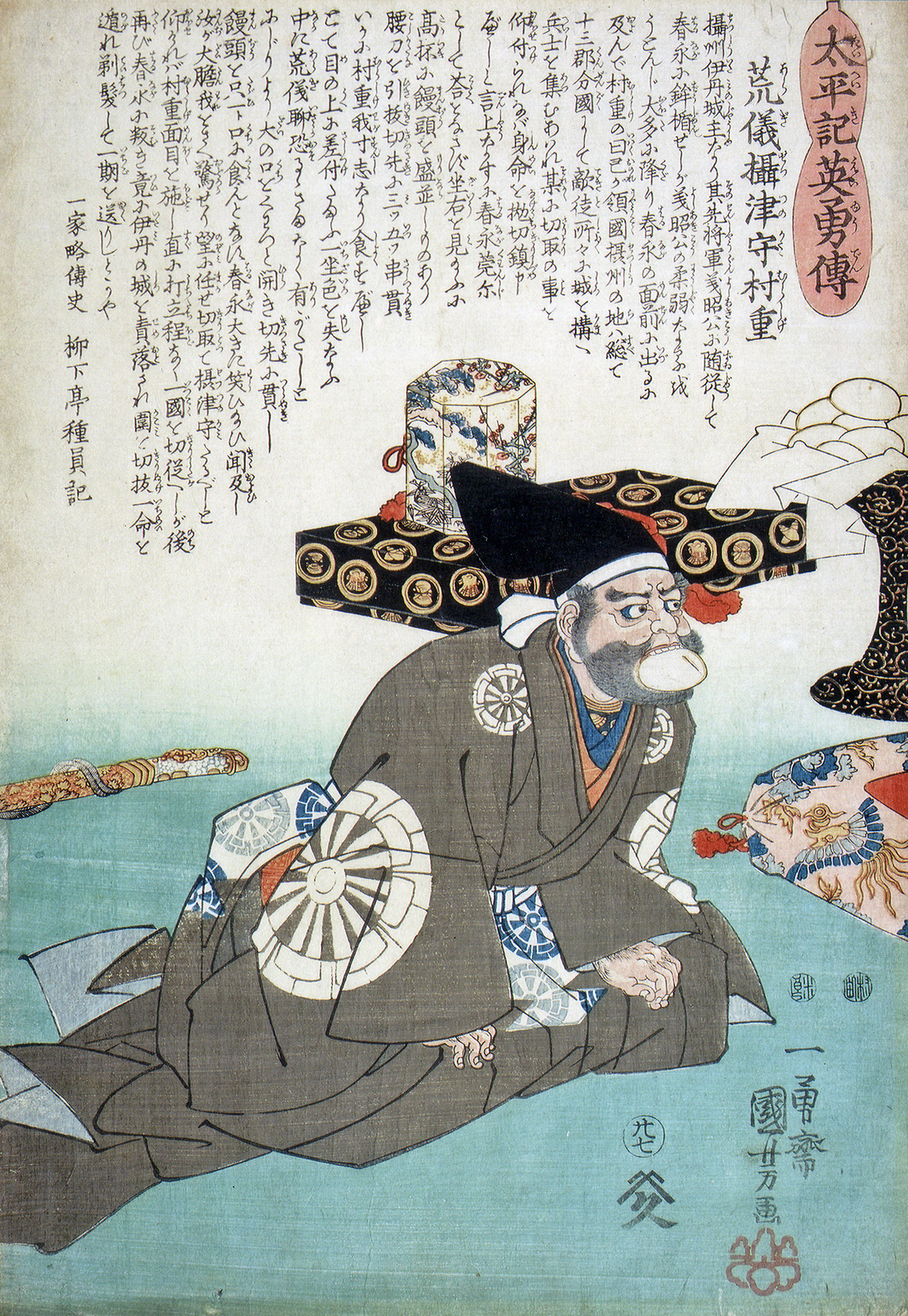

Lord of Ibaraki castle
- In office 1573–1574

Lord of Itami castle
- In office 1574–1579

Personal details
- Born: 1535
- Died: June 20, 1586 (aged 50–51)

Military service
- Allegiance: Settsu-Ikeda clan Oda clan
- Rank: Daimyo
- Battles/wars: Battle of Shiraigawara (1571); Siege of Itami (1574); Siege of Ishiyama-Honganji (1576); Siege of Miki (1578); Siege of Itami (1579); Siege of Hanakuma (1580)

Araki Murashige (荒木 村重; 1535 – June 20, 1586) was a retainer of Ikeda Katsumasa, head of the powerful "Setssu-Ikeda clan" of Settsu Province. Under Katsumasa, Murashige sided with Oda Nobunaga following Nobunaga's successful campaign to establish power in Kyoto.

== Military life ==
Murashige became a retainer of Oda Nobunaga and become daimyō (feudal lord) of Ibaraki Castle in 1573 and gained further notoriety through military exploits across Japan.

In 1571, Murashige and Nakagawa Kiyohide killed Wada Koremasa, a senior retainer of the Ashikaga Shogunate, at the Battle of Shiraigawara.

In 1574, Murashige along with Hashiba Hideyoshi captured Arioka Castle (Itami castle) from Itami Chikaoki. Nobunaga gave Itami castle to Murashige.

In 1576, he commanded part of Nobunaga's army in the ten-year siege of the Ishiyama Honganji. But in 1578, during the Siege of Miki, he was accused of sympathies to the Mōri clan, one of Nobunaga's enemies. Murashige retreated to Itami Castle (Hyōgo Prefecture) and held out there against a one-year siege by the forces of Oda before the castle fell in 1579.

After the Oda forces took control of Itami Castle in November 1579, Nobunaga ordered the execution of members of the Araki family and the families of Araki Murashige's retainers. The Shinchō Kōki records a total of 670 victims.

Araki escaped from the Siege of Itami (1579) and lived the rest of his life as a chanoyu disciple of Sen no Rikyū. He also served as a teaist and took the tea name of Dōkun 道薫. Rikyū shared some of his most detailed teachings with Murashige, one example being the well-known ‘Araki Settsu Kami-ate Densho’ (荒木摂津守宛伝書) manuscript. In the ‘Teaist Genealogy of All Generations Past and Present’ (Kokin Chajin Keifu 古今茶人系譜), Murashige is included as one of Rikyū’s Seven Sages.

In 1580, Ikeda Tsuneoki beat Murashige at Siege of Hanakuma castle, who locked himself in the castle. Ultimately, he escaped and defected to the Mori clan. Later Tsuneoki was given Murashige's domain.

== Tale ==
There is a semi-legendary tale told about Araki's creative use of a tessen, or iron fan, in saving his own life. After being accused of treason by Akechi Mitsuhide, Araki was called before his lord, Oda Nobunaga. As was customary, he bowed low over the threshold before entering the room. But he sensed somehow Nobunaga's plan to have his guards slam the fusuma sliding doors on him, breaking his neck. Araki placed his fan in the doors' groove, preventing the doors from closing. Nobunaga's plan revealed, Araki's life was spared, with much reconciliation.

His son, raised under his mother's name, was the artist Iwasa Matabei.

== Popular culture ==
- Honobu Yonezawa's 2021 Naoki Prize-winning novel "The Samurai and the Prisoner (Kokurōjō)" tells the story of Murashige during the siege of Itami. In its 2026 film adaptation, he is played by Masahiro Motoki.
