= Itami Castle =

Japanese castle

- 伊丹城
- Itami, Hyōgo Prefecture, Japan
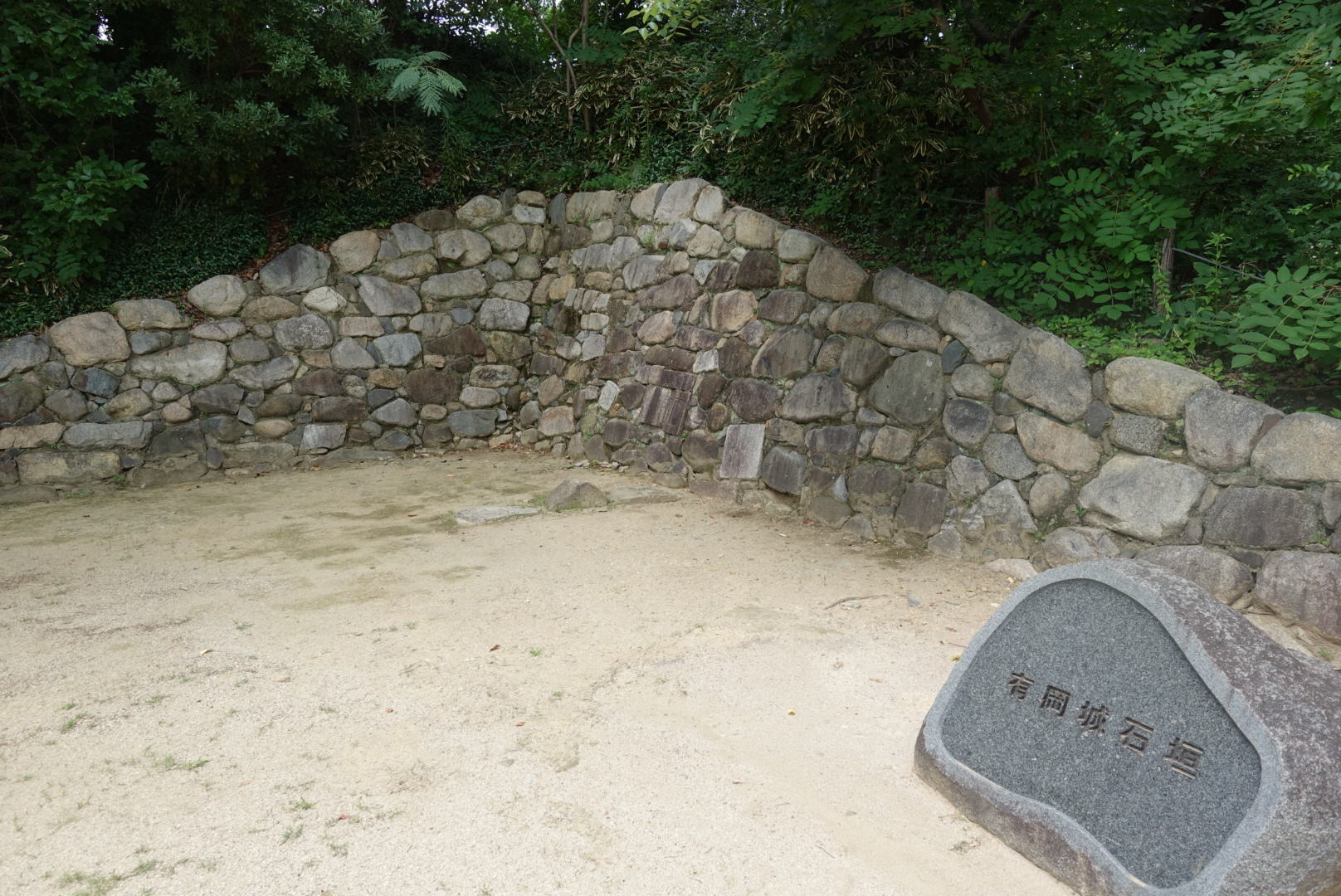
- Stone wall of Honmaru Base

Site information
- Type: flatland-style Japanese castle
- Condition: Ruins

Location
- Coordinates: 34°46′52.66″N 135°25′15.21″E

Site history
- Built: Nanboku-chō period
- Built by: Itami clan
- Demolished: 1583
- National Historic Site of Japan

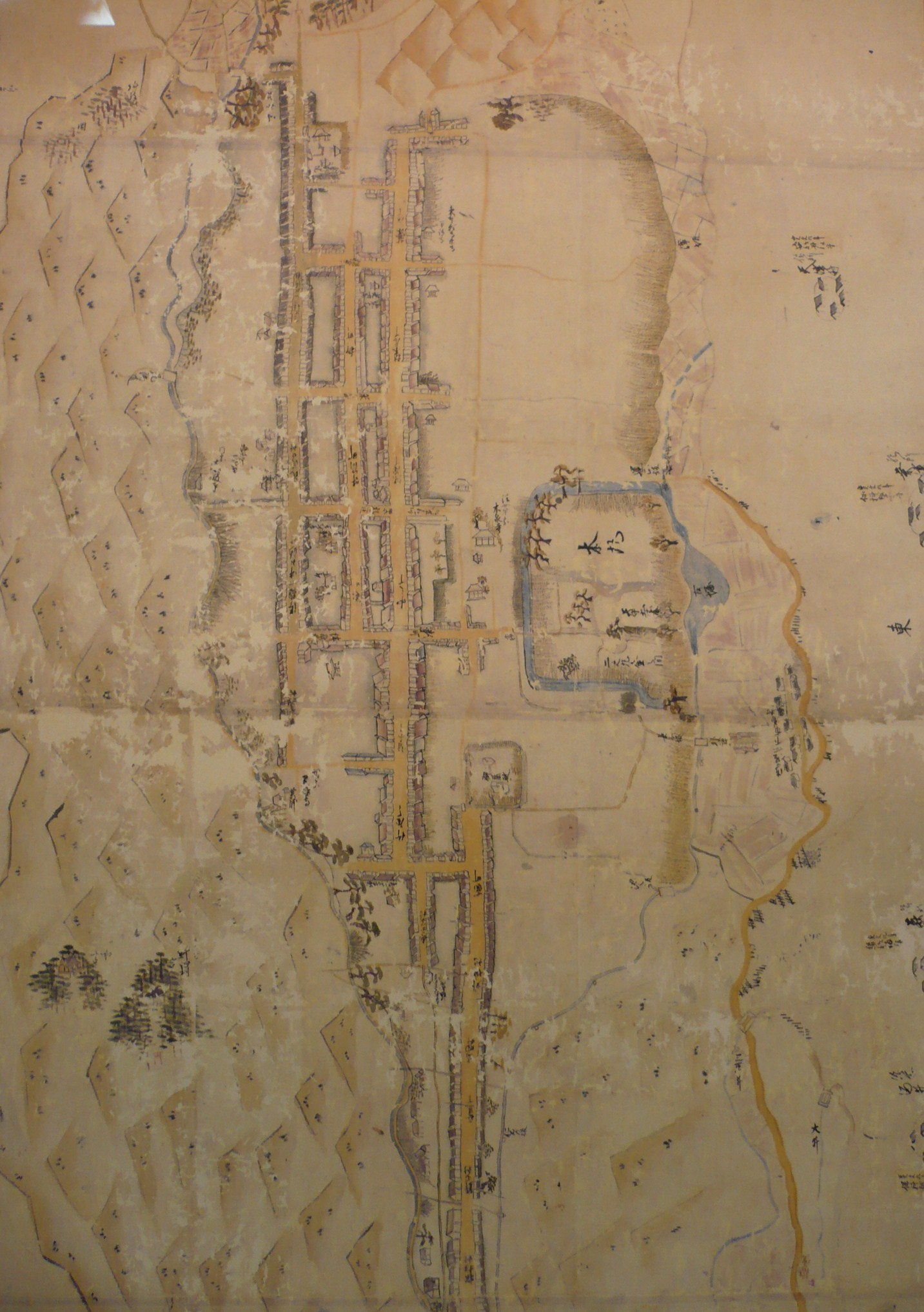
Map of Itami Castle.

Itami Castle (伊丹城, Itami-jō) was a Muromachi period Japanese castle located in Kawabe District of northern Settsu Province (what is now the city of Itami, Hyōgo Prefecture), Japan. It is also called Arioka Castle (有岡城 or 在岡城, Arioka-jō). Its ruins have been protected as a National Historic Site since 1979. The ruins of the castle are located just in front of today's Itami Station.

== History ==
Itami Castle was constructed by the Itami clans minor samurai clan who controlled this area of Settsu Province in the Nanboku-chō period. It was extensively remodeled in 1472. In 1574, Araki Murashige demolished the castle, and rebuilt it as one of the largest castles in this region. He also changed its name from Itami Castle to Arioka Castle. However, after Araki rebelled against Oda Nobunaga, the castle was attacked during the Siege of Itami (1579). According to Turnbull, the castle was captured "by digging a long tunnel from outside the walls to a spot near to the castle's keep." The castle was awarded to Ikeda Motosuke, one of Nobunaga's generals, in 1580. Ikeda was transferred to a new domain in Mino Province in 1583 and the castle was abandoned.

At its height, the castle extended from 1.7 kilometers north-to-south by 0.8 kilometers east-to-west, and was an early example of a Sogamae (総構え) type of fortification in which the entire castle town forms part of the defenses by being completely encircled by moats and earthen ramparts, and with the arrangement of streets and townhouses planned as part of the defensive belt. The Itami River, Daroku River and the Ina River form part of the natural fortifications, and were connected by moats on the west and south. Three fortresses were placed a key points on the outer defense line. The structure was strong enough to withstand attacks by Oda Nobunaga's large army for a year.

The east side of the castle site was destroyed in 1891 due to railway construction, and most of Honmaru (inner bailey) has been lost. Archaeological excavations were performed on the site from 1975, with remnants of moats, wells and stone walls uncovered. The stone walls incorporated gravestones and stone pagodas which had been plundered from Buddhist temples in the vicinity. The castle site is now open as a public park.

== Access ==
- Itami Station (Hankyu) of Hankyu Itami Line
- Itami Station (JR West) of Fukuchiyama Line

== See also ==
- List of Historic Sites of Japan (Hyōgo)
- Inano Shrine
