= Terumo Shrine =

Shinto shrine in Fukuoka City (translation of 光雲神社)

Terumo Shrine 光雲神社
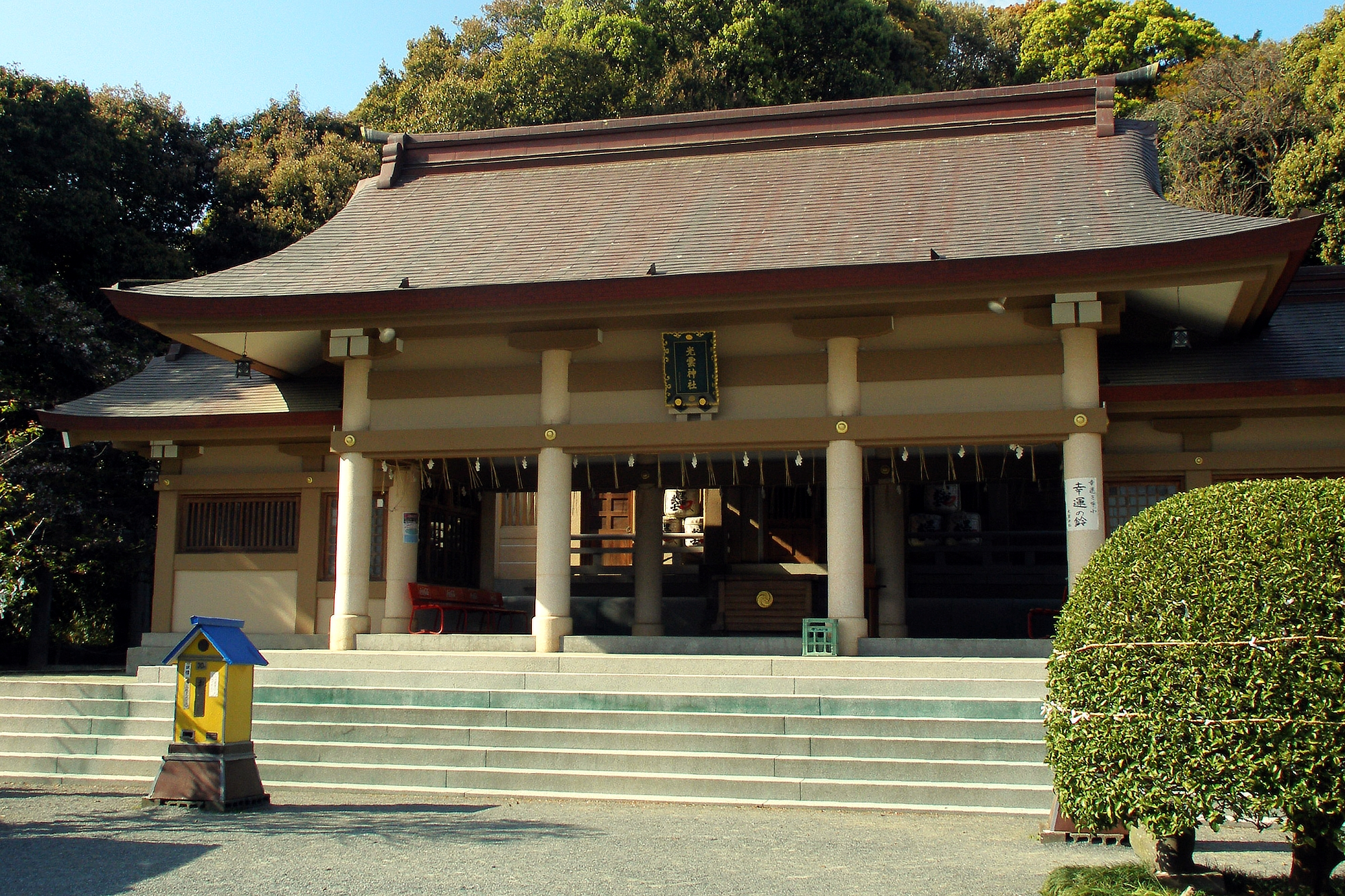

Location
- Location: 13-1 Nishi Park, Chūō-ku, Fukuoka City, Fukuoka Prefecture Terumo Shrine (Fukuoka Prefecture)
- Interactive map of Terumo Shrine 光雲神社
- Coordinates: 33°35′50″N 130°22′35″E

Terumo Shrine (光雲神社) is a Shinto shrine in Fukuoka City. Latterly located in Nishi Park in the Chūō-ku ward of the city, the shrine and all contents were destroyed in 1945; a reconstruction in modern materials was erected in 1966.

== Summary ==
Terumo Shrine was classified as a prefectural shrine but is now classified as a Beppyo shrine by the Association of Shinto Shrines. It enshrines Kuroda Yoshitaka, the founder of the historical Fukuoka Domain, and his son, Kuroda Nagamasa, the first daimyō of the domain. The name was derived from the second characters of the posthumous Buddhist names of those enshrined; 光 (light) from Yoshitaka, and 雲 (cloud) from Nagamasa.

On the grounds, there is a statue of Mori Tomonobu, a feudal retainer of the Fukuoka Domain, and one of the twenty-four Kuroda Horsemen. Below the statue, a folk song based on Mori called ‘Kuroda Bushi’ is engraved. There is also a sculpture of Nagamasa’s favored horned helmet... The ceiling of the front shine is decorated with a painting by Shin Kihara called 謡鶴 (utaidzuru, ‘Singing Cranes’), which makes the call of a crane when an offering is given

In Kakiha Shrine, an auxiliary shrine of Terumo Shrine, Kuroda Shigetaka, Kuroda Mototaka, Kuroda Tadayuki, Kuroda Tsunayuki, Atsuhime (daughter of Kuroda Tsugutaka and fiancée of Daigo Fuyuyoshi), and other related figures are enshrined as kami. The plaque on the front of the shrine bearing its name was designed by Kuroda Nagahisa, the fifteenth head of the Kuroda clan. The road to this shrine, affectionately known as ‘Nishi Park’s Sakura Path’ meets with Japan National Route 556, which passes between 3-chōme and 2-chōme of the Arato district of Fukuoka City

== History ==
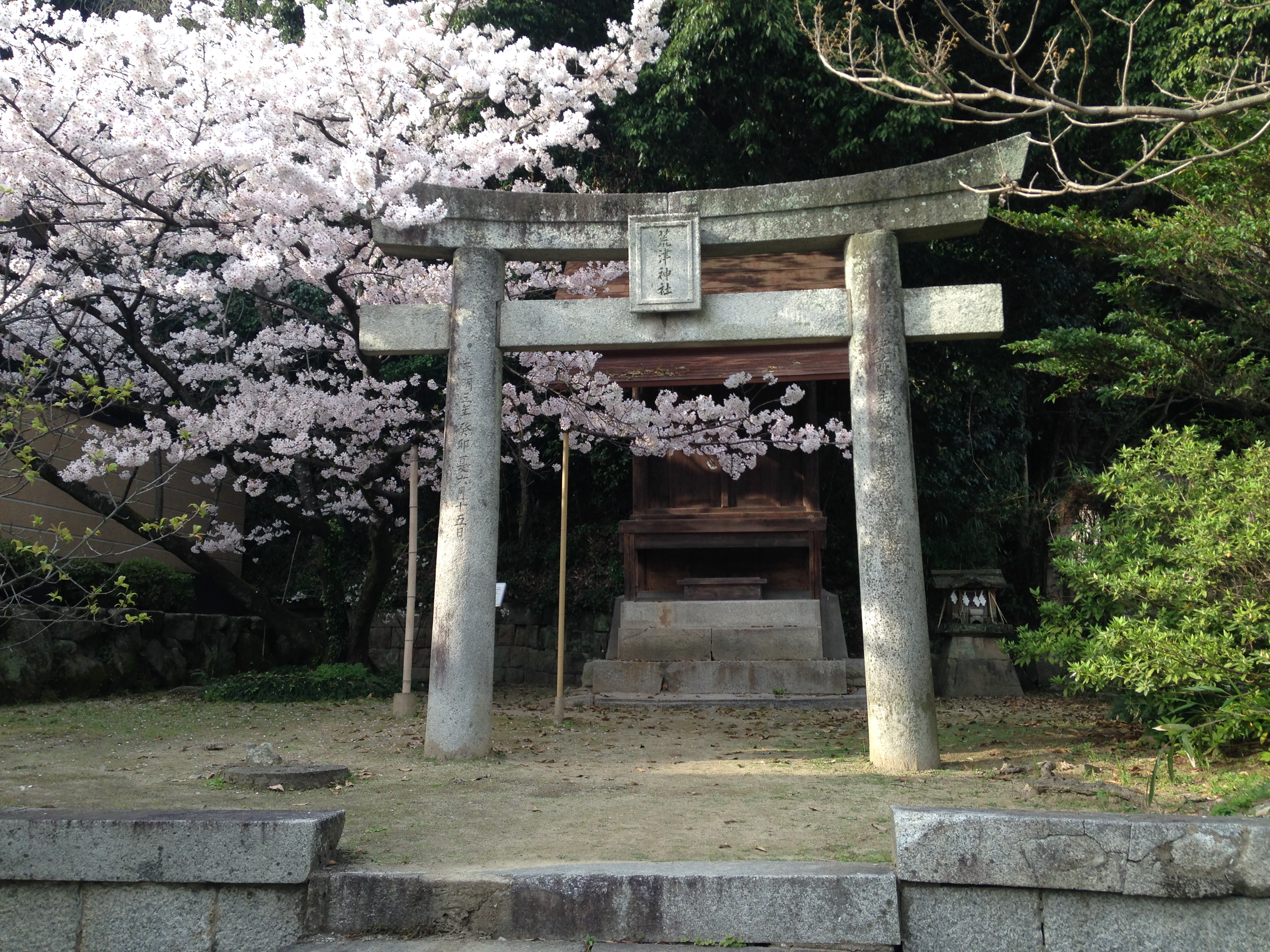
Aratsu Shrine in Terumo Shrine

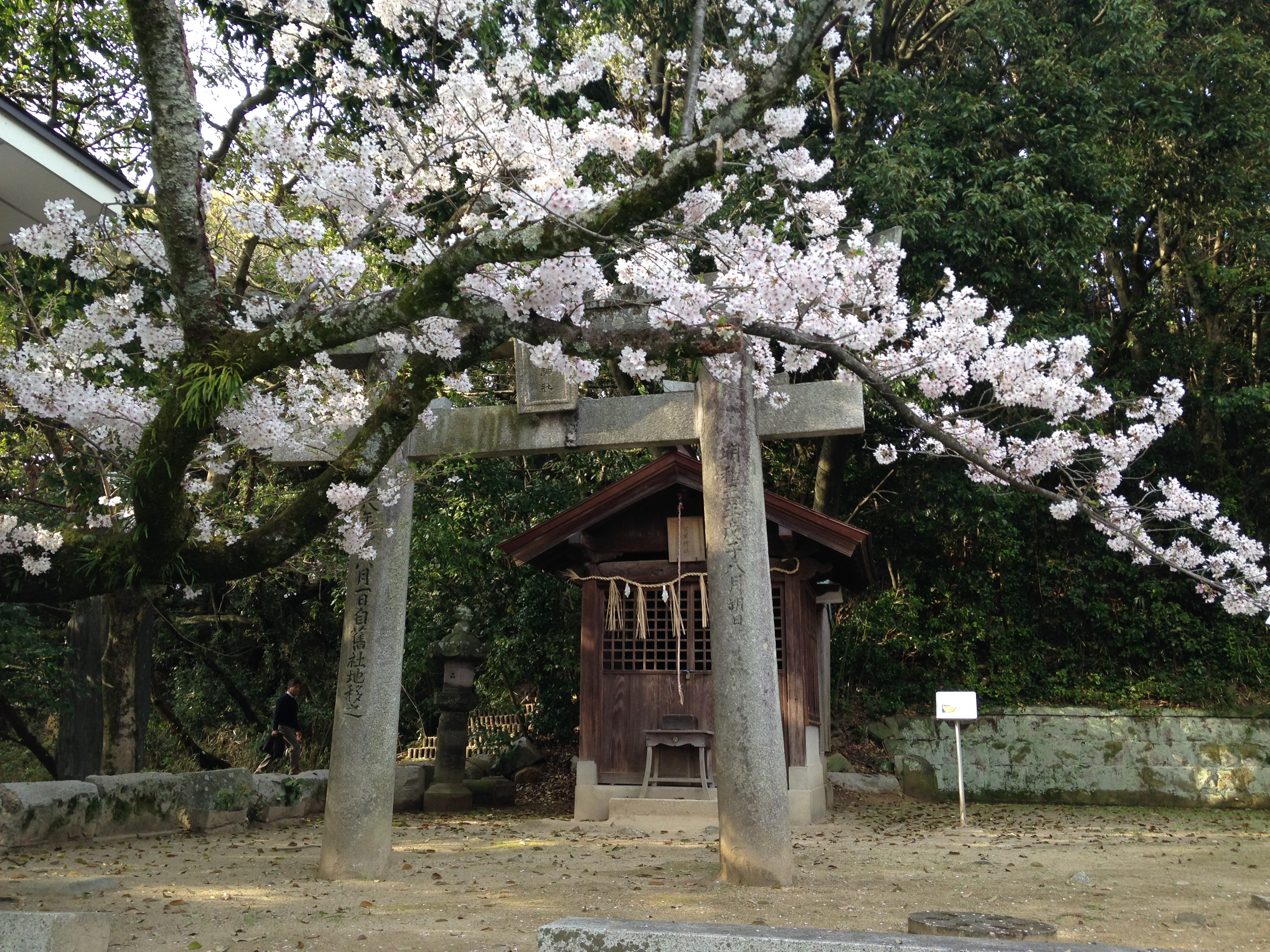
Kakiwa Shrine in Terumo Shrine

In 1766, the sixth daimyō of the Fukuoka domain, Kuroda Tsugutaka, built a hokora in the outer citadel of Fukuoka Castle to worship Nagamasa. Soon afterwards, Yoshitaka was enshrined there as well.

In 1871, the Kuroda family moved to Tokyo after the abolition of the feudal domain system and the implementation of the prefecture system. Interested parties petitioned the eleventh daimyō, Kuroda Nagahiro, to move the shrine from inside the castle to downtown Fukuoka. In 1875, it was classified as a prefectural shrine.

The shrine was moved again to its current location in Nishi Park in 1909. This location once had Aratoyama Tōshōgū, a shrine built by Kuroda Tadayuki. According to records of the Fukuoka Domain, the Aratoyama Tōshōgū had the most magnificent shrine buildings, surpassing the various Tōshō-gūs (shrines venerating Tokugawa Ieyasu) across Japan.

In 1945, the Bombing of Fukuoka completely destroyed Terumo Shrine. Documents, swords, and other treasures connected to the Kuroda family, and the main shrine building were lost in the resulting fires. In 1966, the shrine was rebuilt with concrete.
