= Gunshi Kanbei =

2014 taiga drama about Kuroda Kanbei

- Promotional poster
- Written by: Yoichi Maekawa
- Directed by: Kenji Tanaka; Kazuhiro Motoki
- Starring: Junichi Okada; Miki Nakatani; Akira Terao; Shōsuke Tanihara; Tori Matsuzaka; Yuki Uchida; Toma Ikuta; Shunpūtei Koasa; Fumi Nikaidō; Tetsushi Tanaka; Mirei Kiritani; Gaku Hamada; Mokomichi Hayami; Issei Takahashi; Kei Tanaka; Mitsuki Takahata; Kazuhiro Yamaji; Shingo Tsurumi; Takanori Jinnai; Tsurutaro Kataoka; Masatō Ibu; Hitomi Kuroki; Yōsuke Eguchi; Naoto Takenaka; Kyōhei Shibata
- Theme music composer: Yugo Kanno
- Composer: Yugo Kanno
- Country of origin: Japan
- Original language: Japanese
- No. of episodes: 50

Production
- Executive producer: Takashi Nakamura
- Running time: 45–60 minutes

Original release
- Network: NHK
- Release: January 5 – December 21, 2014

Gunshi Kanbei (軍師官兵衛; Strategist Kanbei) is a 2014 Japanese historical drama television series and the 53rd NHK taiga drama. The series was broadcast from January 5 to December 21, 2014, and ran a total of 50 episodes. The drama depicts the life of Kuroda Kanbei (played by Junichi Okada), a retainer of daimyō Kodera Masamoto of Harima Province, and a strategist for daimyō Toyotomi Hideyoshi.

In 2026, this series became the first Taiga drama to be streamed on Netflix.

== Plot ==
The drama tells the story of Kuroda Kanbei, a son of Kuroda Mototaka, chief retainer of Kodera Masamoto who ruled Harima Province (currently Hyōgo Prefecture) in the 16th century. In troubled times, Kanbei persuades Kodera to join forces with the all-powerful Oda Nobunaga. Though imprisoned by Araki Murashige and lamed for life, Kanbei endures hardships and later becomes a strategist for Toyotomi Hideyoshi. His son Kuroda Nagamasa serves Tokugawa Ieyasu after the death of Hideyoshi.

== Production ==
- Screenwriter – Yoichi Maekawa
- Music – Yugo Kanno
- Titling – Shoshu
- Narrator – Shiho Fujimura→Shuko Hirose
- Historical research – Tetsuo Owada
- Sword fight arranger - Kunishirō Hayashi
- Architectural research – Kiyoshi Hirai
- Clothing research – Kiyoko Koizumi
- Production coordinator – Takashi Nakamura
- Director – Kenji Tanaka, Kazuhiro Motoki
- Performed by Warsaw National Philharmonic Orchestra
- Theme performed by NHK Symphony Orchestra

== Cast ==
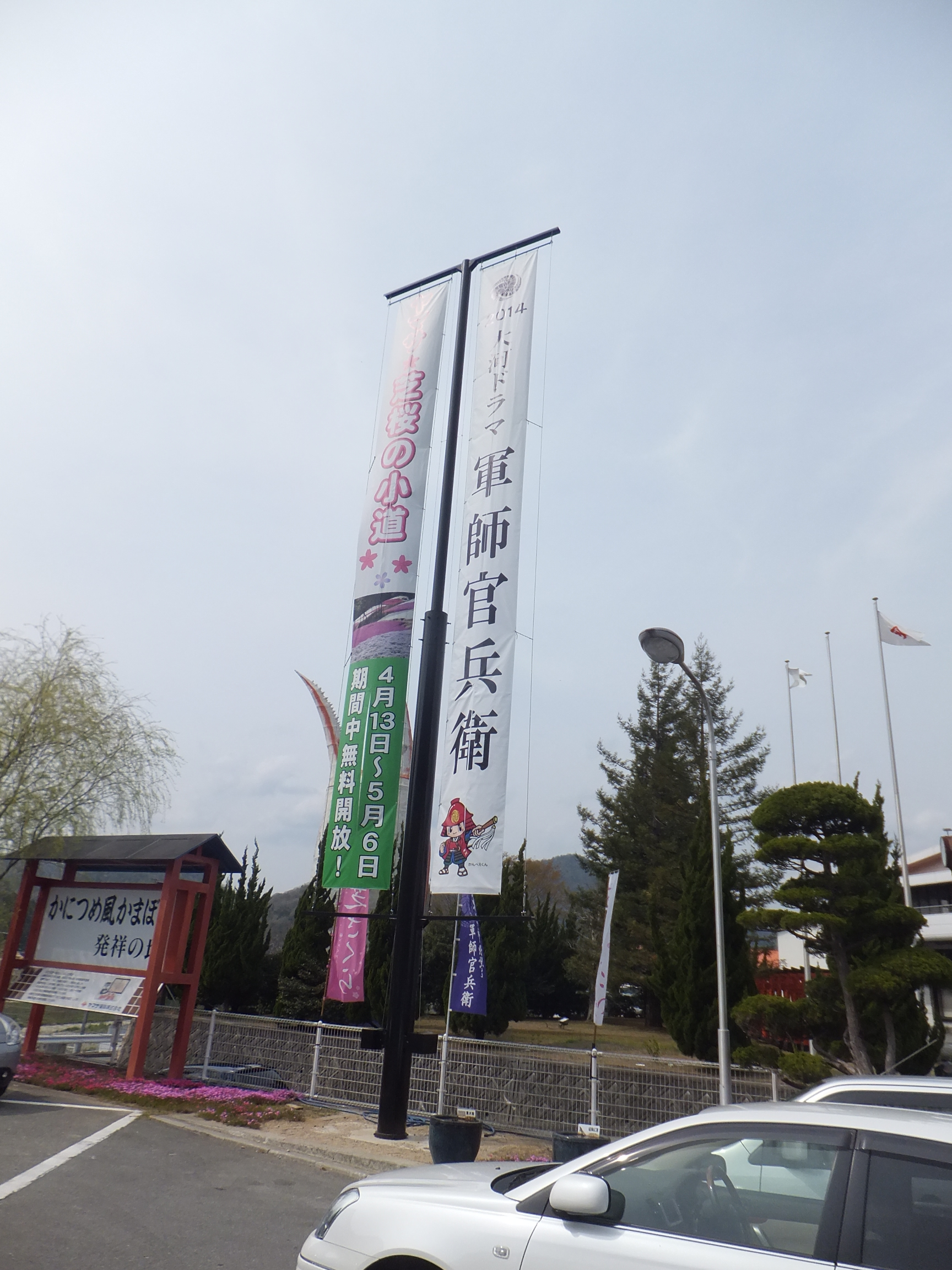
Banner of "Gunshi Kanbei" in Himeji

=== Kuroda family ===
- Kuroda Kanbei: Junichi Okada
  - Young Kanbei: Kirato Wakayama
- Kushihashi Teru: Miki Nakatani
- Kuroda Nagamasa: Tori Matsuzaka
  - Young Nagamasa (Shōjumaru): Kirato Wakayama
- Kuroda Mototaka: Kyōhei Shibata
- Kuroda Kyumu: Daisuke Ryu
- Kuroda Shigetaka: Raita Ryū
- Kuriyama Zensuke: Gaku Hamada
- Mori Tahei: Mokomichi Hayami
- Inoue Kuroemon Yurifusa: Issei Takahashi
- Gotō Matabei: Takashi Tsukamoto
- Mori Kohei: Sansei Shiomi
- Mori Buhei: Masaru Nagai
- Ito: Mitsuki Takahata
- Omichi: Rila Fukushima
- Eihime: Miyu Yoshimoto

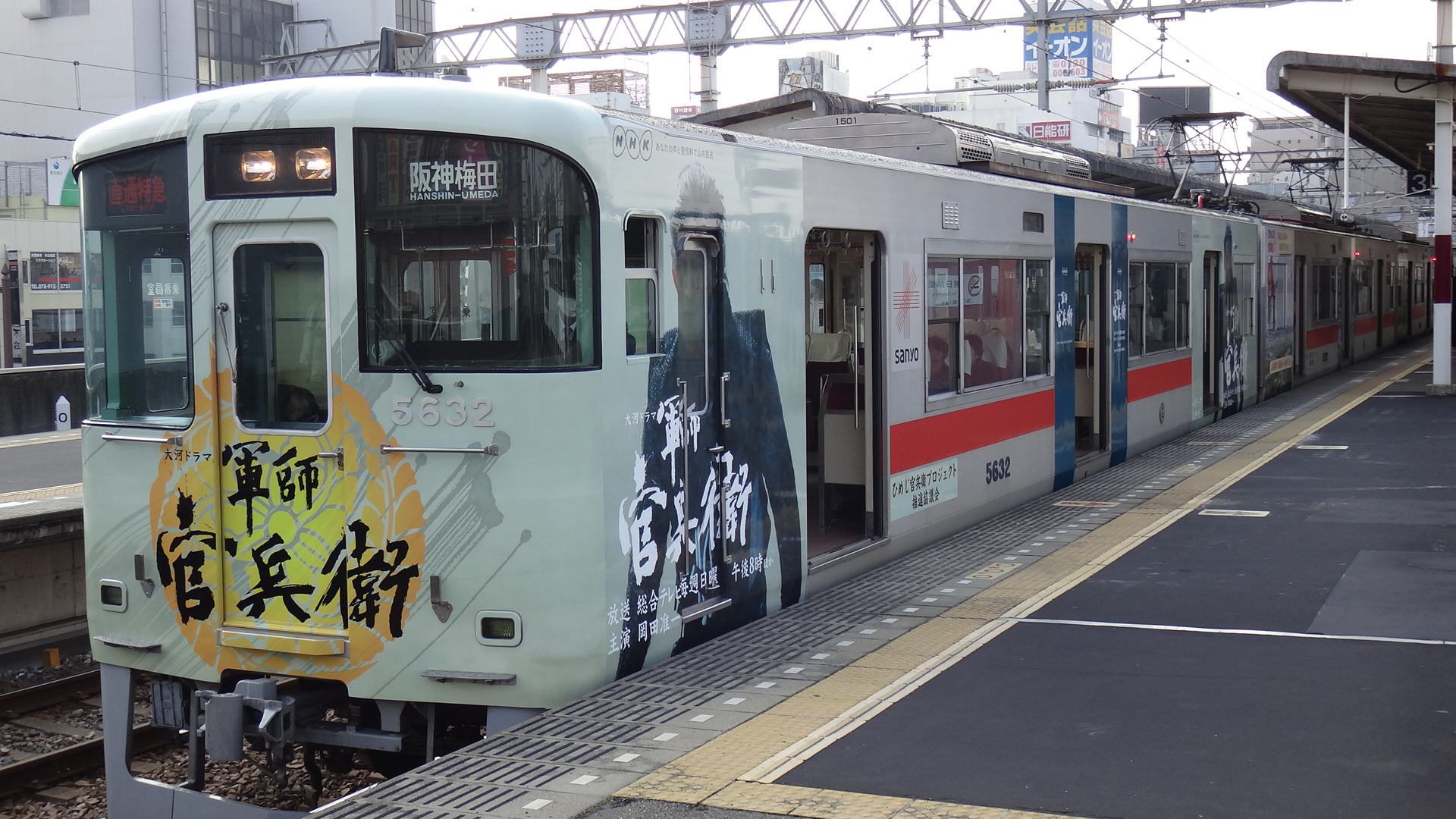
"Kanbei Train"

=== Ibuki ===
- Ibuki Zenemon: Isao Bito
- Tatsu: Nao Minamisawa

=== Kodera Clan ===
- Kodera Masamoto: Tsurutaro Kataoka
- Kon: Saki Takaoka
- Kushihashi Sakyonosuke: Toru Masuoka
- Kushihashi Sayonoshin: Nobuaki Kaneko
- Ogō Yoshitoshi: Tsutomu Isobe

=== Oda Clan ===
- Oda Nobunaga: Yōsuke Eguchi
- No: Yuki Uchida
- Akechi Mitsuhide: Shunputei Koasa
- Niwa Nagahide: Hiroshi Katsuno
- Shibata Katsuie: Yoshimasa Kondo
- Dota Gozen: Naoko Otani
- Yasuke: Bernard Ackah
- Oichi: Kyoko Uchida
- Oda Nobutada: Tomoya Nakamura
- Oda Nobutaka: Masei Nakayama
- Oda Nobukatsu: Shōta Kosakai
- Mori Ranmaru: Hayato Kakizawa

=== Toyotomi Clan ===
- Toyotomi Hideyoshi: Naoto Takenaka
- One: Hitomi Kuroki
- Takenaka Hanbei: Shosuke Tanihara
- Hachisuka Koroku: Pierre Taki
- Ishida Mitsunari: Kei Tanaka
- Cha-cha: Fumi Nikaidō
- Toyotomi Hidenaga: Noritoshi Kashima
- Fukushima Masanori: Hideo Ishiguro
- Katō Kiyomasa: Shinnosuke Abe
- Toyotomi Hidetsugu: Akiyoshi Nakao
- Konishi Yukinaga: Shugo Oshinari
- Magdalena: Mako Ishino
- Sassa Narimasa: Ryosuke Otani
- Ukita Hideie: Kouhei Takeda
- Kobayakawa Hideaki: Yosuke Asari
- Ōtani Yoshitsugu: Shingo Murakami
- Ōno Harunaga: Yasuhito Shimao

=== Tokugawa Clan ===
- Tokugawa Ieyasu: Akira Terao
- Ii Naomasa: Mikihisa Azuma
- Honda Tadakatsu: Masayuki Shionoya
- Sakakibara Yasumasa: Ikuji Nakamura

=== Mōri Clan ===
- Mōri Terumoto: Kota Miura
- Kobayakawa Takakage: Shingo Tsurumi
- Kikkawa Motoharu: Kazutoyo Yoshimi
- Ankokuji Ekei: Kazuhiro Yamaji
- Ukita Naoie: Takanori Jinnai
- Shimizu Muneharu: Takashi Ukaji
- Kikkawa Motonaga: Masayuki Deai

=== Amago Clan ===
- Yamanaka Shikanosuke: Tetsuya Bessho
- Amago Katsuhisa: Kinihiro Suda
- Kamei Korenori: Takaaki Seki

=== Others ===
- Araki Murashige: Tetsushi Tanaka
- Dashi: Mirei Kiritani
- Ashikaga Yoshiaki: Mitsuru Fukikoshi
- Sen no Rikyū: Masatō Ibu
- Takayama Ukon/Dom Justo Takayama: Toma Ikuta
- Maeda Toshiie: Tadashi Yokouchi
- Yoshida Kanemi: Masami Horiuchi
- Otsuru: Yui Ichikawa
- Ōtomo Sōrin: Tsunehiko Kamijō
- Utsunomiya Shigefusa: Takehiro Murata
- Hōjō Ujimasa: Goro Ibuki
- Hōjō Ujinao: Masayoshi Haneda
- Matsunaga Hisahide: Mickey Curtis
- Gnecchi-Soldo Organtino: Bob Werley
- Luís Fróis: Oziel Nozaki
- Gaspar Coelho: Ricardo Teixeira

== TV schedule ==
Episode	Original airdate	Title	Directed by	Rating
1	January 5, 2014	"Ikinokori no Okite" (生き残りの掟)	Kenji Tanaka	18.9%
2	January 12, 2014	"Wasure'enu Hatsukoi" (忘れえぬ初恋)	Kenji Tanaka	16.9%
3	January 19, 2014	"Inochi no Tsukaimichi" (命の使い道)	Kenji Tanaka	18.0%
4	January 26, 2014	"Atarashiki Kadode" (新しき門出)	Kazuhiro Motoki	16.5%
5	February 2, 2014	"Shitō no Hate" (死闘の果て)	Kazuhiro Motoki	16.0%
6	February 9, 2014	"Nobunaga no Kake" (信長の賭け)	Kenji Tanaka	15.0%
7	February 16, 2014	"Ketsudan no Toki" (決断のとき)	Kenji Tanaka	15.2%
8	February 23, 2014	"Hideyoshi toiu Otoko" (秀吉という男)	Kenji Tanaka	16.1%
9	March 2, 2014	"Kanbei Tamesareru" (官兵衛試される)	Kazuhiro Motoki	15.4%
10	March 9, 2014	"Mōri Shūrai" (毛利襲来)	Kazuhiro Motoki	15.7%
11	March 16, 2014	"Inochigake no Utage" (命がけの宴)	Taku Ōhara	15.8%
12	March 23, 2014	"Hitojichi Shōjumaru" (人質松寿丸)	Taku Ōhara	15.8%
13	March 30, 2014	"Kodera wa Madaka" (小寺はまだか)	Kenji Tanaka	12.9%
14	April 6, 2014	"Hikisakareru Shimai" (引き裂かれる姉妹)	Kazuhiro Motoki	14.8%
15	April 13, 2014	"Harima Bundan" (播磨分断)	Taku Ōhara	14.9%
16	April 20, 2014	"Kōzuki-jō no Mamori" (上月城の守り)	Kenji Tanaka	16.2%
17	April 27, 2014	"Misuterareta Shiro" (見捨てられた城)	Kazuhiro Motoki	15.6%
18	May 4, 2014	"Uragiru Riyū" (裏切る理由)	Taku Ōhara	12.3%
19	May 11, 2014	"Hijō no Wana" (非情の罠)	Kenji Tanaka	13.7%
20	May 18, 2014	"Toraware no Gunshi" (囚われの軍師)	Kazuhiro Motoki	15.0%
21	May 25, 2014	"Shōjumaru no Inochi" (松寿丸の命)	Taku Ōhara	14.8%
22	June 1, 2014	"Arioka, Saigo no Hi" (有岡、最後の日)	Kenji Tanaka	16.6%
23	June 8, 2014	"Hanbei no Yuigon" (半兵衛の遺言)	Kazuhiro Motoki	16.0%
24	June 15, 2014	"Kaettekita Gunshi" (帰ってきた軍師)	Taku Ōhara	17.5%
25	June 22, 2014	"Eeiga no Kiwami" (栄華の極み)	Kenji Tanaka	16.4%
26	June 29, 2014	"Nagamasa Uijin" (長政初陣)	Kazuhiro Motoki	14.9%
27	July 6, 2014	"Takamatsu-jō Mizu-zeme" (高松城水攻め)	Taku Ōhara	16.7%
28	July 13, 2014	"Honnō-ji no Hen" (本能寺の変)	Kenji Tanaka	17.5%
29	July 20, 2014	"Tenka no Hisaku" (天下の秘策)	Kazuhiro Motoki	19.4%
30	July 27, 2014	"Chūgoku Ōgaeshi" (中国大返し)	Taku Ōhara	15.6%
31	August 3, 2014	"Tenkabito eno Michi" (天下人への道)	Hirokazu Ozaki	18.2%
32	August 10, 2014	"Saraba, Chichi yo!" (さらば、父よ！)	Kazuhiro Motoki	16.1%
33	August 17, 2014	"Kizudarake no Tamashii" (傷だらけの魂)	Taku Ōhara	16.7%
34	August 24, 2014	"Kyūshū Shutsujin" (九州出陣)	Hirokazu Ozaki	13.0%
35	August 31, 2014	"Hideyoshi no Takurami" (秀吉のたくらみ)	Kenji Tanaka	14.5%
36	September 7, 2014	"Shiren no Shintenchi" (試練の新天地)	Kazuhiro Motoki	15.1%
37	September 14, 2014	"Kiidani-jō no Higeki" (城井谷の悲劇)	Taku Ōhara	14.6%
38	September 21, 2014	"Oikomareru Gunshi" (追い込まれる軍師)	Hideki Fujinami	15.0%
39	September 28, 2014	"Ato wo Tsugu Mono" (跡を継ぐ者)	Kenji Tanaka	14.6%
40	October 5, 2014	"Odawara no Rakujitsu" (小田原の落日)	Taku Ōhara	17.6%
41	October 12, 2014	"Otoko-tachi no Kakugo" (男たちの覚悟)	Hideki Fujinami	14.1%
42	October 19, 2014	"Taikō no Yabō" (太閤の野望)	Kazuhiro Motoki	15.6%
43	October 26, 2014	"Josui Tanjō" (如水誕生)	Kenji Tanaka	15.3%
44	November 2, 2014	"Ochiyuku Kyosei" (落ちゆく巨星)	Wataru Suzuki	15.0%
45	November 9, 2014	"Hideyoshi no Saigo" (秀吉の最期)	Taku Ōhara	16.8%
46	November 16, 2014	"Ieyasu Ugoku" (家康動く)	Kazuhiro Motoki	16.4%
47	November 23, 2014	"Josui Hakaru" (如水謀る)	Kenji Tanaka	15.4%
48	November 30, 2014	"Tenka Dōran" (天下動乱)	Taku Ōhara	16.6%
49	December 7, 2014	"Josui Saigo no Shōbu" (如水最後の勝負)	Kazuhiro Motoki	15.8%
50	December 21, 2014	"Ranse Koko ni Owaru" (乱世ここに終わる)	Kenji Tanaka	17.6%
Average rating 15.8% - Rating is based on Japanese Video Research (Kantō region).

== Production ==
Hideyoshi, the 1996 Taiga drama starring Naoto Takenaka, was a major hit with an average viewership rating exceeding 30%. However, Takenaka felt somewhat unsatisfied that the drama did not depict Hideyoshi's final years. Eighteen years later, when he was cast to play Hideyoshi once again, Takenaka expressed his enthusiasm, stating, "I feel like I can achieve what I couldn't do before. I look forward to going to the set every day." As he had hoped, this new series depicted Hideyoshi's descent into darkness.

== Books ==
- NHK Taiga Drama Story Gunshi Kanbei Vol.1 ISBN 978-4-14-923345-1 (Official guide)
- Yoichi Maekawa and Kuniko Aoki, Taiga Drama Gunshi Kanbei, Tokyo, NHK Publishing Co., Ltd., 2014 (novelisation)
