= Takenaka Shigekado =

Takenaka Shigekado 竹中 重門

Head of Takenaka clan
- In office 1579–1631
- Preceded by: Takenaka Shigeharu
- Succeeded by: Takenaka Shigetsune

Personal details
- Born: 1573
- Died: November 2, 1631 (aged 57–58)
- Children: Takenaka Shigetsune
- Parent: Takenaka Shigeharu (father)

Military service
- Allegiance: Toyotomi clan Eastern Army; Tokugawa shogunate
- Unit: Takenaka clan
- Battles/wars: Battle of Komaki (1584); Battle of Sekigahara (1600)

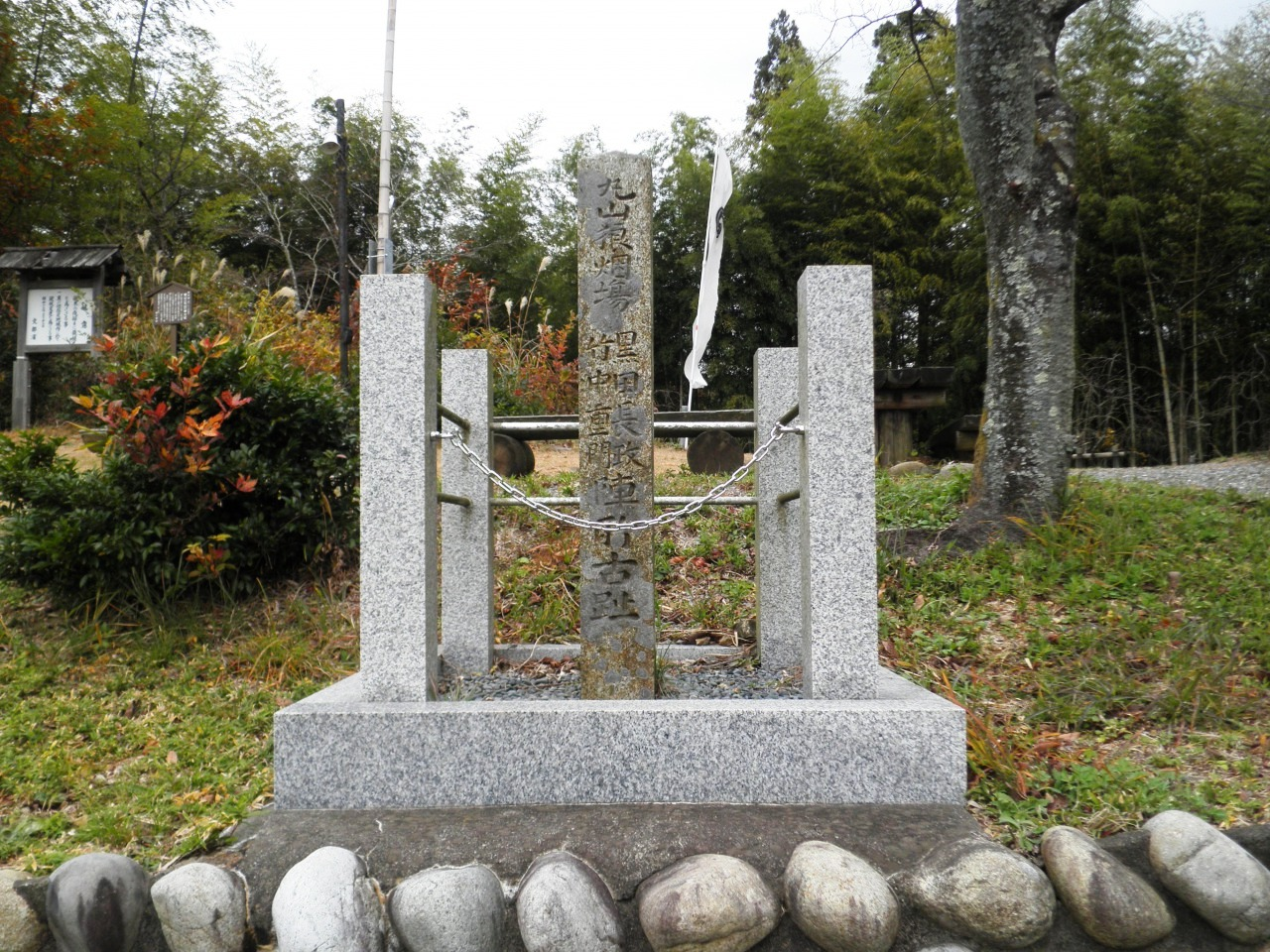
Site of Kuroda Nagamasa and Takenaka Shigekado's positions in the Battle of Sekigahara.

Takenaka Shigekado (竹中 重門; 1573 – November 2, 1631) was a Japanese samurai of the Azuchi–Momoyama period through early Edo period. The son of Takenaka Hanbei, Shigekado saw his first action at age 12, taking part in the Battle of Komaki in 1585.

Following in his father's footsteps and served Toyotomi Hideyoshi, later siding with Tokugawa Ieyasu. At the Battle of Sekigahara, Shigekado along with Kuroda Nagamasa attacked the Western Army's main camp and Shigekado succeeded in chasing down and executing Konishi Yukinaga.

In Shigekado's time, the Takenaka became kōtai-yoriai hatamoto. Studying Chinese and Japanese philosophy with Hayashi Razan, Shigekado was known for his skill in calligraphy and poetry.

Shigekado died in Edo at age 58, and was succeeded by his son Takenaka Shigetsune.
