= Sennyo-ji =

Buddhist temple in Itoshima, Fukuoka, Japan

Coordinates: 33°29′40.6″N 130°13′42.9″E

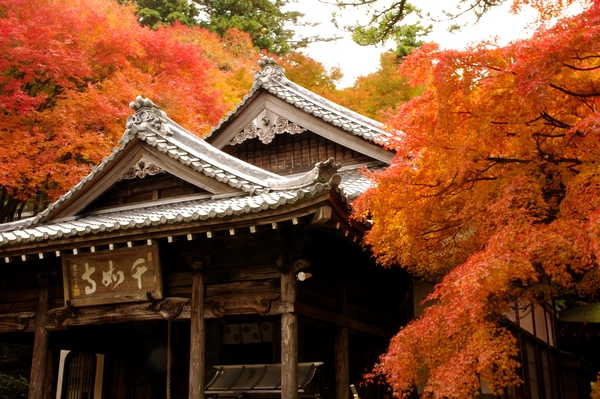
Main Hall

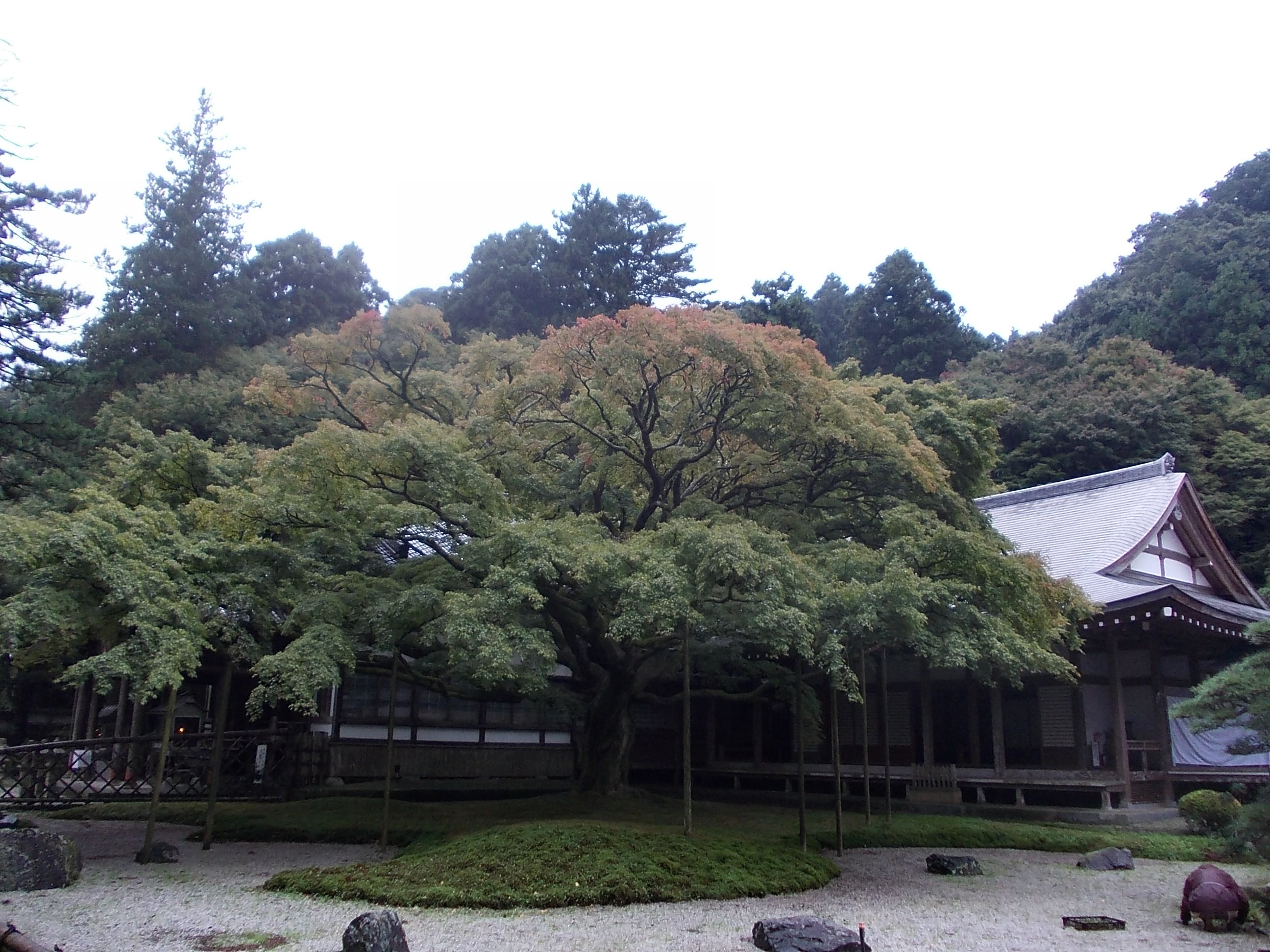
Sennyo-ji's big maple trees

Sennyo-ji (千如寺) is a Shingon temple in Itoshima, Fukuoka Prefecture, Japan. Its honorary sangō prefix is Sennyo-ji Daihiō-in (千如寺大悲王院). It is also referred to as Raizan Kannon (雷山観音).

According to the legend, Sennyo-ji was founded in the Nara period by Seiga, who came from India as a priest during the period.

Due to its position in the north overlooking the Sea of Genkai, it has been expected from the shogunate as a prayer temple of the foremost line against the Mongol invasions of Japan during the Kamakura period. In its heyday has been said to be lined up to 300 priest living quarters around the temple. Sennyo-ji is a general term of this temple, and it is also referred to as the priest's lodge that was located next to the middle sanctuary, the present day site of Ikazuchi-jinja. The wooden Avalokiteśvara statue is the subject of mountainous faith that has been enshrined in the main hall.

Afterwards the priest living quarters were ruined during the long war between Muromachi and Sengoku periods, there only remains the priest's lodge. In 1573, however, the main hall was founded by Kuroda Tsugutaka, the 6th feudal lord of Kuroda clan. Big maple trees, which has been designated as a natural monument of Fukuoka prefecture, has been said to be planted by him.

Mount Rai has two sanctuaries, one at the middle of the mountain and one at its peak. The middle sanctuary was founded in honor of Emperor Suinin whom he is conventionally considered to have reigned from 29 BC to AD 70. Both sanctuaries have been governed by the temple until the Edo period. However, the priest's lodge in the middle sanctuary was abolished by the separation of Shinto from Buddhism, introduced after the Meiji Restoration. Cultural properties, such as Buddha statues including the main Buddha and the ancient documents, were moved to the main hall.

The temple is also known for being a great place for cherry blossom viewing in the spring, and many people visit in the autumn to see the fall foliage.

== Important Cultural Properties ==
The 4.8-meter (16 ft) wooden Avalokiteśvara statue in the main hall is the work of the Kamakura period.

== See also ==
- Mount Rai
