= Kushihashi Teru =

Japanese aristocrat (1553–1627)

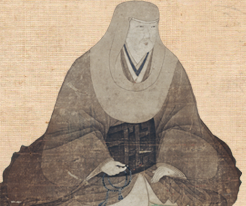
Kushihashi Teru

Kushihashi Teru (櫛橋 光, 1553 – October 5, 1627) was a Japanese noblewoman and aristocrat of the Sengoku period, who was the only wife of daimyo Kuroda Yoshitaka. Although her husband and son Nagamasa were once Kirishitan (Christian), Teruhime was a devoted to Pure Land Buddhism.

== Biography ==
=== Early life, genealogy and marriage ===
Kushihashi Teru was born in 1553 as the daughter of Kushihashi Koresada, the lord of Shikata Castle in Harima Province, and later became the foster daughter of Kodera Masamoto. She had brothers, Kusihashi Masai and Kusihashi Norimasa, a sister named Myōju-ni (wife of Uzuki Kagesada), and a younger sister, the wife of Inoue Yukinobu.

In 1567 she married Kuroda Yoshitaka, a retainer of the Kodera clan. She gave birth to Kuroda Nagamasa in 1568 and Kuroda Kumanosuke in 1582. Teru's husband, impressed by Oda Nobunaga's talents, recommended allegiance to his lord, Kodera Masatsugu, and served as a vanguard in campaigns, including against the Mōri clan.

=== Service under Oda clan ===
Joining Oda Nobunaga exposed the Kuroda family to new enemies, leading to multiple battles. In the 1577, Kuroda Kanbei's strategy ambushed Mori naval forces, using flags from nearby farmers to feign reinforcements, successfully forcing a retreat. Oda Nobunaga recognized Kuroda's prowess, placing the Kuroda and Koide families under Toyotomi Hideyoshi for the campaign to unify Japan. Kuroda Kanbei, showing loyalty, surrendered Himeji Castle to Toyotomi Hideyoshi, offering his 10-year-old son, Kuroda Nagamasa, as a hostage. Caring for Teru's son was Nene (Hideyoshi's wife). Despite not having children, Hideyoshi and Nene treated hostage children as their own.

=== Siege of Miki (1578-1580) ===
When Bessho Nagaharu rebelled against Oda Nobunaga in 1578, the Kushihashi clan sided with Nagaharu. The surrounding powerful clans of Harima, led by Bessho Nagaharu, turned against Nobunaga, Teru's brother, Kusihashi Masai, also joined the opposition.

Kuroda Kanbei, a strategist for Toyotomi Hideyoshi, faced hardship as his wife's family, the Kusihashi, betrayed the Oda side, and Araki Murashige rebelled. To persuade Murashige, Kuroda ventured to Arioka Castle, was captured, and remained out of contact for nearly a year. Amid suspicions of rebellion, Oda Nobunaga ordered Takenaka Hanbei to kill Kuroda Nagamasa. With the help of Yamauchi Kazutoyo and his wife, Yamauchi Chiyo and Takenaka Hanbei, Kuroda Nagamasa was hidden, saving his life.

Unfortunately, the siege of Shikata Castle by Oda Nobukatsu's forces led to its surrender on August 10, 1578. During the surrender, it is said that the castle lord, either Teru's father or brother, committed suicide, offering himself as a hostage to spare the lives of his soldiers. In the turmoil, Teru's brother, Kusihashi Masai, was defeated. With her husband missing and the fear of her son's death, Teru endured an anxious period alone. Teru's nephew was later pardoned and served the Kuroda clan.

=== Service under Toyotomi Hideyoshi ===
In the aftermath of his imprisonment from Itami, Kanbei continued being trusted vassal of Hideyoshi, becoming instrumental in his rise and the formalization of the Toyotomi clan. Kanbei would eventually be elevated as a daimyo with a domain of 120,000 koku in Chikuzen Province. Teru, like other daimyos' wives and children, moved to Osaka castle.

=== Sekigahara campaign (1600) ===
In anticipation of the Battle of Sekigahara, Ishida Mitsunari detained the daimyo's family as political hostages. In an effort to compel the Daimyos to align with their cause, Mitsunari's forces endeavored to abduct numerous family members of Daimyos who were present at Osaka. As a result, Hosokawa Gracia, the wife of Hosokawa Tadaoki, chose to end her own life. In the chaos that followed Gracia's death, and with the help of Toshiyasu Kuriyama, Tahei Mori, and other retainers, Teruhime was able to hide and escape. Teru and her family were rescued by Kanbei's retainers and escaped by boat to Nakatsu Castle.

=== Later life and death ===
Following her husband's death in 1604, Teru became a devout Pure Land Buddhist, entering the priesthood of the Jōdo-shū sect and establishing Eiko-in (later destroyed by fire). She also founded a sub-temple called Shōfuku-in at Hotoku-ji in Kyoto, which was later merged with the main temple due to relocation (though the graveyard remains). Her portrait, passed down through generations, is currently held at the Kyoto National Museum.

Teru died in 1627 in Chikuzen Province, Fukuoka. Her posthumous Buddhist name is "Shōfuku-in Denyo Kōe Daini-kō." Her graves can be found at Hotoku-ji (Kyoto), Sūfuku-ji (Fukuoka), and Eiko-in (Fukuoka).

== In popular culture ==
Teru is among the main characters of Gunshi Kanbei, the 53rd Taiga drama portraying the life of his husband. Miki Nakatani portrays her from young adulthood to her twilight years.
