= Takenaka clan =

Japanese familial line

Takenaka clan 竹中
- The emblem (mon) of the Takenaka clan
- Home province: Mino; Bungo
- Parent house: Minamoto clan Toki clan
- Titles: Various
- Founder: Takenaka Shigeuji

The Takenaka clan (Japanese: 竹中氏, Hepburn: Takenaka-shi) is a Japanese family descended from the Minamoto clan (Seiwa Genji) line's Toki branch.

== History ==
The family, with holdings in the Fuwa district of Mino Province, was founded by Iwate Shigeuji, who was the first to take the name Takenaka.

Perhaps most famed during the headship of the strategist Takenaka Shigeharu (Hanbei), the family became hatamoto under Tokugawa Ieyasu in the Edo era. Takenaka Shigekata, the family head in the Bakumatsu era, was a famous field commander during the Boshin War.

A branch of the Takenaka family was until 1634 daimyō of the Takada and then Funai Domains (Bungo Province), before having its lands returned to the Shogunate.
