= Mount Rai =

Mountain in Japan

- 雷山
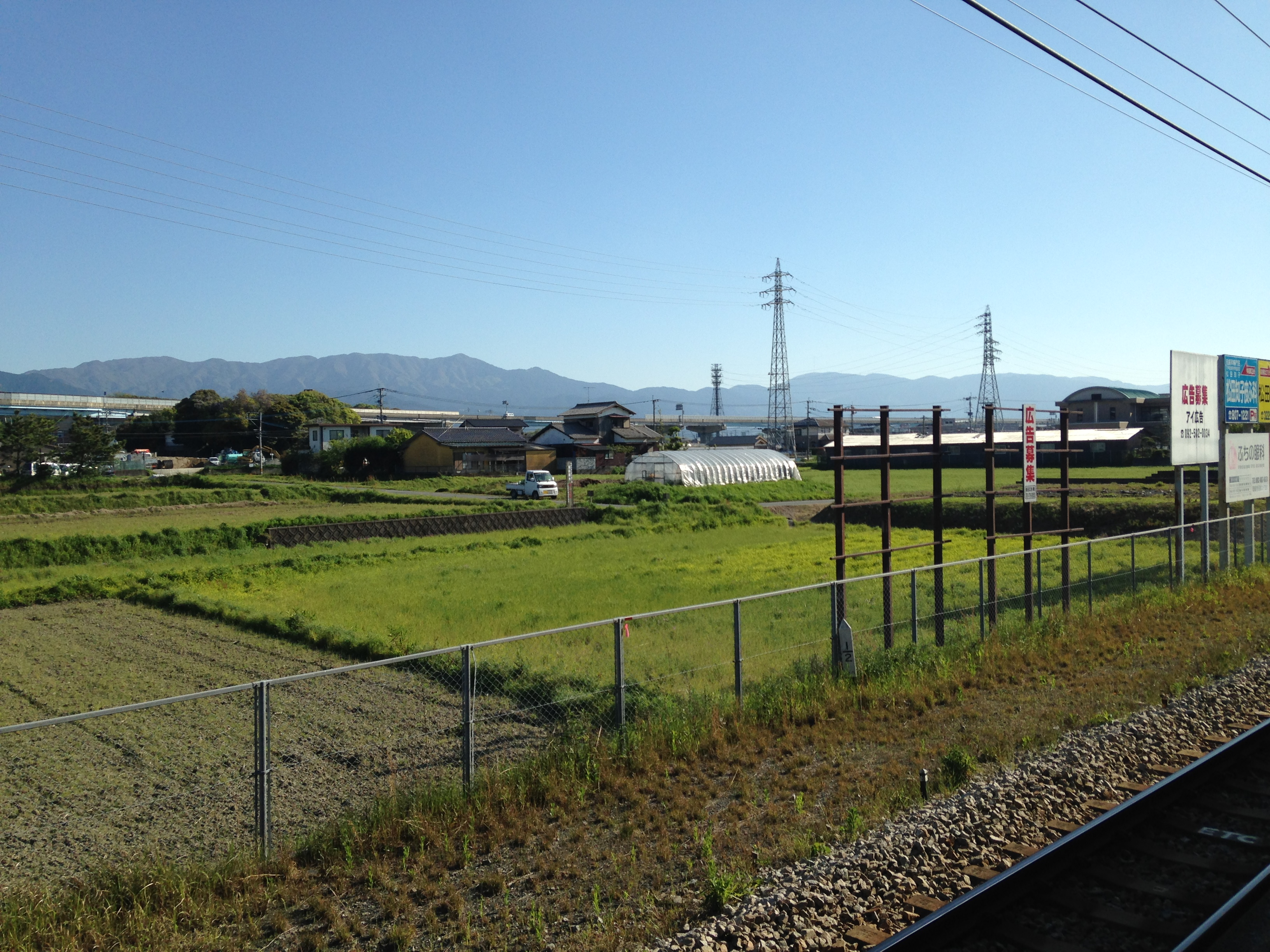
- A view of Mount Rai from Susenji Station platform

Highest point
- Elevation: 954.5 m (3,132 ft)
- Listing: List of mountains and hills of Japan by height
- Coordinates: 33°28′43″N 130°13′24″E

Naming
- Language of name: Japanese

Geography
- Location: On the border of Itoshima, Fukuoka Prefecture, and Saga, Saga Prefecture, Japan
- Parent range: Sefuri Mountains

Mount Rai (雷山, Rai-zan) is a 954.5 m (3,132 ft) mountain located on the border of Itoshima, Fukuoka Prefecture, and Saga, Saga Prefecture, Japan.

== Outline ==
This mountain is a part of the Sefuri Mountain range between Fukuoka Prefecture and Saga Prefecture. The peak is located on the Fukuoka Prefecture side of the mountain. The grassland that extends below the 950 meter summit is called as Sosogino (層々岐野), the place where the legendary of Empress Jingū still alive. The mountain has an alias name for Mount Sosogi (層々岐岳 Sosogi-dake) which is named after this field. The Ikazuchi-jinja jō-gu is located in the innermost part of the shrine grounds on the top of mountain. Since ancient times, the entire mountain is believed to be the holy mountain of Raijin, also called Raiden, a god of thunder and lightning in Japanese mythology. Therefore, it is said to be the name of this mountain.

== Facilities ==
- Sennyo-ji
- Ikazuchi-jinja
- Raizan Kōgoishi
- Fudō Falls, also known as "Seiga Waterfalls".

== Routes ==
The most popular route to climb this mountain is from Raizan Kannon-mae Bus Stop of Showa Bus. It takes about from one hour and forty minutes to the top.
