= Kuroda Bushi =

Japanese folk song from Fukuoka City

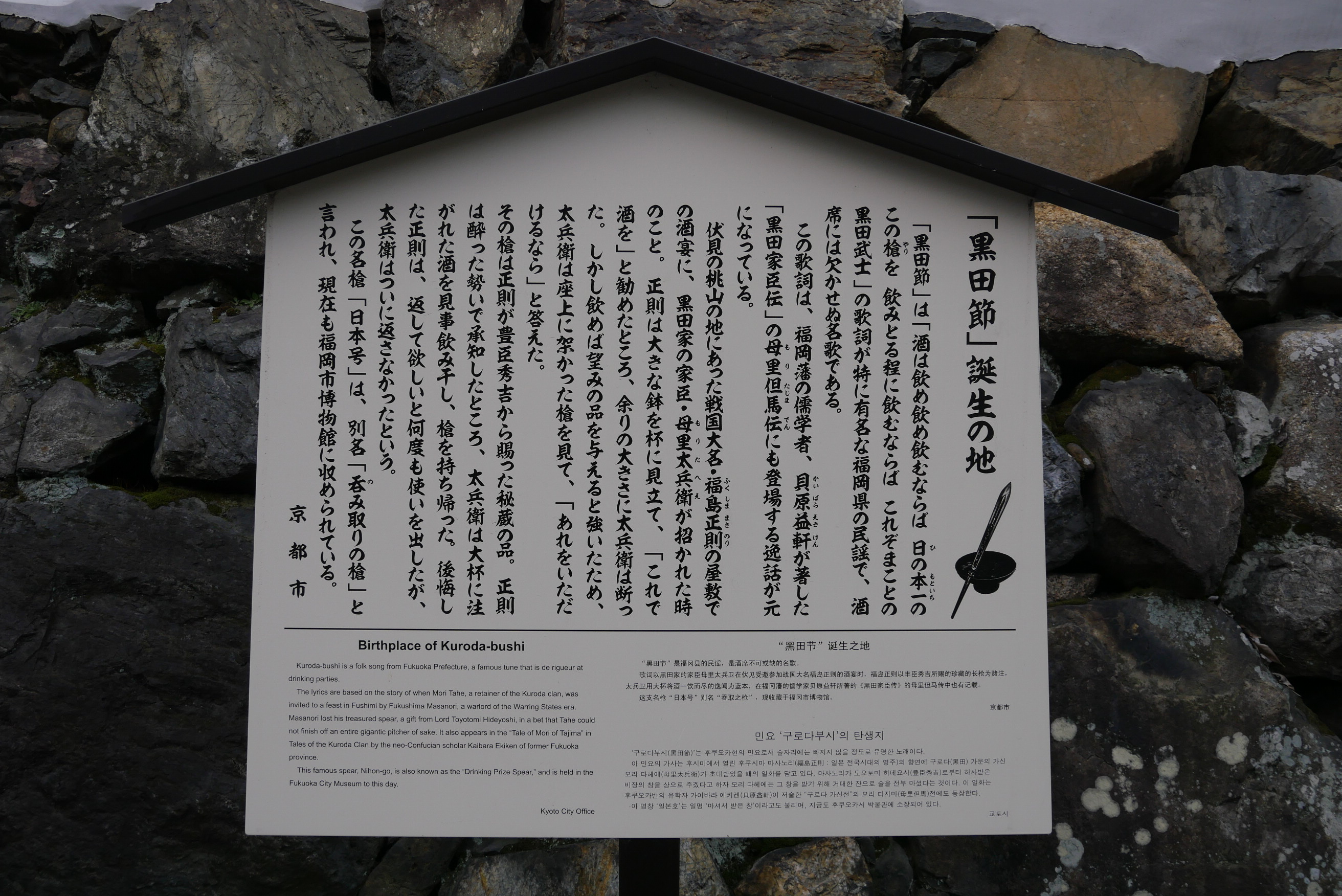
The plaque of the birthplace of Kuroda Bushi at the Gokogu Shrine (御香宮神社), Kyoto

Kuroda Bushi (Japanese: 黒田節, literally the tune of Kuroda), also known as Kuroda-bushi, is a folk song from Fukuoka City, Fukuoka Prefecture, Japan. This song, since its birth in the 1590s, has become popular across Japan, being sung now often at nomikai (drinking parties) or at karaoke.

== Words ==
The words of this song are in the form of a Japanese waka poem, that consists of seven- and five-syllable lines. There are several stanzas, of which the first stanza together with an English translation, is as follows:

Romanized Japanese

Kuroda-bushi
Sake wa nome, nome,
Nomu naraba,
Hi no moto ichino
Kono yari wo,
Nomitoru ho do ni
Nomu naraba,
Korezo makoto no
Kuroda bushi.

Direct English translation(GFDL)

Kuroda tune/ Kuroda's bushi
Sake, you drink it, drink it!
If you drink it,
Rising Sun's
Best lance, this,
You will get it;
If you can drink it all,
You'd be the best of
Kuroda's bushi!

== Origin ==
The researchers looking for the origin of the words of Kuroda-bushi have found it at the Gokō-gū Shrine (御香宮神社), in Kyoto. The music used in this song was from Chikuzen Imayō (Japanese: 筑前今様), a vocal genre sung by the bushi of Fukuoka Domain during the Edo period. The song then spread throughout Japan, drawing inspiration from the imperial music of Gagaku, especially the music tune called Etenraku.

== Story ==
One day, Nagamasa Kuroda, the daimyo of Kuroda Domain, asked Tomonobu Mori (Japanese: 母里友信), one of his vassals, to visit on business another vassal, Masanori Fukushima, who was known to be an alcoholic. As Mori was also a heavy drinker, Kuroda forbade him to drink during his visit, even if he were to be offered a drink, for fear that they would do something stupid under the influence of alcohol. When he arrived, Fukushima, already drunk as usual, happily welcomed a good drinking mate, and offered him a drink.

In spite of Mori's categorical refusal, Fukushima persisted in making him drink, saying "Doesn't Kuroda's bushi even drink this little cup of sake? If you accept my offer to drink together, I will give as a reward anything you want." To this, Mori, made up his mind and swallowed a large cup of sake admirably to the last drop, and asked Fukushima to give him Nihon-Gô Japanese: 日本号), known as one of the Three Great Spears of Japan, that the Shogun Toyotomi Hideyoshi had owned.

The next day, Fukushima realized what a grave error he had made, and immediately sent a vassal to Mori to get back the lance. Mori, of course, refused to return it. Later, Mori went on to fight gallantly with this lance in important battles, such the ones during the Japan's invasion of Korea, 1592–1598.

It is noted in this story that bushi is used in two ways: bushi, changed from fushi (Japanese: 節), which meas a "tune", and bushi (Japanese: 武士) a "samurai", as in Bushido. The Fukuoka Domain, which was ruled by the Kuroda family, was also affectionately called the Kuroda Domain.

The story is told in another similar story, which is now considered erroneous.

"Kuroda Bushi" Hakata dolls, traditional Japanese clay dolls, are available in Fukuoka as souvenirs.

== See also ==
- Kuroda Domain
- Drinking song
