= Kyoko Uchida =

Japanese free announcer (born 1976)

- 内田 恭子
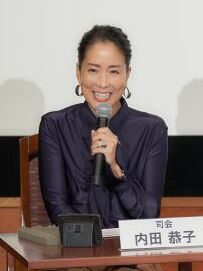
- Born: 9 June 1976 (age 50); Düsseldorf, Germany
- Other names: Kyoko Kimoto (real name); Ucchī
- Citizenship: Japan
- Education: Keio University College of Commerce
- Occupation: Announcer
- Years active: 1999–
- Known for: Former Fuji Television announcer
- Style: Sports; news; variety
- Television: Current; TV de Doitsu-go; Former; Tensai o tsukuru! Galileo Nō-ken; Sport!; Waratte Iitomo!; Tamori no Japonica Logos; Chikyū Kandō Haitatsunin: Hashire! Postman; Gout Temps Nouveau
- Spouse: Kimitoshi Kimoto (m. 2006)
- Website: Official website

Kyoko Uchida (内田 恭子, Uchida Kyōko; born 9 June 1976, in Düsseldorf, West Germany) is a Germany born-Japanese free announcer. She is a former announcer for Fuji Television. Her real name is Kyoko Kimoto (木本 恭子, Kimoto Kyoko) née Uchida (内田). She is nicknamed Ucchī (ウッチー). She grew up in Yokohama, Kanagawa Prefecture and Chicago. She graduated from Keio University College of Commerce.

== Awards ==
Year	Award
2002	18th FNS Announcement Grand Prize New Department Award

== Appearances in Fuji TV career ==
Year	Title
	FNS no Hi
1999	FNN Super News
1999	Waratte Iitomo!
	Serie A Digest
Sanma no Tengoku to Jigoku
2001	Sport!
2005	Hey! Spring of Trivia
	Pro Yakyū Chin Play Kō Play Taishō
2006	Mentore G
	Football CX

== Current appearances ==
Year	Title	Network
	Assist cafe Midori no Kotonoha	BS Asahi
2011	Hiru Bra	NHK-G
2011	Kurashi ni Yakudatsu! Kaden no Gakkō	BS Japan
2013	Kurashi no Gakkō: Motto Shiritai! Sumai to Kaden	BS Japan
2014	Shumi Do-raku	NHK-E
	Kyoko Uchida no Cocotte Cooking!	BS-TBS

== Former appearances ==
=== Television ===
Year	Title	Network	Ref.
2001	Junk Sports	Fuji TV	
2003	FNS 5000 Bangumi 10 Man-ri Sō Shutsuen Ganbatta Taishō	Fuji TV	
2005	Tamori no Japonica Logos	Fuji TV	
2006	Gout Temps Nouveau	KTV	
2008	Ikkakusenkin Yamawake Q! "Sekininsha wa Omaeda!"	ABC, TV Asahi	
2008	Chikyū Kandō Haitatsunin: Hashire! Postman	MBS, TBS	
2008	Shittoko!	MBS, TBS	
2009	Eigo de Shabera Night	NHK-G	
2009	Tensai o tsukuru! Galileo Nō-ken	TV Asahi	
2010	Sōdatta no ka! Akira Ikegami no Manaberu News	TV Asahi	
2010	Meringue no Kimochi	NTV	
2010	Nanikore Chinhyakkei	TV Asahi	
2010	Geinō-kai Dokkiri Jiten-me de Miru! Kotoba Show	YTV, NTV	
2011	Studio Park kara konnichiwa	NHK-G	
2011	TV de Doitsu-go	NHK-E	
2011	The Prime Show	WOWOW	
2014	Gunshi Kanbei	NHK-G	

=== Radio ===
Year	Title	Network
2006	Kyoko Uchida no Good Day Good Night	NBS
2007	Kyoko Uchida no Uchi koko: Uchi dake, Koko dake no Hanashi	Tokyo FM

=== Dubbing ===
Title	Role
Glee	Katie Couric

== Advertisements ==
Year	Title
	Nihon Minkan Hōsō Renmei "2004 Summer Olympics Campaign"
Shiseido Tsubaki "Joyū", "OL", "Shinshun"
Nissin Foods Gonbuto, Cup Noodle Light
2007	All Nippon Airways Chūgoku-sen Shūkō 20-shūnen
2007	Mitsubishi Motors, Kankyō Kōkoku Mitsubishi i-MiEV
2007	Daiichi Sankyo Healthcare "Pre-call Jizoku-sei Capsule"
2009	Kirin Brewery "Kirin: Koku no jikan"
2009	Jupiter Telecommunications "J:Com: Gaikoku Hito Press-hen, nobosetemasu (Kaigai)"
2011	Ad Council Japan "Ima, Watashi ga dekiru koto-Yobikake"
2015	Nivea-Kao "Nivea: Cream Care: Body Wash Tanjō"

== Serialisations ==
Title
"Kyoko Uchida no uttori-ottori Challenge"
"Kyoko Uchida to Kosei Takasu no Table Talk"

== Magazines ==
Year	Title
	Lee
Marion 21
United Airlines inflight magazine "Watashi no Taisetsu"
Biteki "Kyoko Uchida no Biteki × Chiteki Taidan"
2008	V.A.
	L'Occitane no Himitsu
Domani "3-Po sagatte Kuro Neko."

== Books ==
Year	Title
2007	Kyoko Uchida no yasashī omotenashi
2008	Chocolate to Inu to Bed

== See also ==
- Tamori (co-starred with in Waratte Iitomo!)
