= Kuroda clan =

Samurai clan prominent during the Sengoku period

Kuroda 黒田氏
- The emblem (mon) of the Koruda clan
- Home province: Ōmi
- Parent house: Sasaki
- Titles: Shugo; Daimyō
- Founder: Kuroda Takamune
- Current head: Nagataka Kuroda (1952–)
- Founding year: c. 15th century
- Dissolution: still extant

The Kuroda clan (Japanese: 黒田氏, Hepburn: Kuroda-shi) was a Japanese samurai clan which came to prominence during the Sengoku period.

== Origins ==
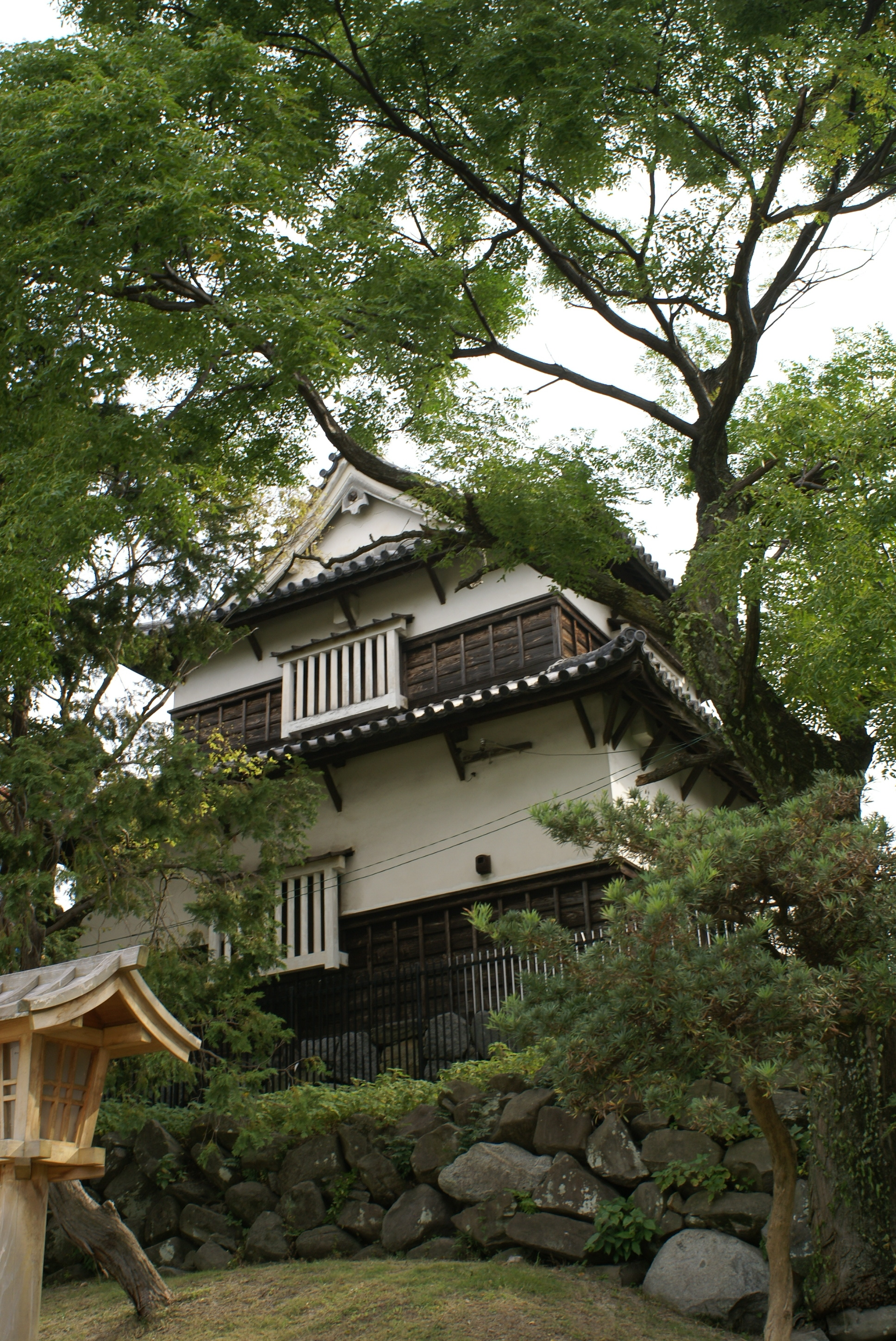
Corner tower of Fukuoka castle, residence of the Kuroda main clan during the Edo period

The Kuroda clan claimed its origins in Tōtōmi Province.

== Sengoku period ==
In the 16th century, the Kuroda clan was located in Harima Province. Under the headship of Kuroda Yoshitaka, the clan served the Oda and later Toyotomi clans. Yoshitaka specifically worked as a battle tactician, and was considered to be on par with Takenaka Shigeharu, another prominent tactician of the era. For his service, Yoshitaka received lordship of Nakatsu Castle, in 1587. In 1600, Yoshitaka and his son Kuroda Nagamasa took part in the Sekigahara Campaign on the side of Tokugawa Ieyasu. Yoshitaka was also a Roman Catholic with the baptismal name of "Don Simeon".

== Edo period ==
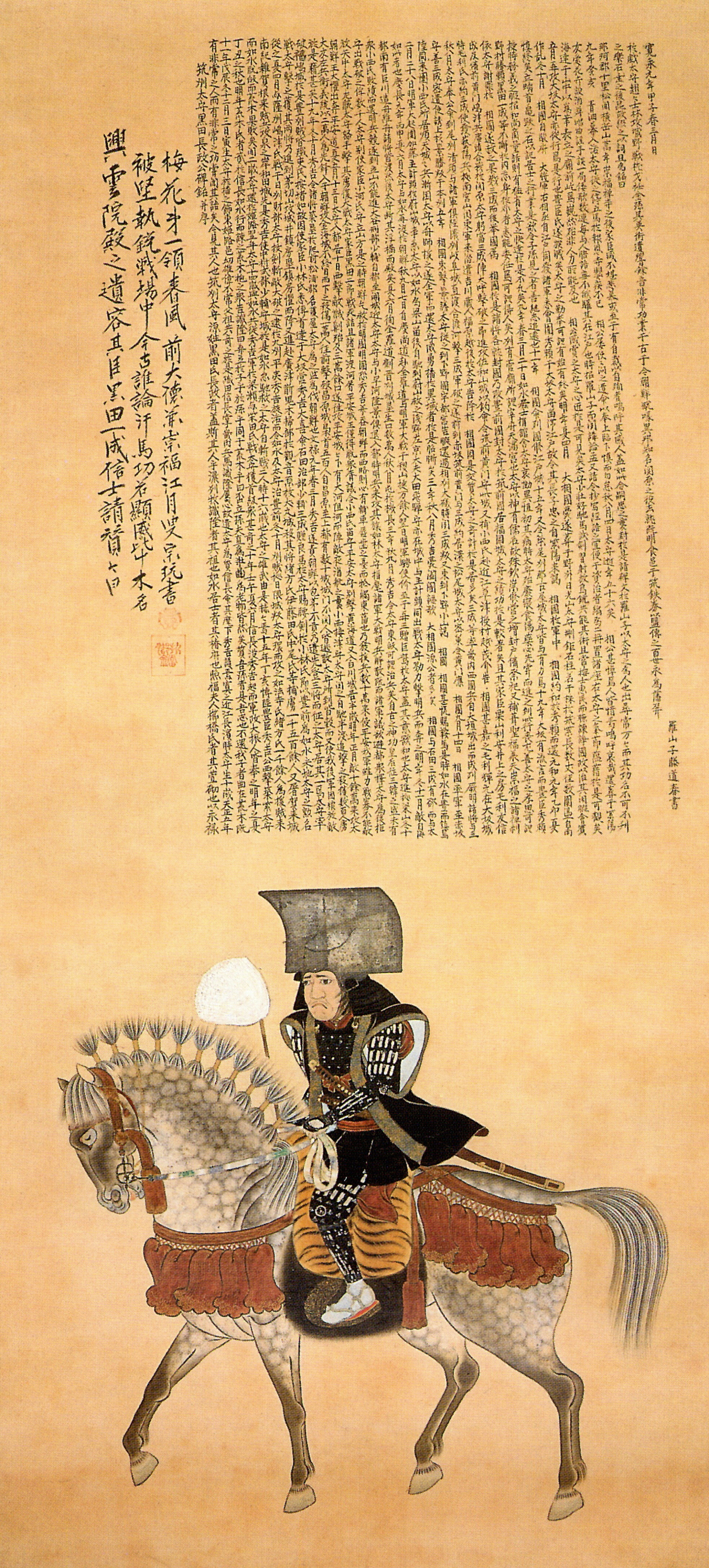
Kuroda Nagamasa on horseback

At the Battle of Sekigahara in 1600, Tokugawa Ieyasu's Eastern Army defeated Ishida Mitsunari's Western Army, and Ieyasu emerged as the dominant power figure in Japan. Kuroda Yoshitaka and his son Nagamasa supported Ieyasu in combat, and were rewarded for their service with a transfer to the Fukuoka Domain, rated at 520,000 koku of land.

Two branches of the family were founded in 1623. Kuroda Nagamasa's 3rd son Nagaoki founded the first; he was given 50,000 koku of land which became the Akizuki Domain. Nagamasa's fourth son Takamasa founded the second; he was given 40,000 koku of land which became the Tōren-ji Domain.

The forces of the Kuroda clan of Fukuoka took part in the Shimabara Rebellion in 1638. 18,000 men under Kuroda Tadayuki assisted in laying siege to Hara Castle.

In 1784, two schools were founded for the Fukuoka domain's samurai sons, Shūyū-kan and Kantō-kan. Of the two, Shūyū-kan still exists as Shūyū-kan Prefectural High School.

== Boshin war ==
During the Boshin War of 1868–69, the Kuroda clan supported the imperial government. Troops from Fukuoka took part in the Battle of Aizu and the Battle of Hakodate, among others.

== Key genealogies ==
Fukuoka

1. Kuroda Takamune
2. Kuroda Takamasa (d. 1523)
3. Kuroda Shigetaka (1508–1564)
4. Kuroda Mototaka (1524-1585)
5. Kuroda Yoshitaka (1546-1604)
6. Kuroda Nagamasa (1568-1623)
7. Kuroda Tadayuki (1602–1654)
8. Kuroda Mitsuyuki (1628–1707)
9. Kuroda Tsunamasa (1659–1711)
10. Kuroda Nobumasa (1685–1744)
11. Kuroda Tsugutaka (1703–1775)
12. Kuroda Haruyuki (1753–1781)
13. Kuroda Harutaka (1754–1782)
14. Kuroda Naritaka (1777–1795)
15. Kuroda Narikiyo (1795–1851)
16. Kuroda Nagahiro (1811–1887)
17. Kuroda Nagatomo (1839–1902)
18. Kuroda Nagashige (1867–1939)
19. Nagamichi Kuroda (1889–1978)
20. Nagahisa Kuroda (1916–2009)
21. Nagataka Kuroda (1952–)

Akizuki

- Kuroda Nagaoki (1610–1665)
- Kuroda Nagashige
- Kuroda Naganori
- Kuroda Nagasada
- Kuroda Nagakuni
- Kuroda Nagayoshi
- Kuroda Nagakata
- Kuroda Naganobu
- Kuroda Nagatsugu
- Kuroda Nagamoto
- Kuroda Nagayoshi
- Kuroda Naganori

Tōren-ji

- Kuroda Takamasa (1612–1639)
- Kuroda Yukikatsu (1634–1663)
- Kuroda Nagahiro (1659–1711)

(as Naogata domain)

- Kuroda Nagakiyo (1667–1720)
