= Takenaka Shigekata =

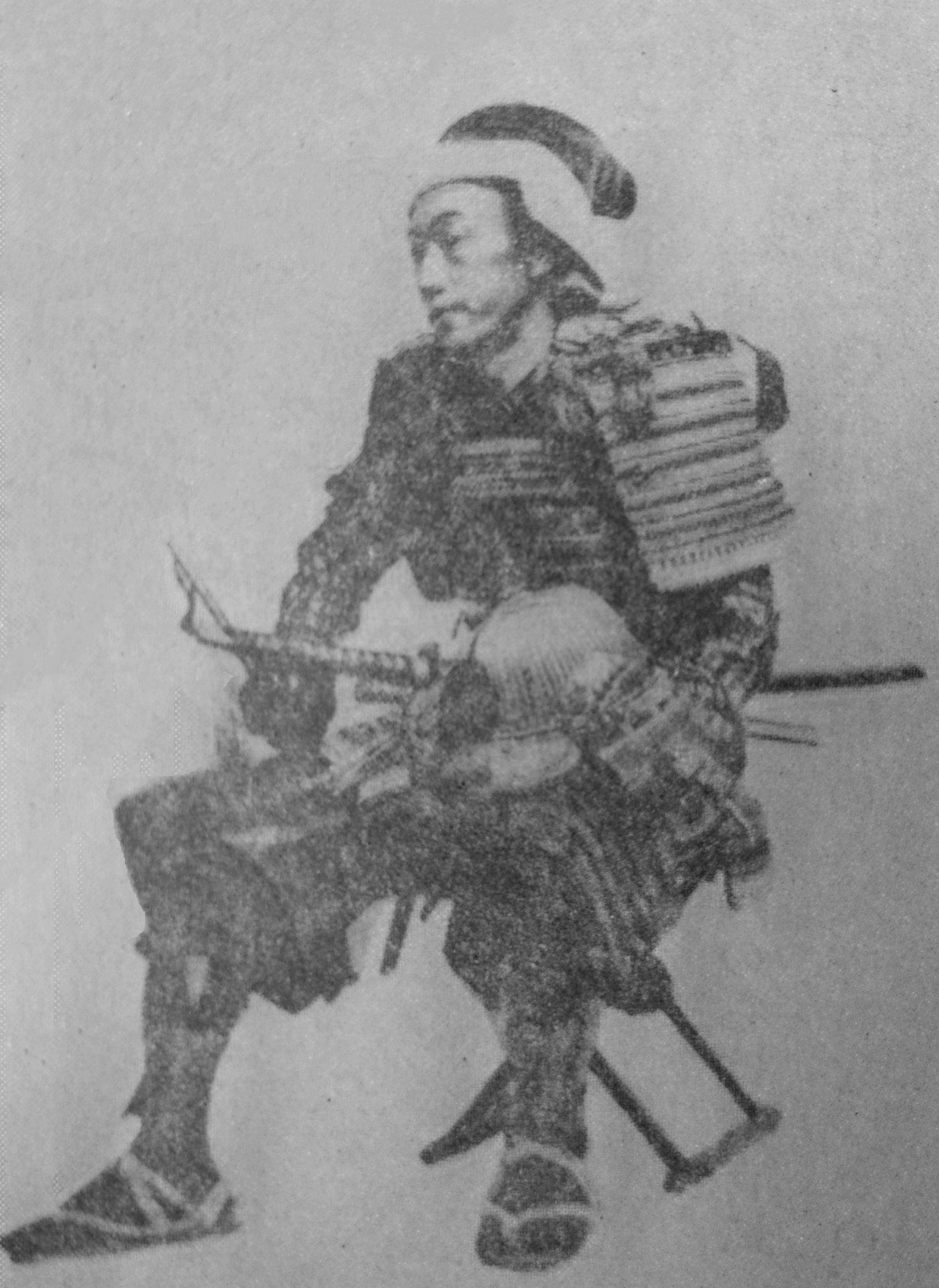
Takenaka Shigetaka

Takenaka Shigekata (竹中 重固; September 16, 1828– January 24, 1891) was a Japanese samurai of the late Edo period, later a figure in efforts to colonize Hokkaido. He is also known by his court title, Tango no kami (丹後守).

Takenaka Shigekata was born in 1828 in the town of Iwate, in Mino Province, the son of Tokugawa retainer Takenaka Motoyuki. Motoyuki, though the head of a branch house, was a descendant of the great Sengoku-era strategist Takenaka Hanbei Shigeharu . Following his father's death, Shigekata was adopted by Takenaka Shigeakira, the 5000 koku hatamoto who was head of the main Takenaka house. Though a senior hatamoto due to his rank, he entered the ranks of the Greater Guardsmen (Ōbangumi; 大御番組) in 1864. He later became an Army Magistrate, and took part in the campaign that put down the Tengutō. He also concurrently held the rank of wakadoshiyori.

In 1868, Takenaka was part of the force headed for the Fushimi bugyōsho, but was beaten back by the new Imperial Army. Returning to Edo as part of the Tokugawa withdrawal, he was singled out as a scapegoat for the defeat, and was stripped of his court rank and title, and prohibited from entering Edo Castle. Though he briefly entered the priesthood, he still wanted to fight the Imperial army, and so he formed the Junchūtai (純忠隊). He initially had tactical coordination with the Shogitai, but following the defeat at the Battle of Ueno, he led the unit northward (together with former roju Ogasawara Nagamichi and his men), engaging in guerilla warfare as he moved farther into Mutsu Province. Joining Enomoto Takeaki's fleet in Sendai, he traveled to Hokkaido, where he became a Judge Advocate General officer in the new Ezo Republic.

Just before the end of the Battle of Hakodate, he headed to Tokyo on a foreign steamship, ostensibly to find some unexplored option for fighting the Imperial Army; however, as he no longer had any solutions, he heeded his father Shigeakira's advice and surrendered. As punishment he forfeited his holdings, and was placed under the supervision of the Fukuoka domain. Later transferred to the guardianship of his father, he followed the latter to Hokkaido, where they settled. Moved by the plight of the impoverished former samurai there, Takenaka submitted a memorandum to the new government on the increase of agricultural productivity in Hokkaido. This reached the right ears, and he was pardoned in 1873, being allowed to return to Tokyo and work in the new government. However, in 1875, he left that post, and worked in the Hoeisha Company that his younger brother Motoyori had started, furthering the cause of increased productivity in Hokkaido.

Takenaka died in 1891 at the age of 63, and is buried Takanawa-Sengakuji Temple.
