= Kuroda Yoshitaka =

Daimyō of the late Sengoku and early Edo periods

- 黒田 孝高
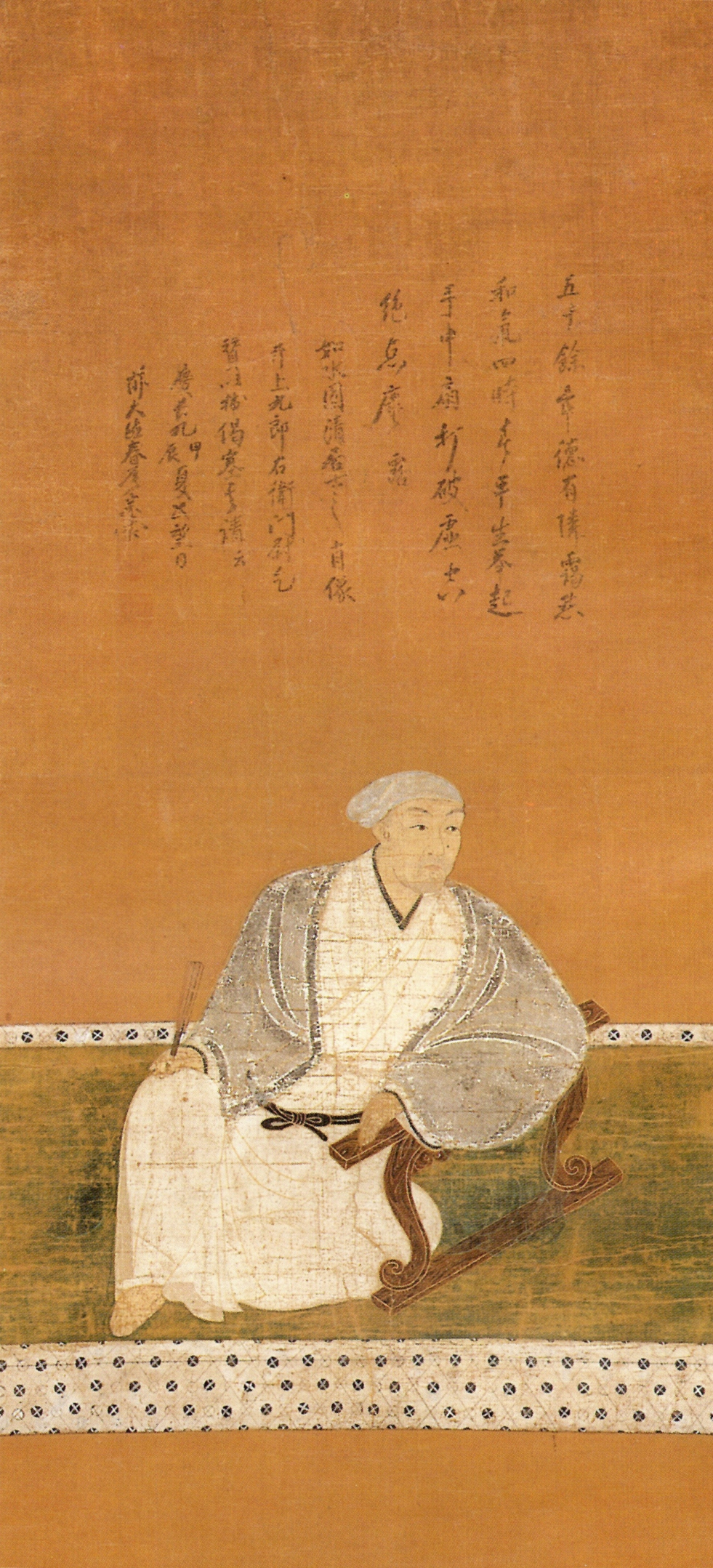

Head of Kuroda clan
- In office 1567–1604
- Preceded by: Kuroda Mototaka
- Succeeded by: Kuroda Nagamasa

Personal details
- Born: December 22, 1546 Himeji
- Died: March 20, 1604 (aged 57) Iizuka
- Spouse: Kushihashi Teru
- Parent: Kuroda Mototaka (father)
- Nickname: "Kambē"

Military service
- Allegiance: Oda clan Toyotomi clan Eastern Army; Tokugawa shogunate
- Rank: Daimyo
- Unit: Kuroda clan
- Battles/wars: Chūgoku Campaign; Siege of Miki; Siege of Tottori; Siege of Takamatsu; Battle of Yamazaki; Battle of Shizugatake; Battle of Komaki-Nagakute; Invasion of Shikoku; Kyushu Campaign; Battle of Ishigakibaru; Siege of Yanagawa

Kuroda Yoshitaka (黒田 孝高; December 22, 1546 – March 20, 1604), also known as Kuroda Kanbei (黒田 官兵衛; or Kuroda Kambē), was a Japanese samurai and daimyō of the late Sengoku through the early Edo period. Renowned as a man of great ambition, he succeeded Takenaka Hanbei as a chief strategist and adviser to Toyotomi Hideyoshi. Kuroda became a Christian when he was 38, and received "Simeon Josui" as a baptismal name (rekishijin). His quick wit, bravery, and loyalty were respected by his warriors.

== Early life ==
Kuroda Yoshitaka was born in Himeji (姫路) on December 22, 1546, as Mankichi (万吉), the son of Kuroda Mototaka. It is believed that the Kuroda originated from Ōmi Province. Yoshitaka's grandfather Shigetaka brought the family to Himeji and resided in Gochaku Castle (御着城), east of Himeji Castle.

Shigetaka served as a senior retainer of Kodera Masamoto, the lord of Himeji, and was so well thought of that Shigetaka's son Mototaka was allowed to marry Masamoto's adopted daughter (Akashi Masakaze's daughter) and use the Kodera name. Yoshitaka became the head of the Kuroda family at the age of 21 when his father, Mototaka, retired.

== Military life ==
=== Service under Nobunaga ===
In 1577, when Toyotomi Hideyoshi was spearheading the Oda clan's advance into the Chūgoku region, he pledged loyalty to the Oda. Yoshitaka, together with the sickly Takenaka Hanbei, served as Hideyoshi's strategist and assisted in the Chugoku campaign against the Mōri clan.

In 1578, the lord of Arioka/Itami Castle, Araki Murashige, concluded an alliance with the Mōri to revolt against the Oda. Kodera Masamoto also hatched a plot to cooperate with Araki. Yoshitaka went to Arioka castle to prevail on Araki not to defect, but Araki chose to imprison Yoshitaka instead. As a result, Nobunaga believed that Yoshitaka had defected to Araki's side and was furious, and Yoshitaka's son, Shōjumaru (later Kuroda Nagamasa), was sentenced to death by Nobunaga. However, he was saved by Takenaka Hanbei.

Araki's revolt eventually concluded in 1579 at the Siege of Itami, which resulted in Yoshitaka's rescue. Due to his long imprisonment (with lack of space for sleeping and sitting), Yoshitaka suffered a leg disorder and lost the eyesight in one eye for the rest of his life.

In 1582, he fought in the Siege of Takamatsu against the Mōri clan.

=== Service under Hideyoshi ===
Yoshitaka fought at the Battle of Yamazaki in 1582 under Hideyoshi, avenging the death of Oda Nobunaga.

He participated in the Battle of Shizugatake in 1583 and the Battle of Komaki-Nagakute in 1584. He also led Toyotomi forces in the campaign to conquer Shikoku in 1585.

Shortly before 1587, Yoshitaka was ordered by Hideyoshi to lead an attack on the Siege of Kagoshima at Kyushu. Along with him was the Christian daimyō Takayama Ukon. After seeing the thriving Christian population of Kyushu, under Ukon's influence, Yoshitaka chose to covert, and was baptized with the name ドン・シメオン (Dom Simeão = Don Simeon). Later, after a visit to the Jesuit-controlled port of Nagasaki, Hideyoshi became fearful of the powerful influence that Jesuits and the Christian daimyōs wielded.

In 1587, Hideyoshi made his famous edict expelling foreign missionaries and ordering all Christian samurai under his rule to abandon their faith. While Ukon resisted the edict and lost his status, Yoshitaka gave up his new religion and adopted a monk's habit, calling himself Josui (如水). Like Naitō Joan (who took his name from Portuguese João), it is believed that Yoshitaka chose his new name from "Josué", the Portuguese version of "Joshua".

Yoshitaka’s most prominent act during his short time as a Christian was his arrangement to save a Jesuit mission from Bungo when the Christian daimyō of that province, Ōtomo Sōrin, was under attack from the Shimazu clan.

=== Sekigahara campaign ===
Before the outbreak of the Sekigahara conflict between Tokugawa Ieyasu with Ishida Mitsunari, Yoshitaka and his son, Kuroda Nagamasa, made contact with Ii Naomasa, a Tokugawa general, and formed a pact of alliance. Through the Kuroda clan, Naomasa successfully swayed the other military commanders to support the Tokugawa clan. It was recorded that Yoshitaka and his son, Nagamasa, bore grudge towards Mitsunari due to their personal conflict with him over alleged mismanagements during the Japanese invasions of Korea (1592–1598).

In 1600, Yoshitaka was seemingly on the Tokugawa side during the Sekigahara campaign, having clashed against Ōtomo Yoshimune at the Battle of Ishigakibaru and also, having participated at the Siege of Yanagawa. It was recorded that the legendary swordsman Miyamoto Musashi participated in Ishigakibaru battle under the command of Yoshitaka.

There is theory that Yoshitaka instead aimed to conquer the entire region of Kyūshū for himself during the major commotion of the Sekigahara campaign, and he momentarily conquered seven of the island's provinces. However, despite the feat, he had to give up his plans due to Tokugawa Ieyasu's victory in the Battle of Sekigahara.

== Death ==
After moving to Chikuzen Province (today is part of Fukuoka Prefecture), the Kuroda built a new castle near Hakata-ku, and named it Fukuoka Castle (also known as Maizuru Castle or Seki Castle) which was completed in the early Edo period for tozama daimyō Kuroda Nagamasa.

After his son Kuroda Nagamasa succeeded him, Yoshitaka died on April 19, 1604. His grave is in the Namazuta area of Iizuka, Fukuoka, near the original site of Namazuta Castle.

== Family ==
- Father: Kuroda Mototaka
- Mother: Akashi Masakaze's daughter (1532–1560)
- Wife: Kushihashi Teru (1553–1627)
- Sons (all by Kushihashi Teru):
  - Kuroda Nagamasa (1568 - 1623, also known as Shoujumaru in childhood)
  - Kuroda Kumanosuke (1582–1597)
- Adopted sons:
  - Kuroda Kazushige (1571–1656)

== Relationship with Hideyoshi ==
As depicted in historical writings and contemporary television, it is suggested that Yoshitaka was feared by Hideyoshi, despite his attempts to hide his intelligence and influence. It is alleged that Hideyoshi's fear was due to his overwhelming debt to Yoshitaka, with Yoshitaka having helped him reign over the whole country as his shadow strategist. Hideyoshi even believed that Yoshitaka might overthrow him eventually. In addition, Yoshitaka had a close friendship with Sen no Rikyū - known as the founder of the Japanese tea ceremony "wabi-cha", who was later put to death by Hideyoshi himself.

== Personality ==
Yoshitaka was a frugal person, who sold used military equipment and personal belongings to his vassals. He saved enough money to pay mercenaries in the Sekigahara War due to his thrifty mind. His last words were, "Do not try to gain other people's favor and do not wish for wealth." He was also involved in the project to build principal castles: Himeji Castle, Nagoya Castle, Osaka Castle, and Hiroshima Castle under the reign of the Toyotomi lords.

== Popular culture ==
- In the Sengoku Basara games and anime, Yoshitaka is seen with chains attached to a metal ball around his hands, and running gags occur when he is near to unlocking his chains.
- He is a playable character in the video games Samurai Warriors 3 & 4, seen with pale skin and a jade orb as his weapons.

== See also ==
- Eiji Yoshikawa, historical fiction
- Gunshi Kanbei, the 2014 NHK taiga drama

== Appendix ==
=== Bibliography ===
- Noda, Hiroko (2007). "徳川家康天下掌握過程における井伊直政の役割" [The role of Ii Naomasa in the process of Tokugawa Ieyasu taking control of the country]. 彦根城博物館研究紀要. 18. Hikone Castle Museum.
- Ryōtarō Shiba Harimanada monogatari 播磨灘物語, 1975 vol1~4 Kodansha ISBN 978-4062739320~ISBN 978-4062739351
- Andō Hideo 安藤英男. Shiden Kuroda Josui 史伝黒田如水. Tokyo: Nichibō Shuppansha, 1975.
- Harada Tanemasa 原田種眞. Kuroda Josui 黒田如水. Tokyo: Benseisha 勉誠社, 1996.
- Kaneko Kentarō 金子堅太郎. Kuroda Josui den 黒田如水伝. Tokyo: Bunken Shuppan 文献出版, 1976.
- Motoyama Kazuki 本山一城. Jitsuroku Takenaka Hanbei to Kuroda Kanbei 実錄竹中半兵衛と黒田官兵衛. Tokyo: Murata Shoten 村田書店, 1988.
- Yoshikawa, Eiji. (1989) Yoshikawa Eiji Rekishi Jidai Bunko (Eiji Yoshikawa's Historical Fiction), Vol. 44: Kuroda Yoshitaka (黒田如水). Tokyo: Kodansha. ISBN 978-4-06-196577-5
