= Kuroda Nagamasa =

Japanese samurai and daimyō (1568–1623)

- 黒田 長政
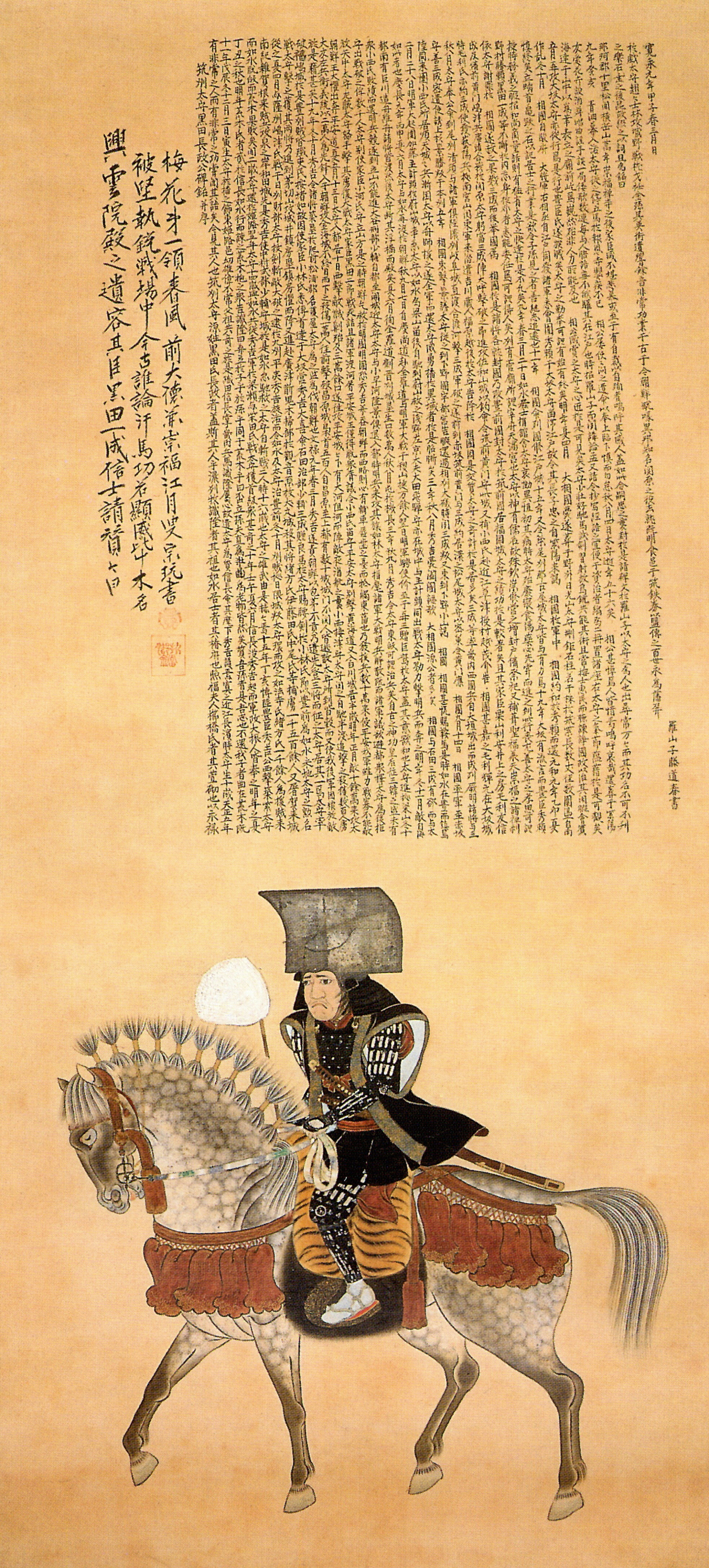

Head of Kuroda clan
- In office 1604–1623
- Preceded by: Kuroda Yoshitaka
- Succeeded by: Kuroda Tadayuki

Daimyō of Fukuoka
- In office 1601–1623
- Succeeded by: Kuroda Tadayuki

Personal details
- Born: December 3, 1568 Himeji, Harima Province, Japan
- Died: August 29, 1623 (aged 54)
- Spouse(s): Itohime; Eihime/Dairyo-in (second legal wife)
- Parents: Kuroda Yoshitaka (father); Kushihashi Teru (mother)

Military service
- Allegiance: Toyotomi clan Eastern Army; Tokugawa shogunate
- Rank: Daimyo
- Unit: Kuroda clan
- Battles/wars: Battle of Shizugatake (1583); Korean campaign (1592-1598); Battle of Sekigahara (1600); Siege of Osaka (1614-1615)

Kuroda Nagamasa (黒田 長政; December 3, 1568 – August 29, 1623) was a Japanese samurai and daimyō of the late Azuchi–Momoyama and early Edo periods. He was the son of Kuroda Kanbei, who served as a chief strategist and adviser to Toyotomi Hideyoshi. Nagamasa is best known for his role as the first lord of Fukuoka Domain in Chikuzen Province and for his participation in major military campaigns, including the Battle of Sekigahara (1600), where he supported Tokugawa Ieyasu, contributing to the establishment of the Tokugawa shogunate.

== Biography ==
Nagamasa's childhood name was Shojumaru (松寿丸). In 1577 his father was tried and sentenced as a spy by Oda Nobunaga. Nagamasa was kidnapped and nearly killed as a hostage, but was rescued by Takenaka Hanbei. After Nobunaga was killed in the Honnō-ji Incident in 1582, Nagamasa served Toyotomi Hideyoshi along with his father and participated in the invasion of Chūgoku.

In 1583 Nagamasa participated in the Battle of Shizugatake.

In 1587, Nagamasa subdued Takarabe castle in Hyuga during Kyūshū campaign. During the campaign Ki Shigefusa, a local daimyo, responded to Hideyoshi's orders ambivalently, incurring Hideyoshi's anger.

On April 20, 1588, Nagamasa invited Shigefusa to Nakatsu Castle with the pretence of hospitality. Shigefusa entered Nakatsu Castle with a few companions and was assassinated by Nagamasa's order while drinking. Nagamasa then dispatched soldiers to Gogen-ji Temple, ordering them to kill the Ki clan's vassals. Nagamasa's forces captured the Ki clan's castle, and killing Shigefusa's father, Ki Nagafusa. Following this, Nagamasa executed his hostage, Tsuruhime, along with 13 maids by crucifixion at Senbonmatsukawara in Hirotsu, on the banks of the Yamakuni River.

In 1589, Kuroda Yoshitaka retired as head of Kuroda clan, and Nagamasa inherited the family lordship. During this time, Hideyoshi expelled Christian missionaries, and Nagamasa, who was a Christian like his father, renounced his faith.

=== Korean campaign ===
Nagamasa participated in Hideyoshi's Korean campaign, commanding the army's 3rd Division of 5,000 men during the first invasion (1592–1593). On 15 July, following the Battle of Imjin River, Nagamasa led his forces west into Hwanghae Province, participating in the first Siege of Pyongyang. After a sally from Korean forces inflicted heavy losses, Nagamasa launched counterattacks to push the Koreans into a river that protected the city. As the Korean forces retreated upstream where the river was shallow enough to cross, Japanese forces followed their trail, discovering a way to reach the city without crossing the deep river. Before entering the city, Nagamasa and Konishi Yukinaga sent scouts ahead. Confirming the city had been abandoned by the defenders, Nagamasa and Japanese forces entered the city, securing food supplies from the warehouses. On 16 October 1597, Nagamasa arrived at Jiksan, clashing against 6,000 Ming soldiers in the Battle of Jiksan. After dusk, the battle ended without a clear result. Later, Nagamasa launched a night raid using a crane formation pincer attack to crush enemy forces from each end. However, this raid failed and resulted in a rout that was joined by 2,000 Ming cavalry. During the first Korean campaign, Nagamasa, along with other Japanese generals, mounted a genocidal operation called Nadegiri in Jeolla Province, systematically mutilating victims and collecting noses of Koreans they killed.

In the second part of the campaign (1597–1598), he held command in The Army of the Right. At this time, Nagamasa participated in the first defense of Ulsan, leading reinforcements for Katō Kiyomasa with 600 men.

During his tenure in the Korean campaign, a famous anecdote attributed to Katō Kiyomasa recounts Nagamasa hunting a tiger during his free time. Recent research revealed that this was falsely attributed to Kiyomasa, while it actually applied to Nagamasa.

=== Ishida Mitsunari incident ===
According to popular belief, in 1598, after the death of Toyotomi Hideyoshi, the government of Japan had an incident when seven military generals consisting of Fukushima Masanori, Katō Kiyomasa, Ikeda Terumasa, Hosokawa Tadaoki, Asano Yoshinaga, Katō Yoshiaki, and Kuroda Nagamasa planned a conspiracy to kill Ishida Mitsunari. The supposed motivation for the conspiracy was dissatisfaction towards Mitsunari, who had written poor assessments and underreported the achievements of those generals during the Imjin war. Despite classical historiography depicting the event as "seven generals who conspired against Mitsunari", many more generals were involved, including Hachisuka Iemasa, Tōdō Takatora, and Kuroda Yoshitaka who brought their troops and entourages to confront Mitsunari.

The generals gathered at Kiyomasa's mansion in Osaka Castle. From there, they moved into Mitsunari's mansion. When Mitsunari learned of this from Jiemon Kuwajima, a servant of Toyotomi Hideyori, he fled to hide in Satake Yoshinobu's mansion with Shima Sakon and others. When the generals found that Mitsunari had fled, they searched the mansions of other feudal lords in Osaka Castle, while Kato's army approached the Satake residence. During this time, Mitsunari and his party escaped the Satake residence, barricading themselves at Fushimi Castle. Learning of Mitsunari's location the following day, the generals surrounded Fushimi Castle. Tokugawa Ieyasu, responsible for political affairs in Fushimi Castle, attempted to arbitrate the situation. The generals demanded Ieyasu hand over Mitsunari, which Ieyasu refused. Ieyasu then negotiated a compromise to allow Mitsunari retire, and for a review of the assessment of the Battle of Ulsan Castle. He had his second son, Yūki Hideyasu, escort Mitsunari to Sawayama Castle. This was a legal conflict between the generals and Mitsunari, rather than a conspiracy to murder him. Ieyasu's role to mediate complaints, rather than physically protect Mitsunari from harm.

Nevertheless, historians view this incident as an extension of political rivalries between the Tokugawa faction and the anti-Tokugawa faction led by Mitsunari. Since this incident, those military figures who were on bad terms with Mitsunari would later support Ieyasu during the conflict of Sekigahara between the Eastern army led by Tokugawa Ieyasu and the Western army led by Ishida Mitsunari. Muramatsu Shunkichi, writer of "The Surprising Colors and Desires of the Heroes of Japanese History and Violent Women", assessed that Mitsunari's failure against Ieyasu was due to unpopularity among major political figures.

=== Battle Of Sekigahara ===
As the Sekigahara Campaign broke out, Nagamasa sided with the Eastern Army led by Ieyasu.

On August 21, The Eastern Army Alliance attacked Takegahana castle, which was defended by Oda Hidenobu, a Mitsunari faction ally. The Eastern Army split into two groups, with 18,000 soldiers led by Ikeda Terumasa and Asano Yoshinaga dispatched to the river crossing, while 16,000 soldiers led by Nagamasa, Fukushima Masanori, Hosokawa Tadaoki, Kyogoku Kochi, Ii Naomasa, Katō Yoshiaki, Tōdō Takatora, Tanaka Yoshimasa, and Honda Tadakatsu headed downstream at Ichinomiya. The group led by Terumasa crossed Kiso River and battled at Yoneno, routing Hidenobu forces. Elsewhere, Takegahana castle was reinforced by Sugiura Shigekatsu, a Western Army faction general. The Eastern Army group led by Nagamasa and others crossed the river and directly attacked Takegahana Castle at 9:00 AM on August 22. As a final act of defiance, Shigekatsu himself set the castle on fire and committed suicide.

On September 14, the Mōri clan of the Western Army, via their vassal Kikkawa Hiroie, colluded with the Eastern Army and promised the Mōri clan would change sides during battle, on the condition that they would be pardoned after the war ended. Correspondences between the Mōri clan and the Eastern Army involved Hiroie representing the West, with Nagamasa and his father as representatives of the East. During these discussions they promised to pardon Hiroie and the Mōri clan.

On October 21, Nagamasa participated in the Battle of Sekigahara on Tokugawa Ieyasu's side. At the final phase of the battle, with the Eastern Army victorious, Nagamasa directed his attention towards Shima Sakon. As a result, Sakon was fatally wounded by a round from an arquebus; securing part of the Eastern Army's eventual victory. As a reward for his performance in the battle, Ieyasu granted Nagamasa Chikuzen – 520.000 koku – in exchange for his previous fief of Nakatsu in Buzen.

In 1612, Nagamasa went to Kyoto with his eldest son Kuroda Tadayuki, and Tadayuki was given the surname Matsudaira by Tokugawa Hidetada, the second shogun of the Edo shogunate.

Later in 1614–1615, he participated in the Osaka Castle campaigns.

== Personal life ==
Kuroda Nagamasa possessed Dō (Japanese armor), traditionally simple on its body pieces. However, Nagamasa's armor is notable for two Kabuto helmets. One has a unique wave-like ornament named ichi-no-tani. The other features buffalo horn shaped ornaments.

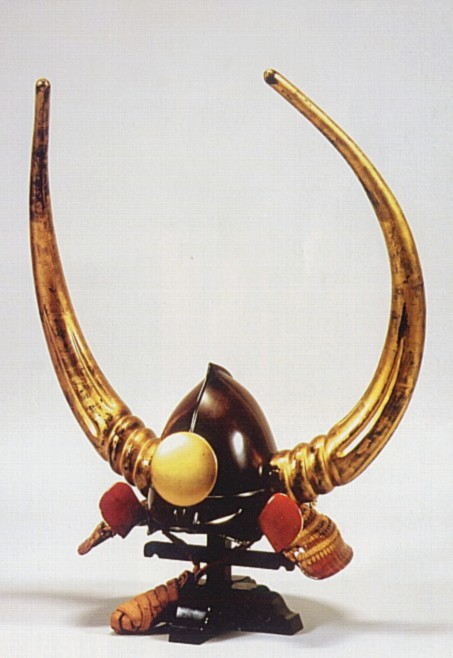
Black lacquered peach-shaped buffalo horns helmet or momonari kabuto owned by Kuroda Nagamasa; Fukuoka City Museum collection

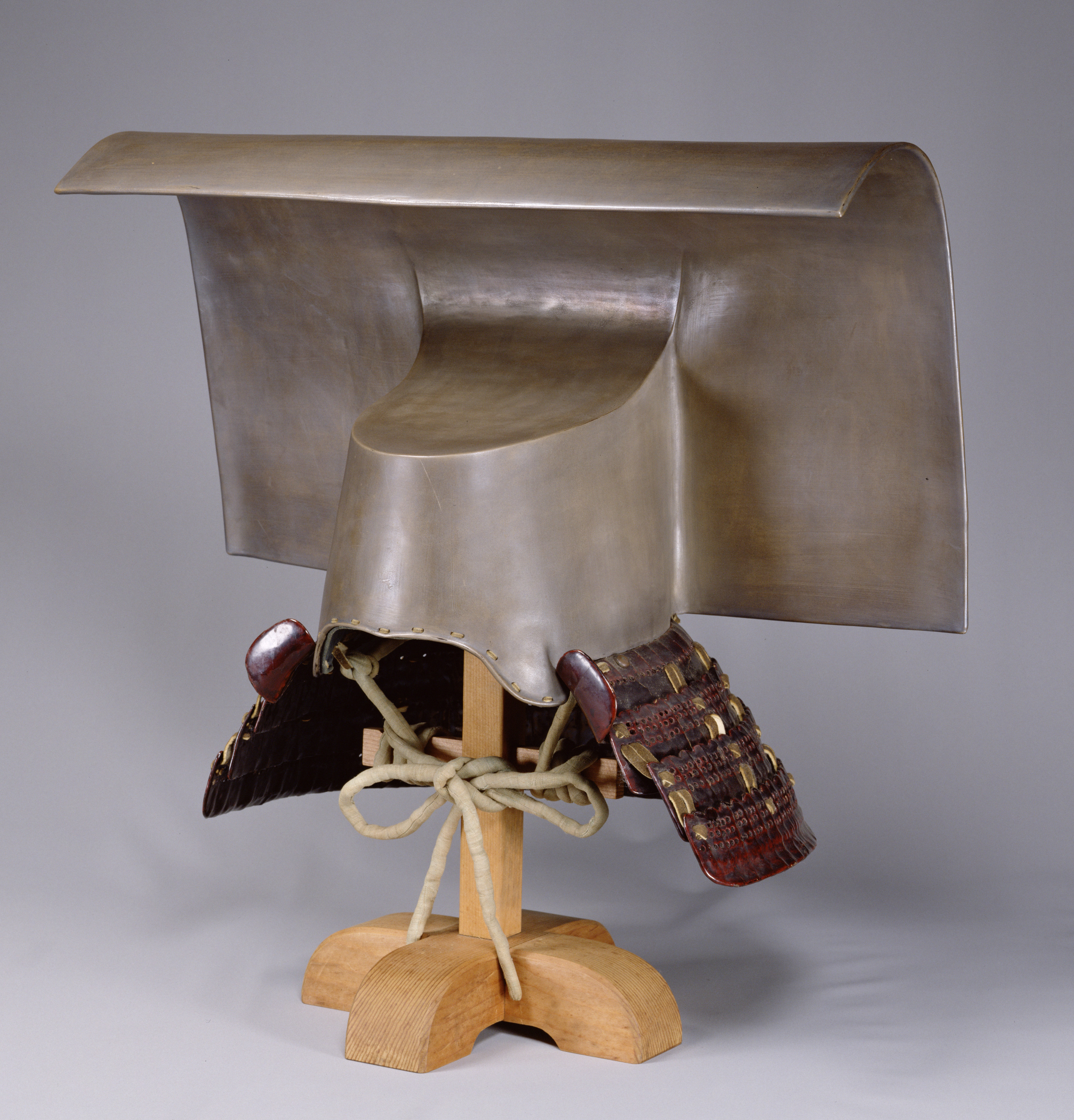
ichi-no-tani style helmet of Kuroda Nagamasa

=== Family ===
- Father: Kuroda Yoshitaka
- Mother: Kushihashi Teru (1553–1627)
- Wives:
  - Itohime (1571–1645)
  - Eihime (1585–1635)
- Concubine: Choshu'in
- Children:
  - Kikuhime married Inoue Yukifusa's son by Itohime
  - Kuroda Tadayuki (1602–1654) by Eihime
  - Tokuko married Sakakibara Tadatsugu by Eihime
  - Kameko married Ikeda Teruoki by Eihime
  - Kuroda Nagaoki (1610–1665) by Eihime
  - Kuroda Masafuyu by Choshu'in
  - Kuroda Takamasa (1612–1639) by Eihime

== In popular culture ==
Nagamasa is a playable character from the Eastern Army in the original Kessen.

Kuroda is also a popular historical figure. His life, and his relationship to Tokugawa, has been dramatized many times in the annual NHK Taiga Drama series.

- Taikoki (1965)
- Hara no Sakamichi (1971)
- Ougon no Hibi (1978)
- Onna Taikoki (1981)
- Tokugawa Ieyasu (1983)
- Kasuga no Tsunobe (1989)
- Hideyoshi (1996)
- Aoi Tokugawa Sandai (2000)
- Komyo ga Tsuji (2006)
- Gunshi Kanbei (2014)

Preceded by none	Daimyō of Fukuoka; 1601–1623	Succeeded by Kuroda Tadayuki
