= Kuroda Mototaka =

Samurai (1524–1585)

- 黒田職隆

Head of Kuroda clan
- In office ?–1567
- Preceded by: Kuroda Shigetaka
- Succeeded by: Kuroda Yoshitaka

Personal details
- Born: September 15, 1524 Fukuoka, Okayama Province, Japan
- Died: August 22, 1585 (aged 61)

Military service
- Allegiance: Kuroda clan

Kuroda Mototaka (黒田職隆; September 15, 1524 – August 22, 1585) also known as Kuroda Souen, was a samurai during the sengoku period He was the father of Kuroda Kanbei. Shigetaka served as a senior retainer of Kodera Masamoto, the lord of Himeji.

== Family ==
- Father: Kuroda Shigetaka (1508–1564)
- Mother: Matsutaka Zen’ni
- Wives:
  - Akashi Masakaze's daughter (1532-1560)
  - Kanki-dono (d.1582)
- Concubine: Mori-dono
- Children:
  - Kuroda Yoshitaka by Akashi Masakaze's daughter
  - Kuroda Toshitaka (1554-1596) by Akashi Masakaze's daughter
  - Kaneyama Myoshun (1555-1626) married Miki Seikan by Akashi Masakaze's daughter
  - Akiyama Myoen (1556-1619) married Onoue Takenori by Akashi Masakaze's daughter
  - Kuroda Toshinori (1561-1612) by Kanki-dono
  - Kuroda Naoyuki (1565-1609) by Mori-dono
  - Daughter (1559-1617) married Hitotsuyanagi Naosue by Mori-dono
