= Takenaka Shigeharu =

Japanese samurai (1544–1579)

- 竹中 重治
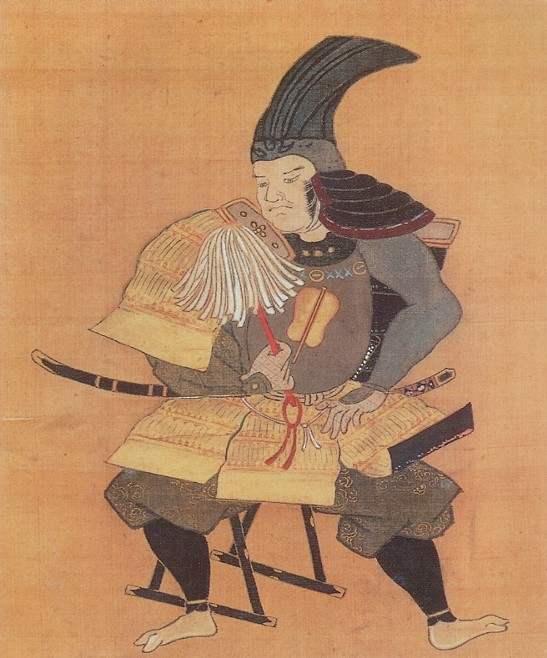
- Takenaka Shigeharu

Head of Takenaka clan
- In office 1560–1579
- Preceded by: Takenaka Shigemoto
- Succeeded by: Takenaka Shigekado

Personal details
- Born: September 27, 1544 Mino province
- Died: July 6, 1579 (aged 34)
- Children: Takenaka Shigekado
- Relatives: Takenaka Shigetoshi (cousin); Ando Morinari (father in law)
- Nickname: "Hanbei" (半兵衛)

Military service
- Allegiance: Saitō clan Oda clan
- Unit: Takenaka clan
- Battles/wars: Battle of Nagaragawa (1556); Siege of Inabayama (1567); Battle of Anegawa (1570); Chūgoku Campaign (1576); Siege of Miki (1579)

Takenaka Shigeharu (竹中 重治; September 27, 1544 – July 6, 1579), who was also known as Hanbei (半兵衛), was a Japanese samurai during the Sengoku period of the 16th century. Hanbei was the castle lord in command of Bodaiyama Castle. He was a chief strategist and adviser of Toyotomi Hideyoshi. His father was Takenaka Shigemoto, a local samurai. He initially served the Saitō clan of Mino Province, but later plotted an uprising and took over the Saitō clan's Gifu Castle.

== Biography ==
Shigeharu was born in 1544 as the son of Takenaka Shigemoto, the lord of Ōmidō Castle in the Ōno District of Mino Province and a retainer of the Mino-Saitō clan.

In 1556, Shigeharu had his first battle at the Battle of Nagaragawa. He allied with Saitō Dōsan, and replaced his father as the commander in chief against Saitō Yoshitatsu.

In 1560, after the death or retirement of Shigemoto, Shigeharu succeeded him as head of the family and became the lord of Bodaisan Castle.

In 1561, after the death of Yoshitatsu, Shigeharu served Yoshitatsu's son and heir, Saitō Tatsuoki, who took over at the age of thirteen. Tatsuoki, however, indulged in a decadent lifestyle and did not pay attention to affairs of governance. As a result, in 1564, Shigeharu joined the Mino Triumvirate in attacking Tatsuoki at Inabayama Castle, killing Saitō Hida-no-kami and causing Tatsuoki to flee. Later, Shigeharu returned the castle to Tatsuoki and went into seclusion.

In 1567, during the Siege of Inabayama Castle, Shigeharu then directed the defense against the forces of Oda Nobunaga. Eventually, Tatsuoki was driven out of Inabayama Castle. After the castle fell, he left the Saitō family, and served as a guest commander under Azai Nagamasa.

In 1570, Shigeharu joined the Oda clan, participating at the Battle of Anegawa in forces led by Andō Morinari, his father in law. After battle, Nobunaga ordered Shigeharu to stay in Yokoyama Castle along with Hideyoshi. Hideyoshi was so impressed by him that he invited Shigeharu to join his forces as a strategist.

Later in 1576, he joined Hideyoshi and followed Hideyoshi in the Chūgoku Campaign. Shigeharu made many contributions to Hideyoshi with his talents.

In 1579, he died of illness during Hideyoshi's attack against the Mōri in the Chūgoku region of Japan, while Miki Castle was besieged. Later, he was succeeded by Kuroda Yoshitaka as strategist.

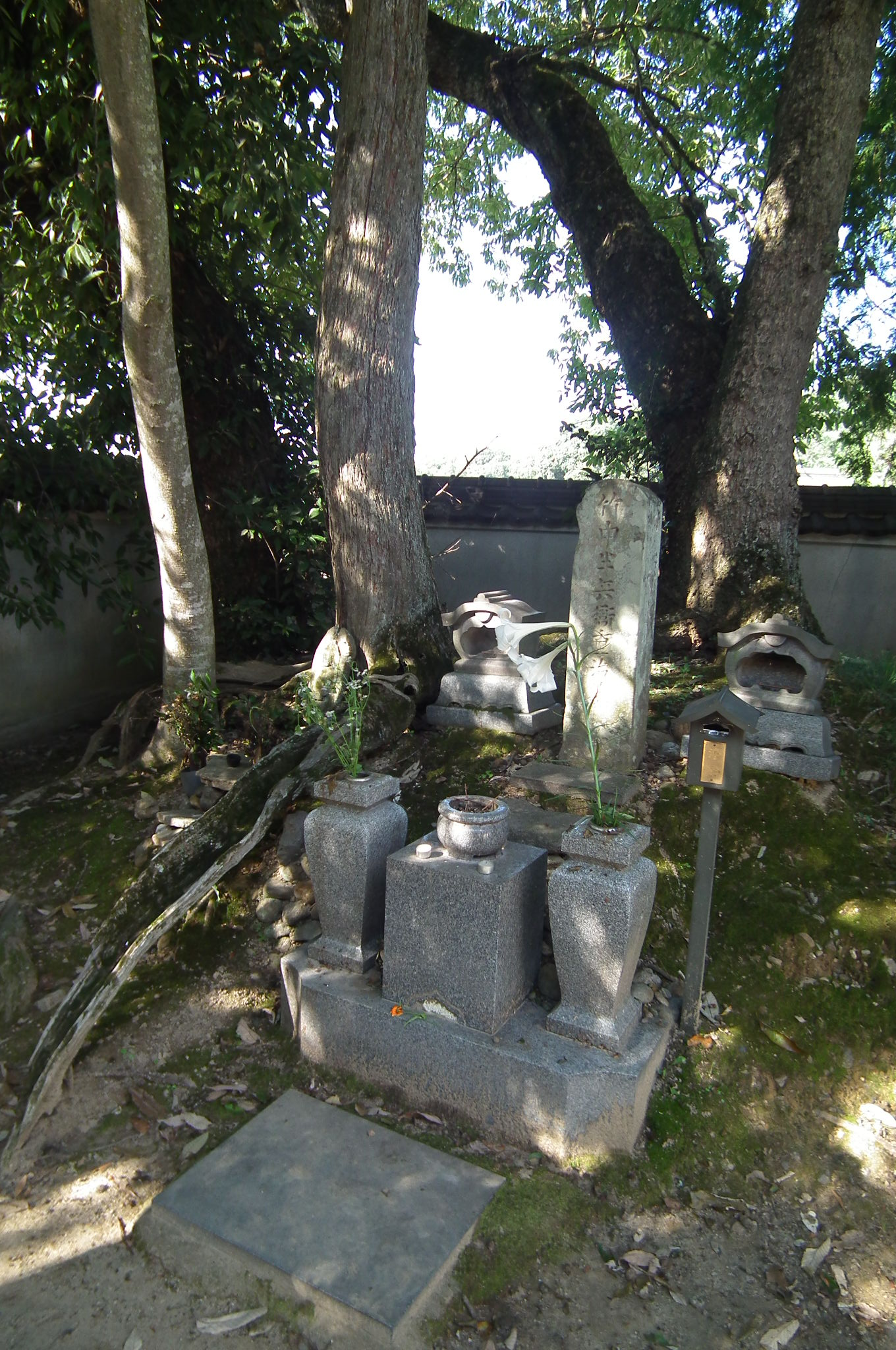
Grave of Takenaka Shigeharu

== Descendants ==
Takenaka Shigekado, Shigeharu's son and successor, continued to serve Hideyoshi after his father's death. At the Battle of Sekigahara, he fought on the side of Tokugawa Ieyasu, and his holdings at Bodaiyama Castle were secured. The Takenaka family thus became a family of hatamoto, and would soon move from their old castle of Bodaiyama Castle to the new castle called Takenaka Jinya(Takenaka clan's fortified residence). The holdings of the Takenaka included Sekigahara Village.

In the mid-19th century, Shigeharu's descendant Takenaka Shigekata served as commander of the Tokugawa forces in Fushimi at the Battle of Toba–Fushimi.

== Popular culture ==
- He is a playable character in Pokémon Conquest (Pokémon + Nobunaga's Ambition in Japan, with his partner Pokémon being Pikachu and Raichu.)
- He is also a playable character in Samurai Warriors 3, Samurai Warriors 4, Samurai Warriors 5, Warriors Orochi 3, and Warriors Orochi 4.
- A young female version of Takenaka Hanbei appears in the anime The Ambition of Oda Nobuna, which includes female versions of many Sengoku period figures.
- He appears in the Sengoku Basara anime series and game. His weapon of choice is a linked sword and darkness based attacks. In Anime, however, he contracted tuberculosis and dies after dueling with Kojuro Katakura.
- His nickname, Hanbei, is used in the video game Sekiro: Shadows Die Twice.
- Hanbei serves as an important ally to players in the 2020 video game Nioh 2. As with history, he dies mid-game from his illness during a siege. Despite this, he continues to guide the protagonist Hide from the afterlife.
