= Sōfuku-ji (Gifu) =

Buddhist temple in Gifu Prefecture, Japan

Coordinates: 35°26′36.41″N 136°46′2.67″E

Sōfuku-ji 崇福寺
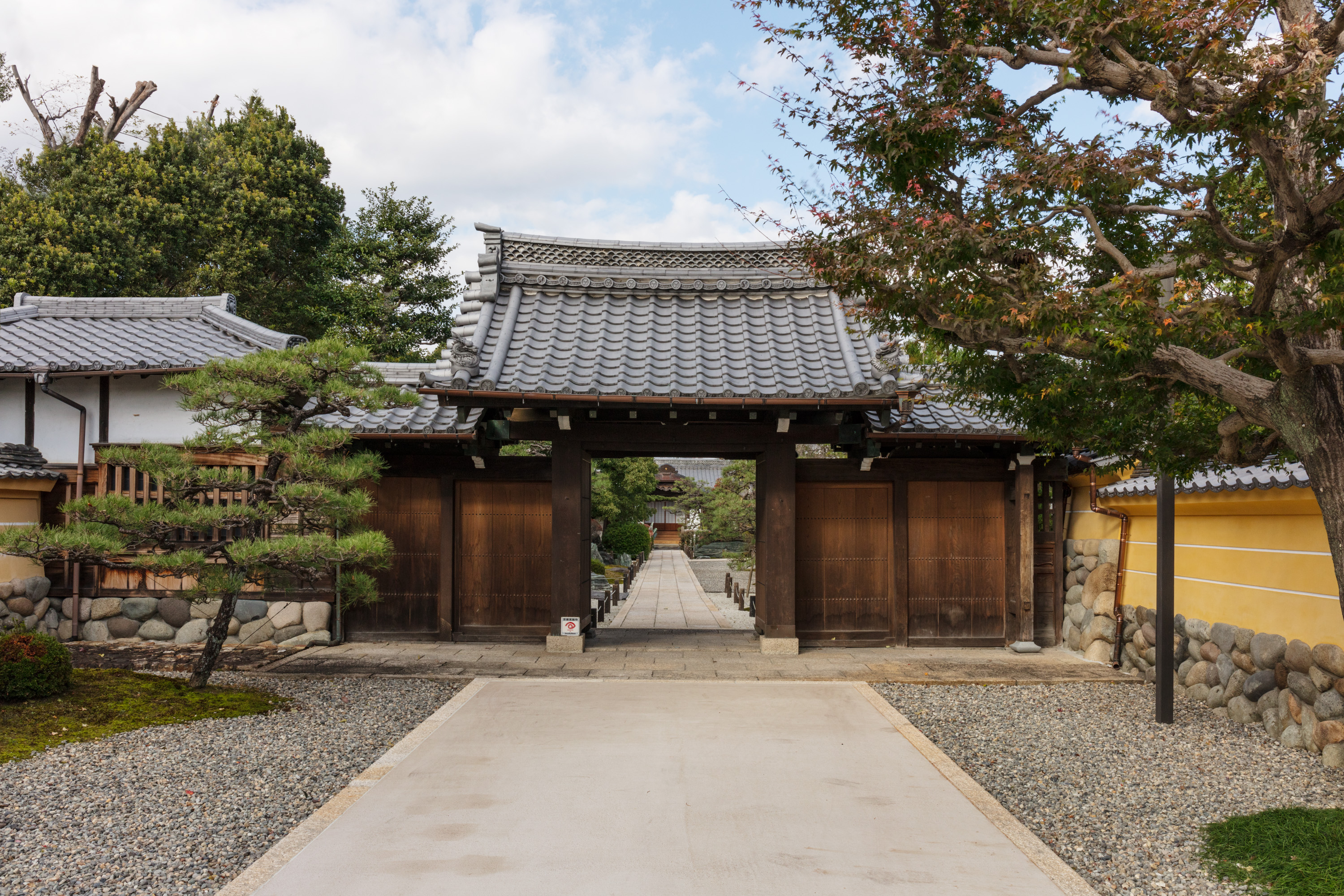
- Entrance to Sōfuku-ji

Religion
- Affiliation: Rinzai

Location
- Location: 2403-1 Nagara Fukumitsu; Gifu, Gifu Prefecture
- Country: Japan
- Interactive map of Sōfuku-ji 崇福寺

Architecture
- Founder: Ryōtan Sōei
- Completed: 1390

Website
- http://www.ccn.aitai.ne.jp/~soufuku/ Sōfuku-ji

Sōfuku-ji (崇福寺) is a Buddhist temple located in Gifu, Gifu Prefecture, Japan. The temple has strong ties to both Saitō Dōsan and Oda Nobunaga. Gifu's Sōfuku-ji is famed throughout Japan for both the number of monks it produces and for its "Blood Ceiling". Shortly after its founding, it was also known as Kōsai-ji (弘済寺), but that name is no longer used. It is also one of the Mino Thirty-three Kannon.

== History ==
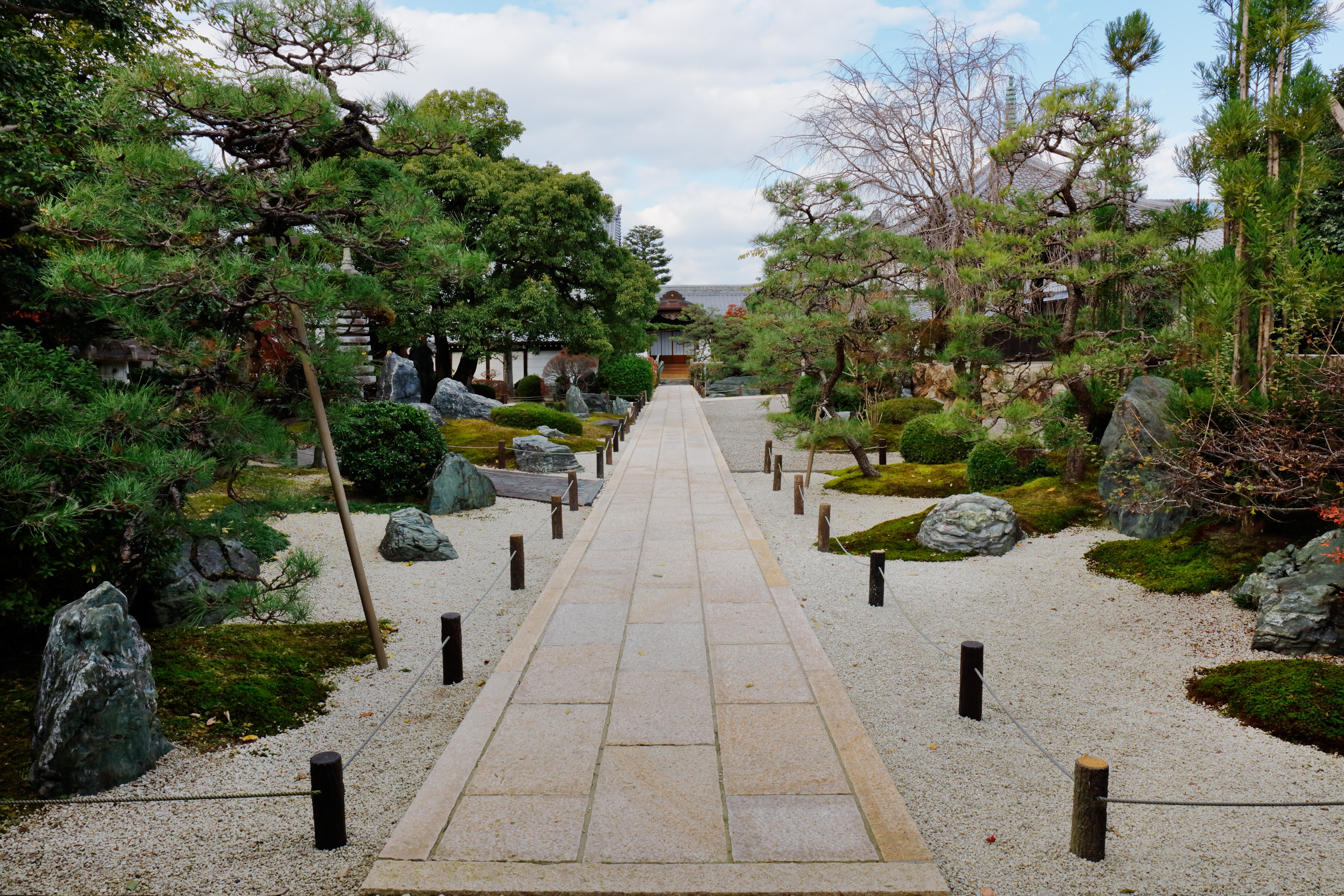
The inner path up to the temple

Sōfuku-ji was originally built during the Kamakura period. However, because it suffered from much deterioration, Saitō Toshimasa moved and rebuilt the temple in 1511. In 1517, he gave it its current name. According to other stories, though, it was originally built in 1469, by Toki Shigeyori and Saitō Nagahiro, and it was officially opened in 1493.

When Oda Nobunaga moved to Gifu in 1567, he made Sōfuku-ji the family temple of the Oda clan after mourning for Kitsuno, Nobunaga's concubine and the birth mother of his heir, Nobutada. After Nobunaga and Nobutada died during the Incident at Honnō-ji in 1582, Kyōun'in, Nobunaga's concubine and de facto legal wife at that time, decided that Sōfuku-ji would be their memorial site and built their mausoleum and tomb. She then placed ihai and belongings of them in the temple.

In 1600, when Oda Hidenobu was responding to Ishida Mitsunari's call for assistance, Fukushima Masanori and Ikeda Terumasa sieged the castle and destroyed it during the Battle of Gifu Castle. Hidenobu's vassals died during this siege and, after the destruction of the castle, the blood-stained floor of the castles main tower was used to create the new "Blood Ceiling" in the temple.

During the Edo period, the temple received much support from the government and, as a result, prospered. It also became a prayer place for the Arisugawa-no-miya. Also, Tokugawa Iemitsu supported this temple immensely because his wet nurse as a child, Lady Kasuga, who was the daughter of Saitō Toshimitsu, a relative of Dōsan.

== Images ==
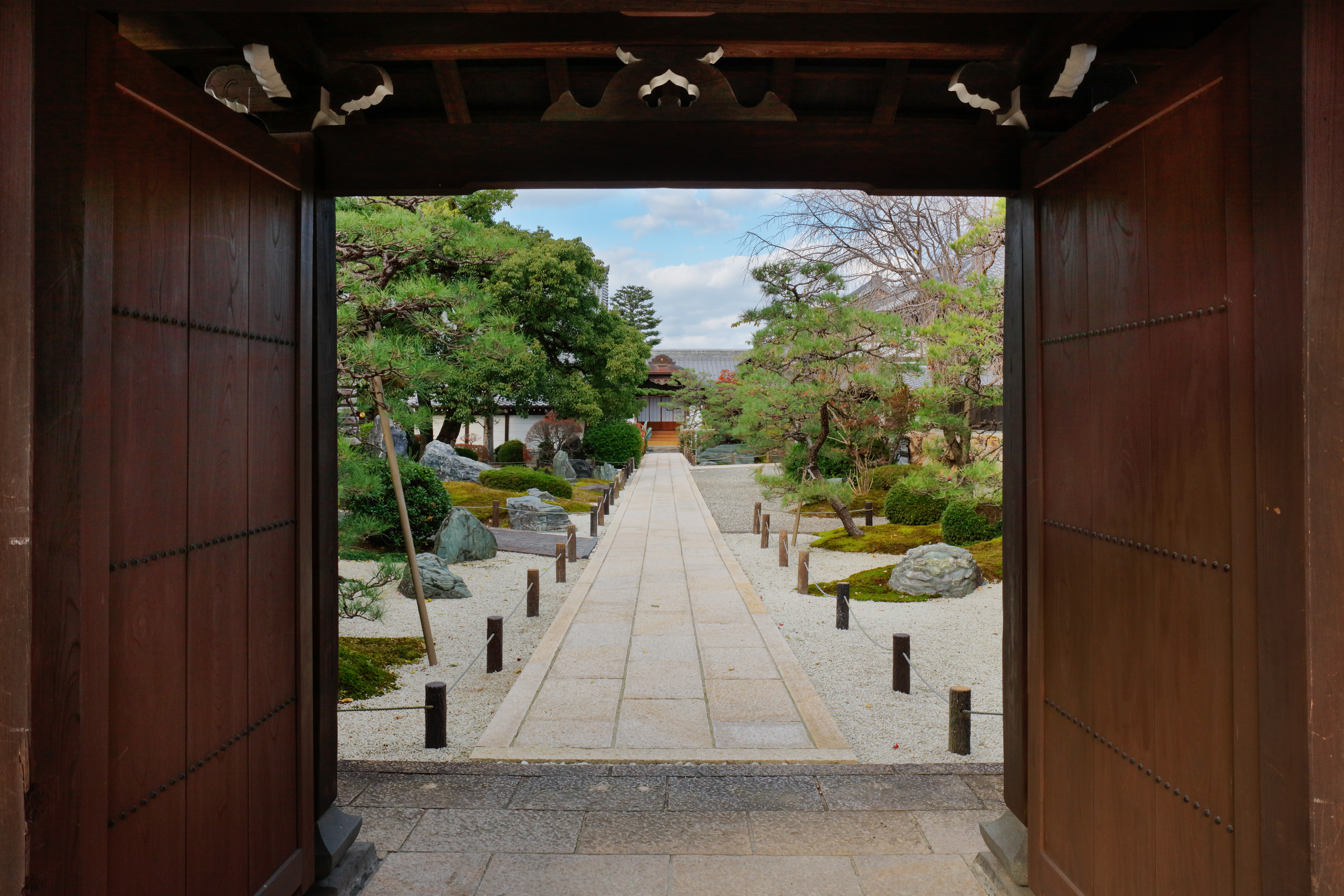

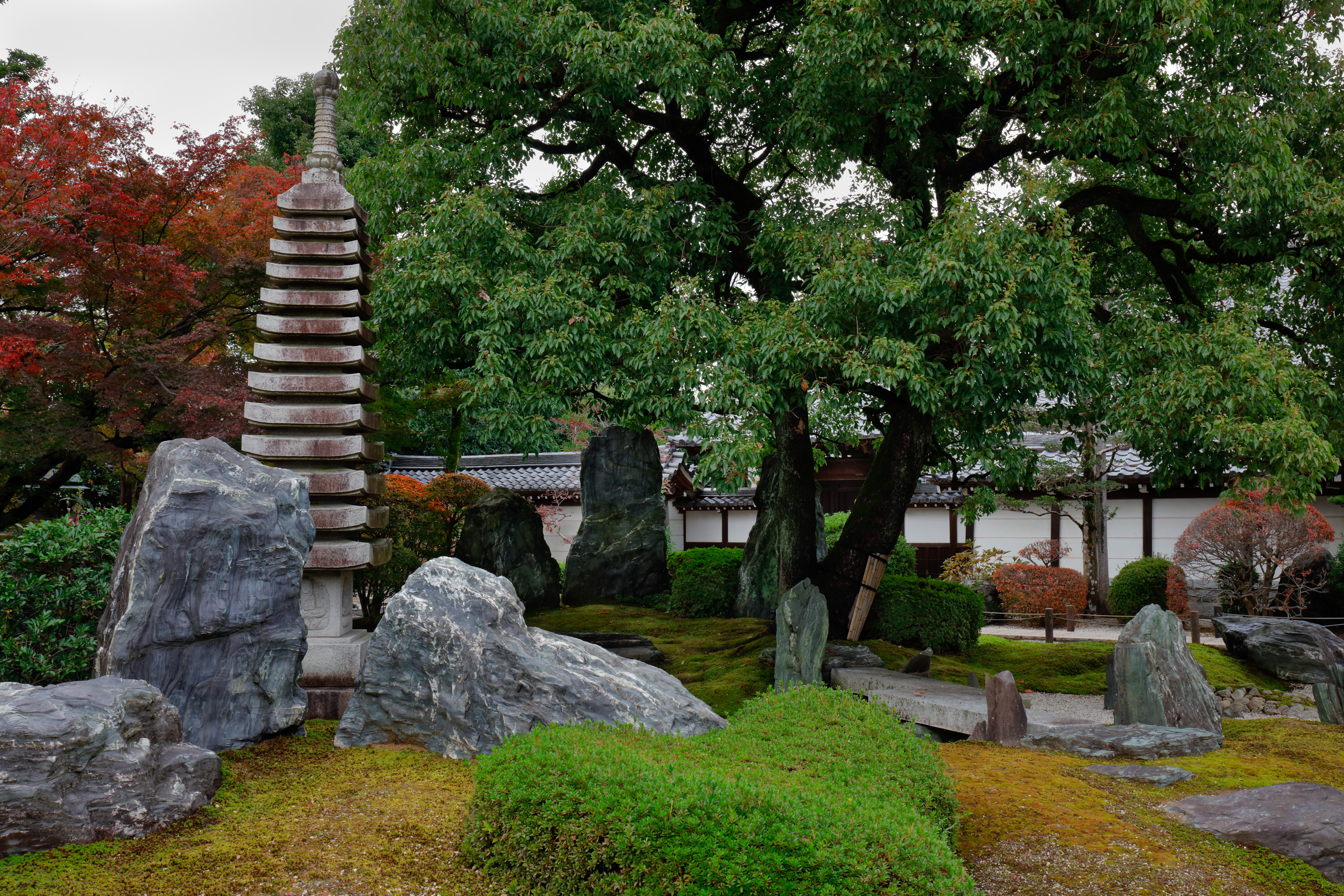

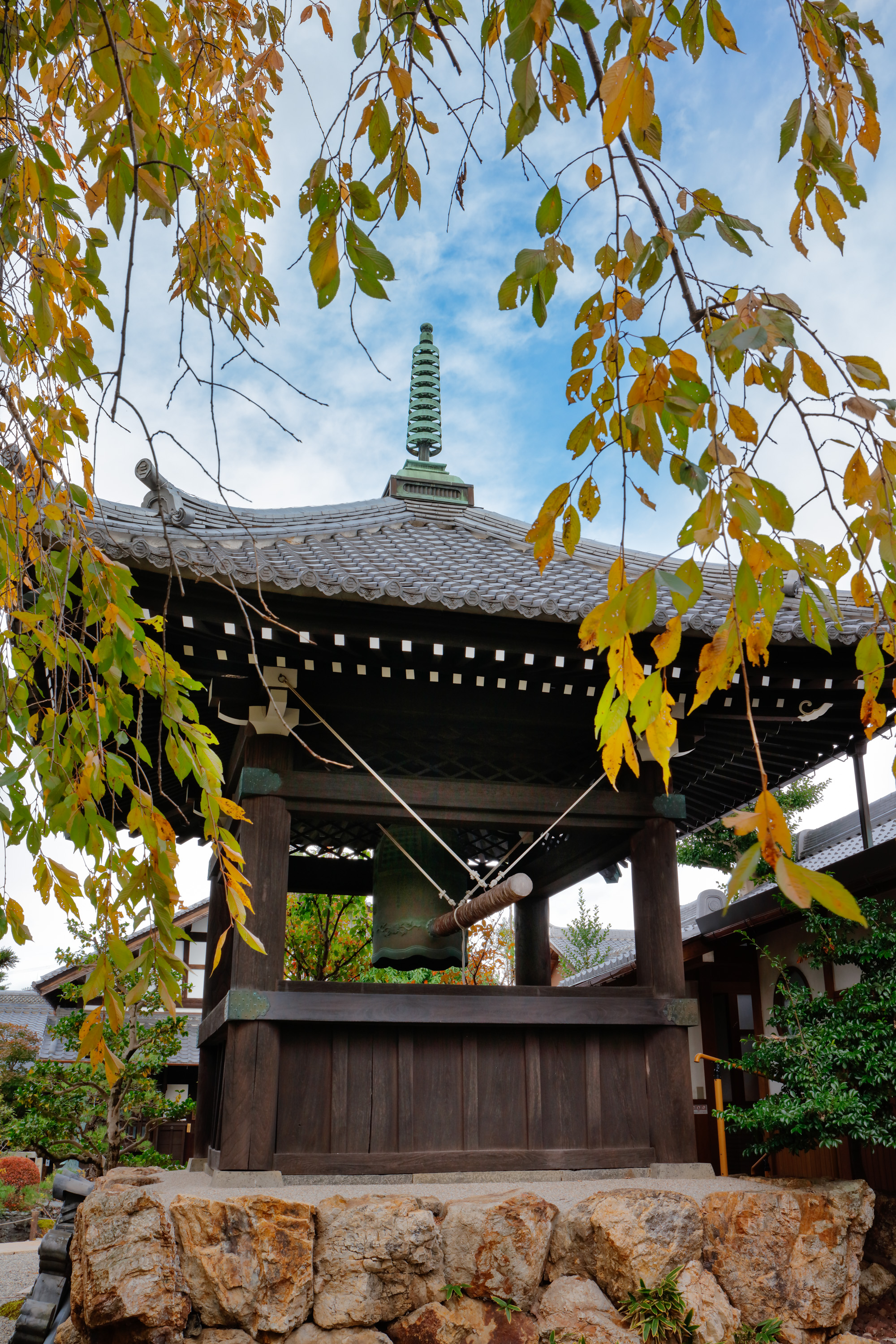

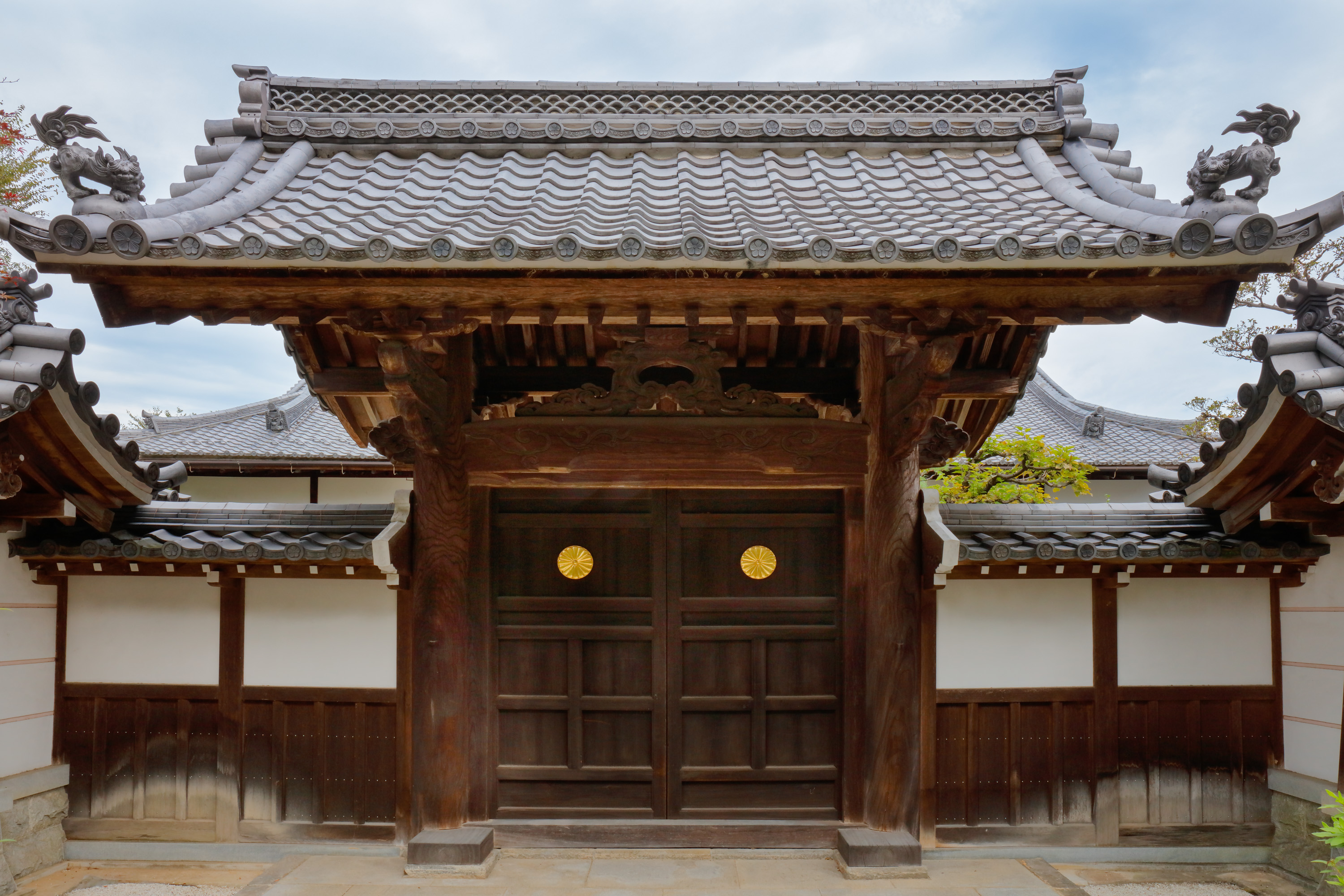

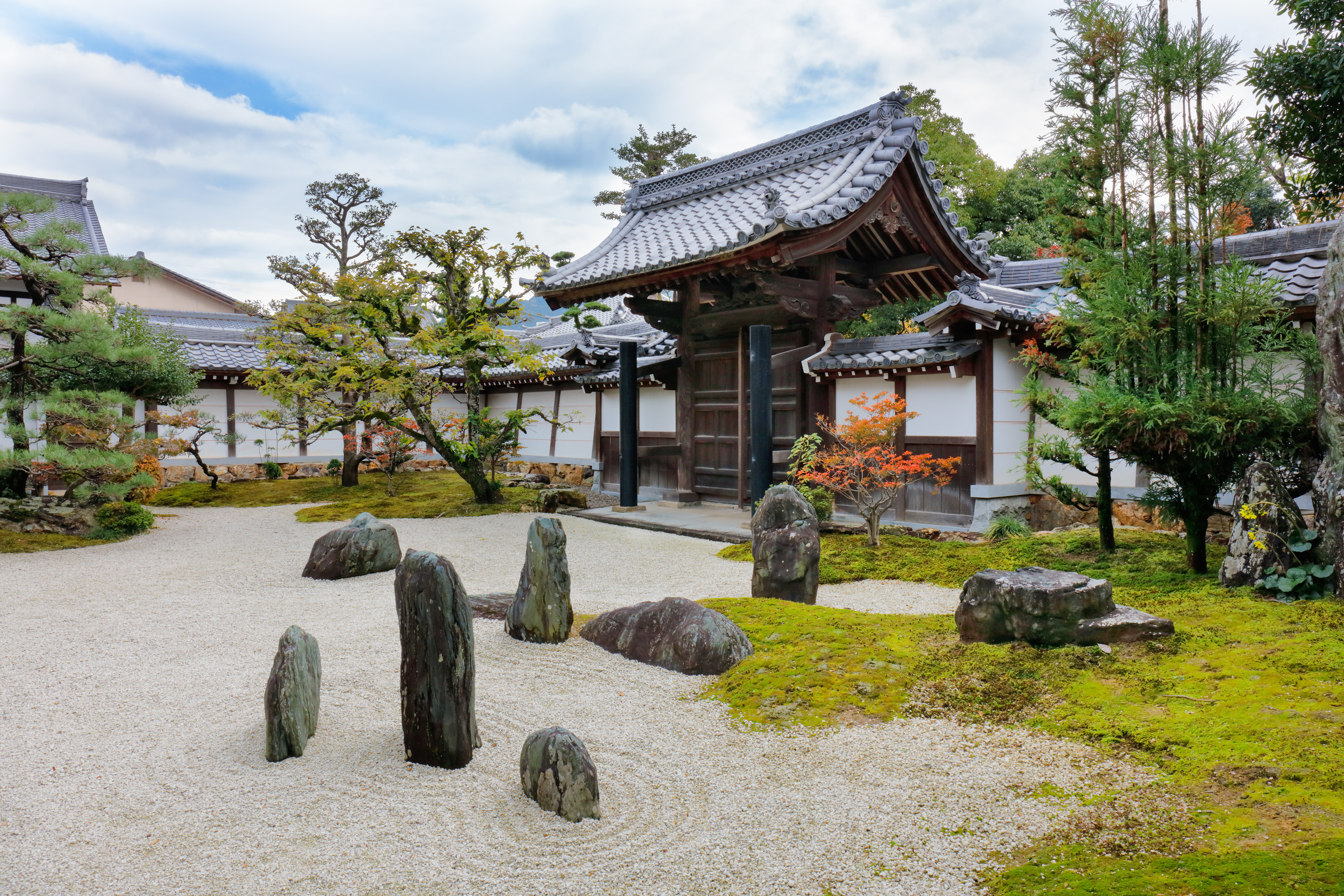

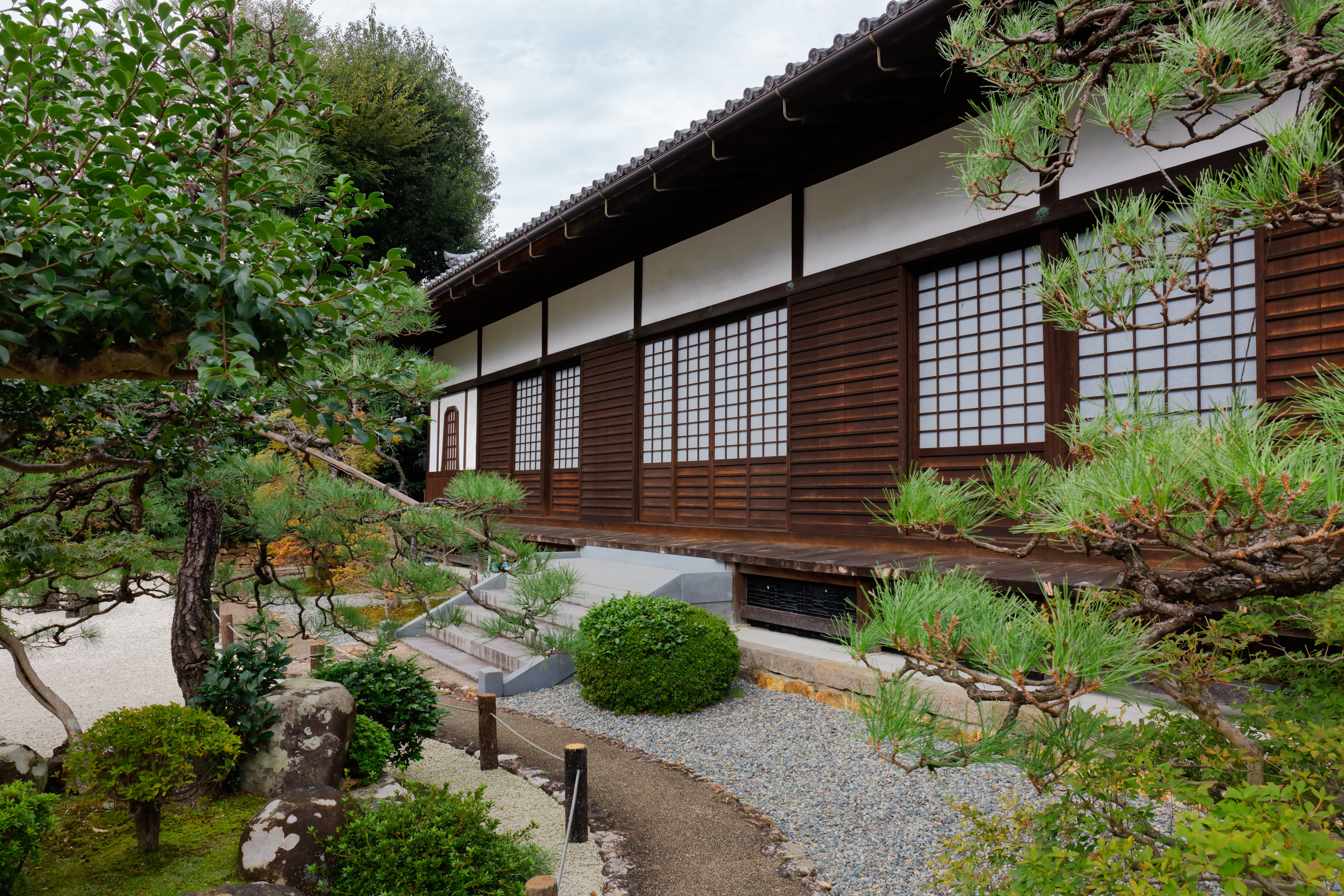

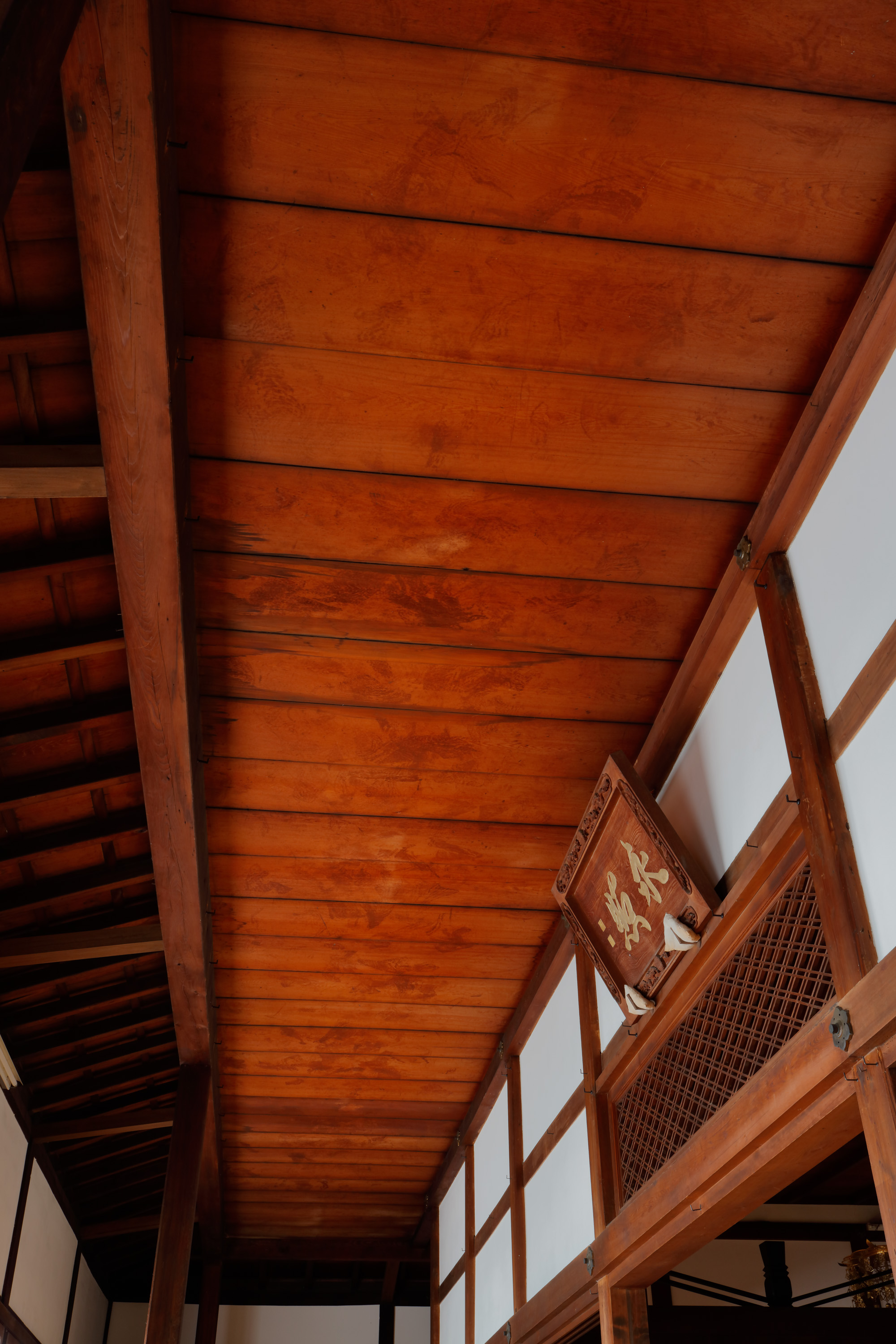

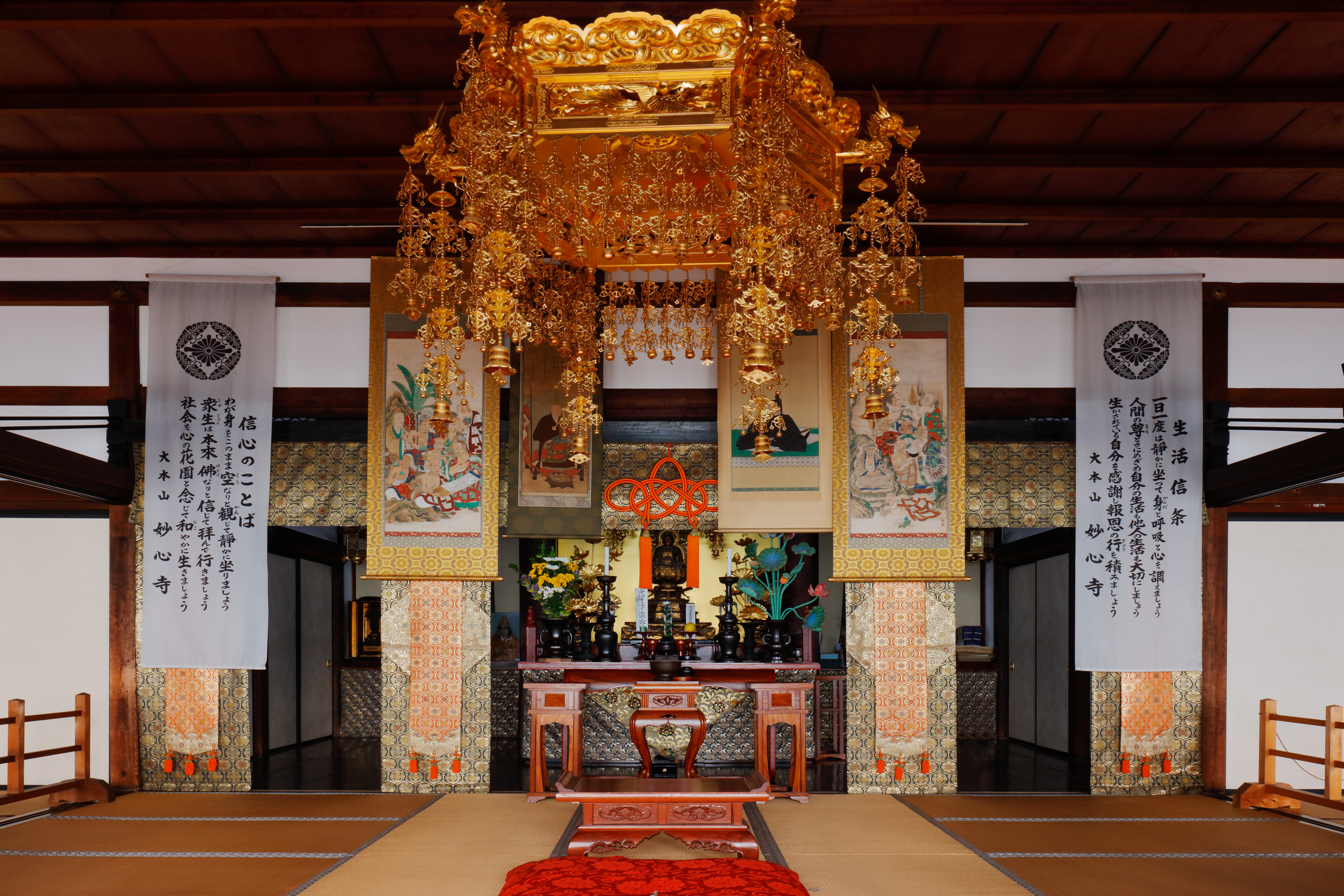

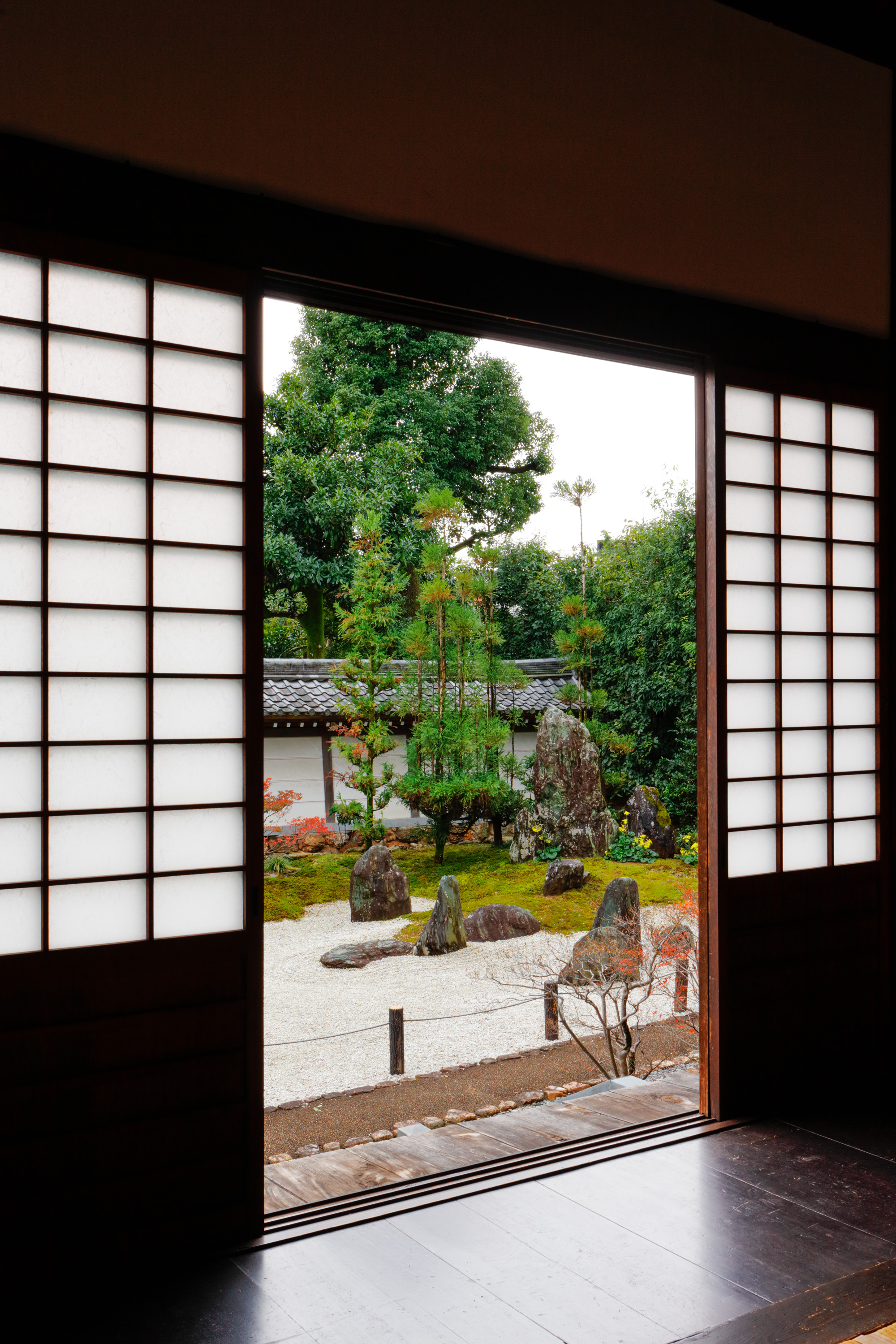

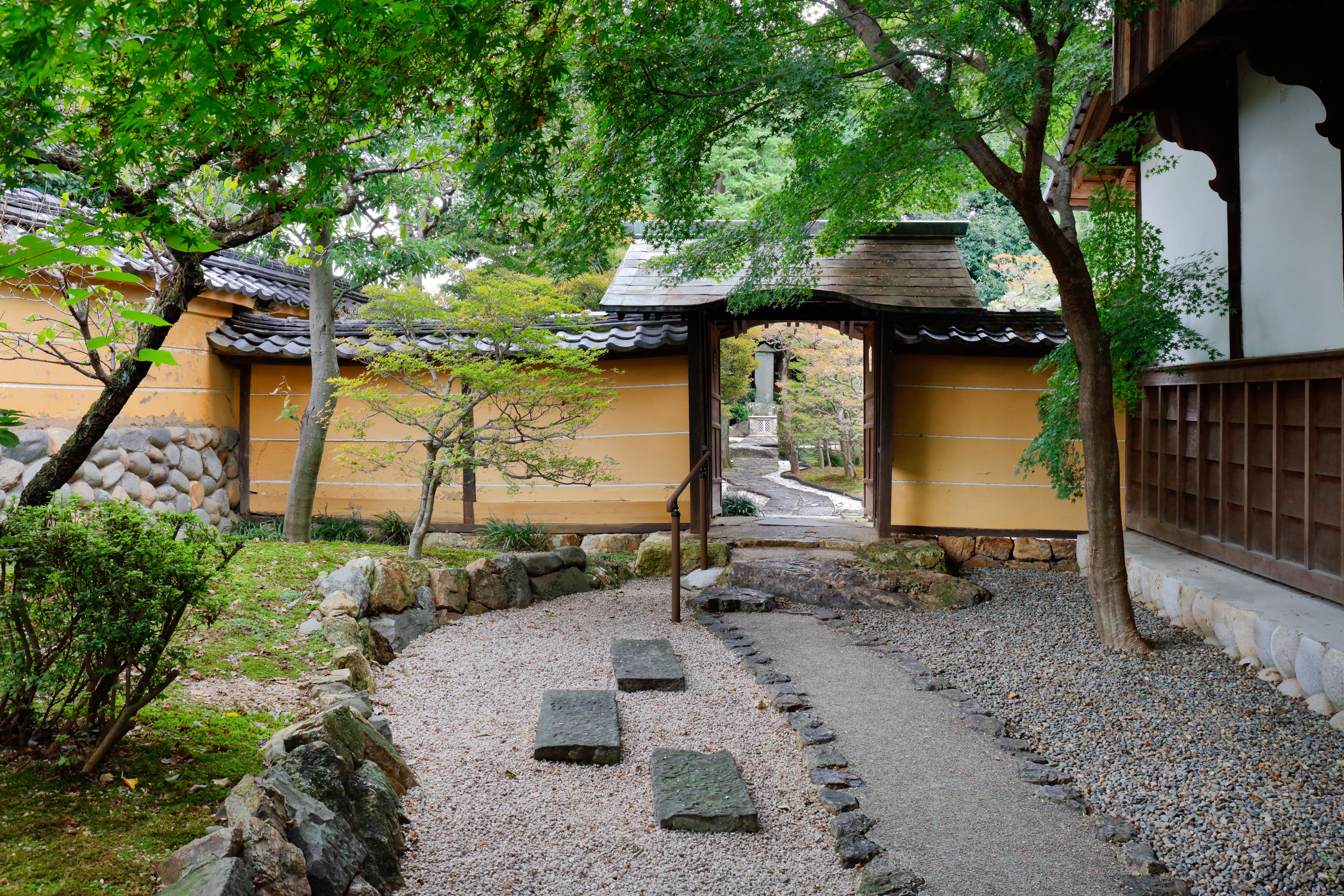

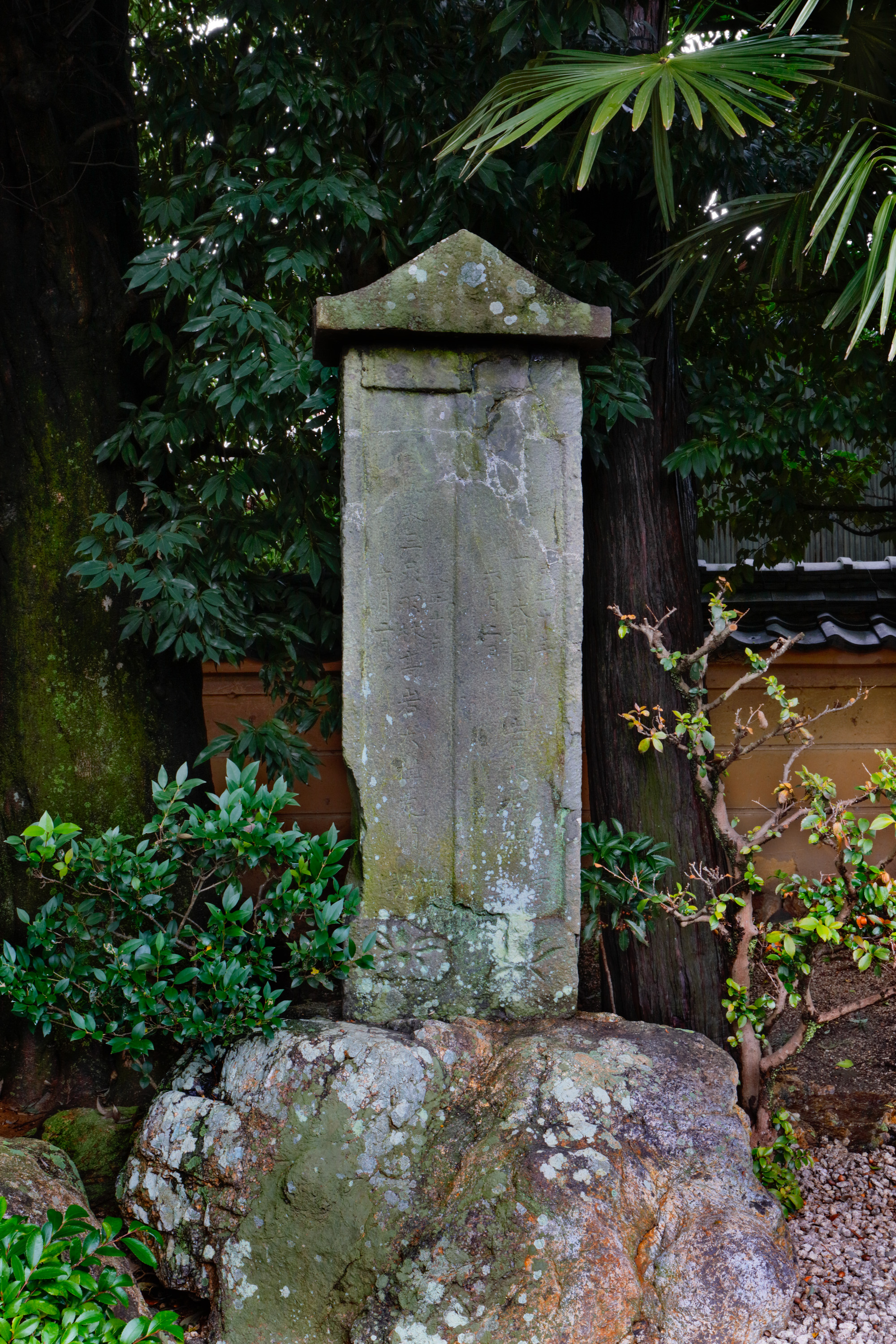

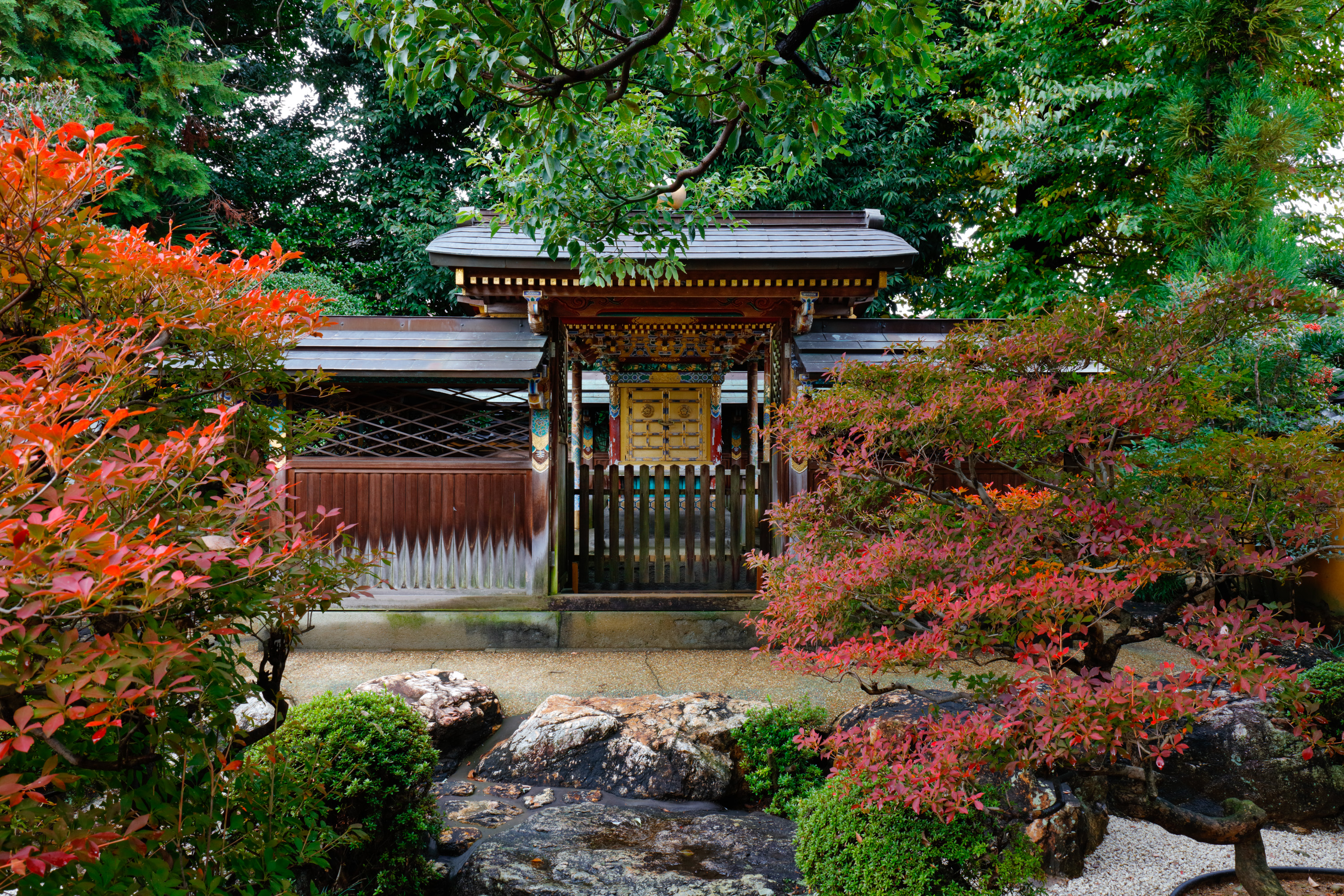

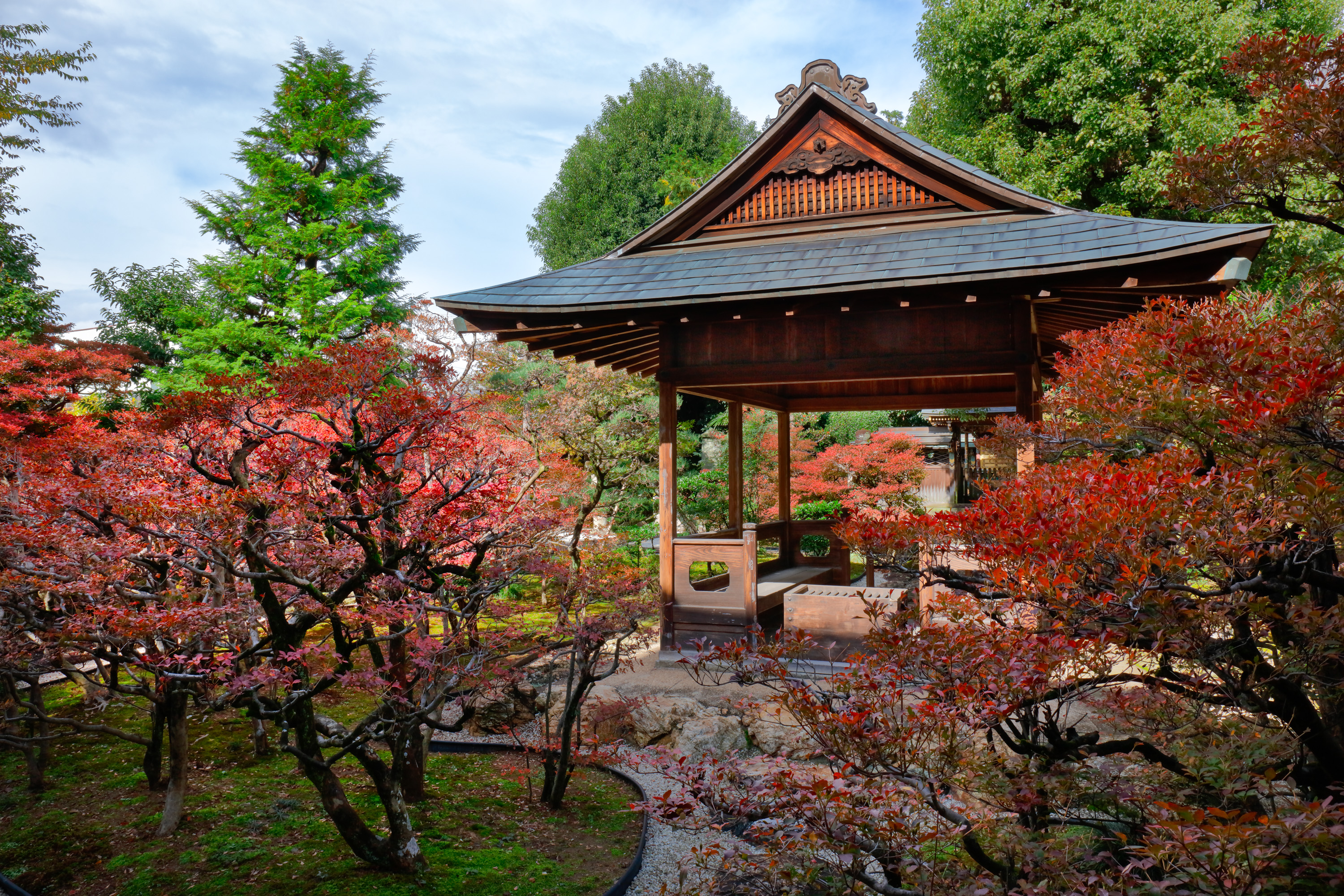

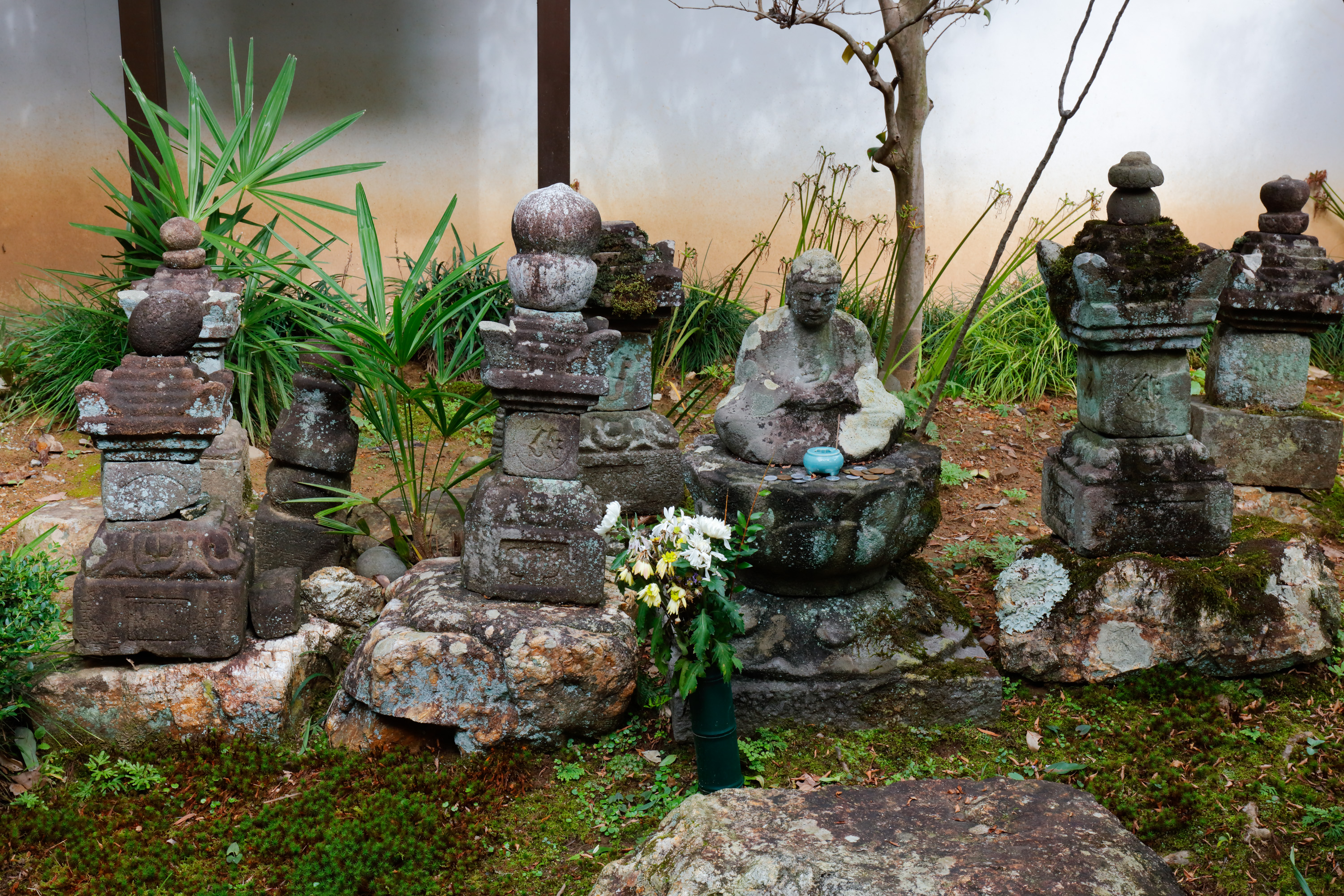
