= Battle of Gifu =

Battle of (the) Gifu can refer to:

- Battle of Gifu Castle in Japan in 1600
- Battle of Mount Austen, the Galloping Horse, and the Sea Horse in Guadalcanal in 1943, sometimes called the Battle of the Gifu
