= Omasa =

Japanese noblewoman and warrior

Omasa (於まさ, d. 1602) or Shōun-In (照雲院) was a Japanese woman from the Sengoku period. She was the first wife of Fukushima Masanori and daughter of Masanori's important retainer Tsuda Nagayoshi (津田長義). Omasa gave birth to Masanori's three sons. Her first son died as a baby for unknown reasons. Their second son survived but she died when giving birth to their third son due to birthing complications. Omasa was a naginata expert, she fought for herself several times and it was recorded that she participated in a military siege at Nagao castle.

== Tales ==
- Some tales have said that Omasa was a Christian and that's why when Toyotomi Hideyoshi was chasing Christians, unlike most daimyō's who persecute Christianity, Masanori helped cover the Christians in their fief.
- Omasa was said to be so beautiful and well-educated that Masanori cried and begged Hideyoshi to help him marry her. After their marriage Masanori once cried to Hideyoshi that he couldn't raise his head in front of her.
- The infamous tale was that she was always suspicious of him cheating on her so one evening when he came back partially drunk, she swung her naginata at him and he retreated. The joke later was that Masanori never once showed his back to his enemies in hundreds of battles, but in this one instance against his wife he retreated with his back exposed.
