= Oda Hidenobu =

Japanese samurai (1580 – 1605)

Senior Third Rank Oda Hidenobu
- 織田 秀信
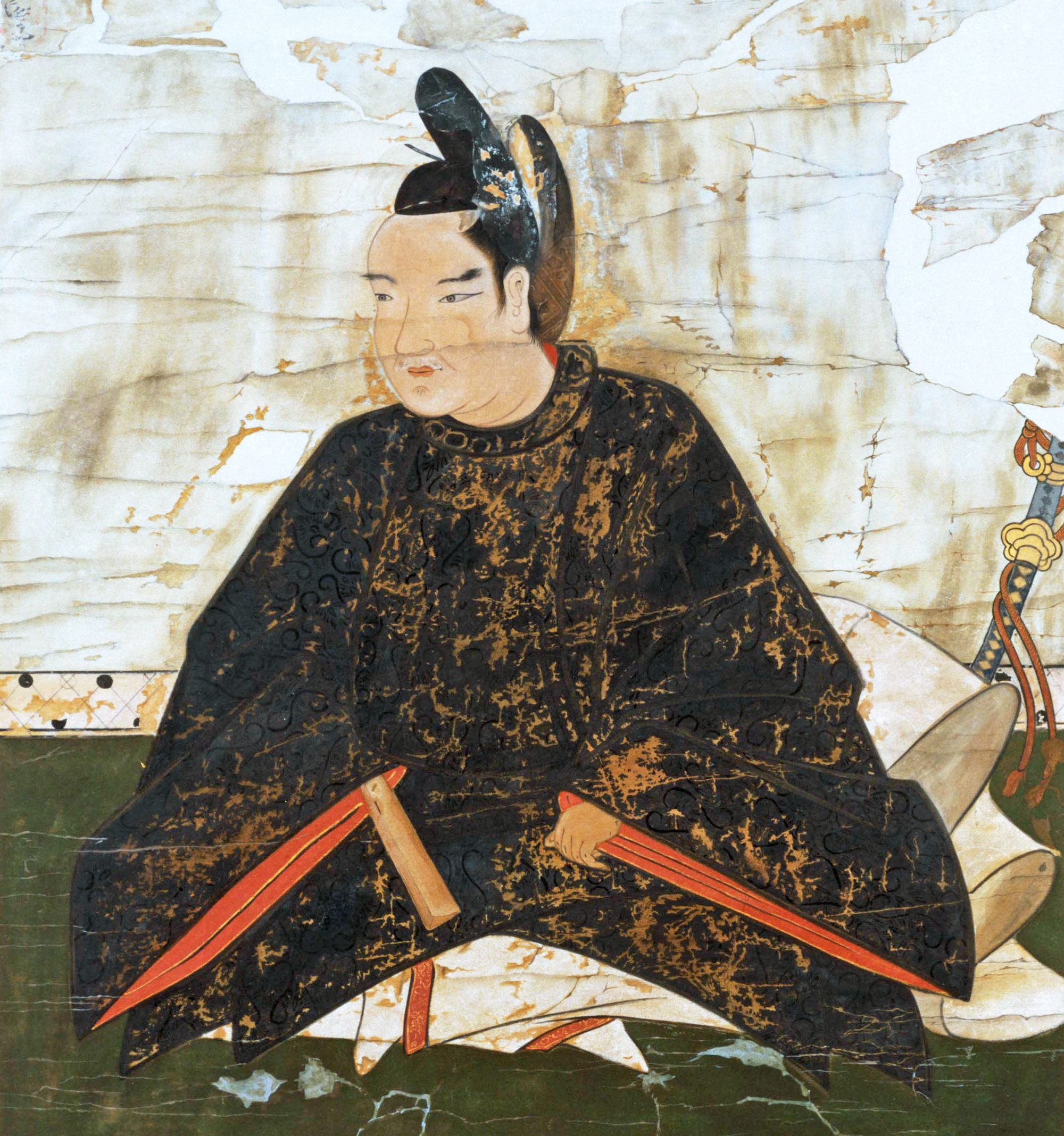

Head of Oda clan
- In office 1582–1605
- Preceded by: Oda Nobunaga
- Succeeded by: Oda Nobukatsu

Personal details
- Born: 1580 Mino Province
- Died: July 13, 1605 (aged 24–25) Mino Province
- Parents: Oda Nobutada (father); unknown (mother)
- Relatives: Oda Nobunaga (paternal grandfather)

Military service
- Allegiance: Toyotomi clan Western Army
- Unit: Oda clan
- Commands: Gifu castle
- Battles/wars: Battle of Gifu Castle (1600); Battle of Sekigahara (1600)

Oda Hidenobu (織田 秀信; 1580 – July 13, 1605), the son of Oda Nobutada, was a samurai who lived during the Azuchi-Momoyama period in the late-16th century. He was a convert to Catholicism. His childhood name was Sanbōshi (三法師).

== Succession dispute ==
When Oda Nobutada and Oda Nobunaga, Hidenobu's father and grandfather, respectively, were killed during the Incident at Honnō-ji in 1582, there was a dispute as to who would rule the Oda clan between Oda Nobutaka and Oda Nobukatsu, the third and second sons of Nobunaga respectively. Toyotomi Hideyoshi settled the dispute by supporting Hidenobu. Though Hidenobu was only an infant, he was declared the heir.

== Sekigahara campaign ==
Hidenobu followed in serving under Ishida Mitsunari during the Battle of Sekigahara in 1600. Before the battle, he had controlled Gifu Castle, an important element in Mitsunari's overall plans; however, he ended up losing the castle during the Battle of Gifu Castle against Ikeda Terumasa and Fukushima Masanori.

After losing at Sekigahara, Hidenobu's vassals committed seppuku in Gifu Castle. The blood-stained floorboards eventually became the ceiling in Sōfuku-ji in Gifu. The ceiling is now called the "blood ceiling" (血天井, chi tenjō). Hidenobu himself died five years after the defeat at Sekigahara.
