= Kyōun'in =

Concubine of Japanese daimyo Oda Nobunaga

Kyōun'in (興雲院; ? – 23 July 1612) (Note: Kyōun'in is a posthumous name.), also known as Onabe no Kata (お鍋の方) was a Japanese woman from the Sengoku period to the Azuchi–Momoyama period. She was a concubine of Oda Nobunaga, a Sengoku Daimyō of the Owari Province.

She is said to have been the fourth daughter of Takabata Genjūrō (or Shinjirō), local ruling family in Ōmi Province. According to common belief, she married Ogura Sanefusa (or Sanezumi or Kataharu), lord of Takano Castle in Ōmi Province, and had two sons, but after Sanefusa's death in battle, she became a concubine of Nobunaga. She was the birth mother of Nobunaga's seventh son Nobutaka, eighth son Nobuyoshi and sixth daughter Ofuri. She played the role of a substantial legal wife in Nobunaga's later years, and was treated courteously by Toyotomi Hideyoshi and Yodo-dono.

She had a deep knowledge of literature and had contacts with the kuge.

== Name ==
She is called Onabe no Kata because her signature on a letter left at Sōfuku-ji is Ogura Onahe (小倉おなへ) (Note: In the Japanese language of the time, be (べ) was also written as he (へ).).

== Life ==
In 1545, Onabe no Kata was born the daughter of Takabatake Genjūrō (or Shinjirō), a Gōzoku of Ōmi Province. The time is unknown, but before she became Oda Nobunaga's concubine, she married Ogura Sanefusa (or Sanezumi or Kataharu), a vassal of Rokkaku Yoshikata, and had sons with him, Jingorō and Matsuchiyo (or Matsuju). Sanefusa was a vassal of the Rokkaku clan, who was hostile to Nobunaga, but had been in contact with him for some time.

According to one account, Sanefusa helped Nobunaga when he was targeted by Saito Yoshitatsu's assassination squad in Kyoto, but the Ogura clan confronted the Rokkaku clan in 1564 and were defeated. Sanefusa was ordered to commit seppuku and died in 1565. Another theory is that Sanefusa assisted Nobunaga's escape from a predicament caused by his brother-in-law Azai Nagamasa's breaking of an alliance while attacking Asakura in 1570. However, his lord, the Rokkaku Clan, was hostile to the Oda clan and angered that he had sided with Nobunaga, they attacked the Ogura Clan. Sanefusa was defeated and committed suicide. Her two sons were taken as hostages by the Rokkaku clan. Having lost her husband and even her sons taken away, Onabe no Kata became half-crazy, according to documents from the time. In order to get her sons back at any cost, she consulted with the Ogura clan's vassals and wrote a letter to Nobunaga, asking him to rescue them. Perhaps feeling indebted to Sanefusa, Nobunaga immediately agreed to her request and got her two sons back. Besides, he accepted them as vassals of the Oda clan. Furthermore, he made Onabe no Kata live in Gifu Castle, and then made her his concubine. Onabe had two sons and a daughter with Nobunaga: Nobutaka, Nobuyoshi and Ofuri. After Nobunaga moved his base to Azuchi Castle, she supported him as de facto Midaidokoro and was in charge of the Oda family's domestic affairs. Nobunaga's vassals also paid respect to Onabe no Kata as a substantial legal wife.

In 1582, Nobunaga died a violent death at the Honnoji Incident. At this time, Matsuchiyo, the son of her ex-husband, was also killed. Gamō Katahide, who was the guardian of Azuchi Castle, and his son, Ujisato, had Nobunaga's wives and children evacuate Azuchi Castle to Hino Castle, Gamo's residence. Onabe no Kata immediately set out to secure Nobunaga's Buddhist mortuary chapel. First, she went to Gifu Castle, the residence of Nobunaga's heir, Nobutada, and organised the remaining belongings. She then designated Sōfuku-ji in Mino Province as Nobunaga's mortuary chapel and decided to build a mausoleum and graves. On that occasion, she sent a letter (Note: The letter, which appears to have been written at this time, is signed by Ogura Onahe, which, as mentioned above, is why she is known as Onabe no Kata.) in her own handwriting addressed to the temple, ordering the abbot to refuse any attempt to disturb the temple, no matter who it might be.

Hideyoshi Hashiba conducted Nobunaga's funeral at Daitoku-ji in Kyoto and built his tomb in its precincts. However, the tablets and belongings of Nobunaga and Nobutada were placed in Sōfuku-ji by Onabe no Kata. Later, when Hideyoshi became Nobunaga's successor, he protected Onabe no Kata by giving her 500 koku as a make-up fee (Note: Property given to women during their lifetime in medieval Japan.), and also gave her sons Nobutaka and Nobuyoshi a fief.

However, during the Battle of Sekigahara in 1600, Nobutaka and Nobuyoshi joined the Toyotomi side (Western Army) and were imposed sanctions after the war and their estates were confiscated, as was Onabe's make-up fee. Nobutaka also died of illness in 1602. Her distress was saved by Yodo-dono and One, both of whom had close ties to the Oda Clan. Toyotomi Hideyori (actually Yodo-dono) gave her 50 koku and One gave her 30 koku. With their support, she spent her last years in Kyoto until her death in 1612.

Onabe no Kata is laid to rest in the tomb of the Oda clan in Daitoku-ji Sōken-in.
