= Battle of Gifu Castle =

Part of the Sengoku period (1600)

Battle of Gifu Castle 岐阜城の戦い
- Part of the Sengoku period
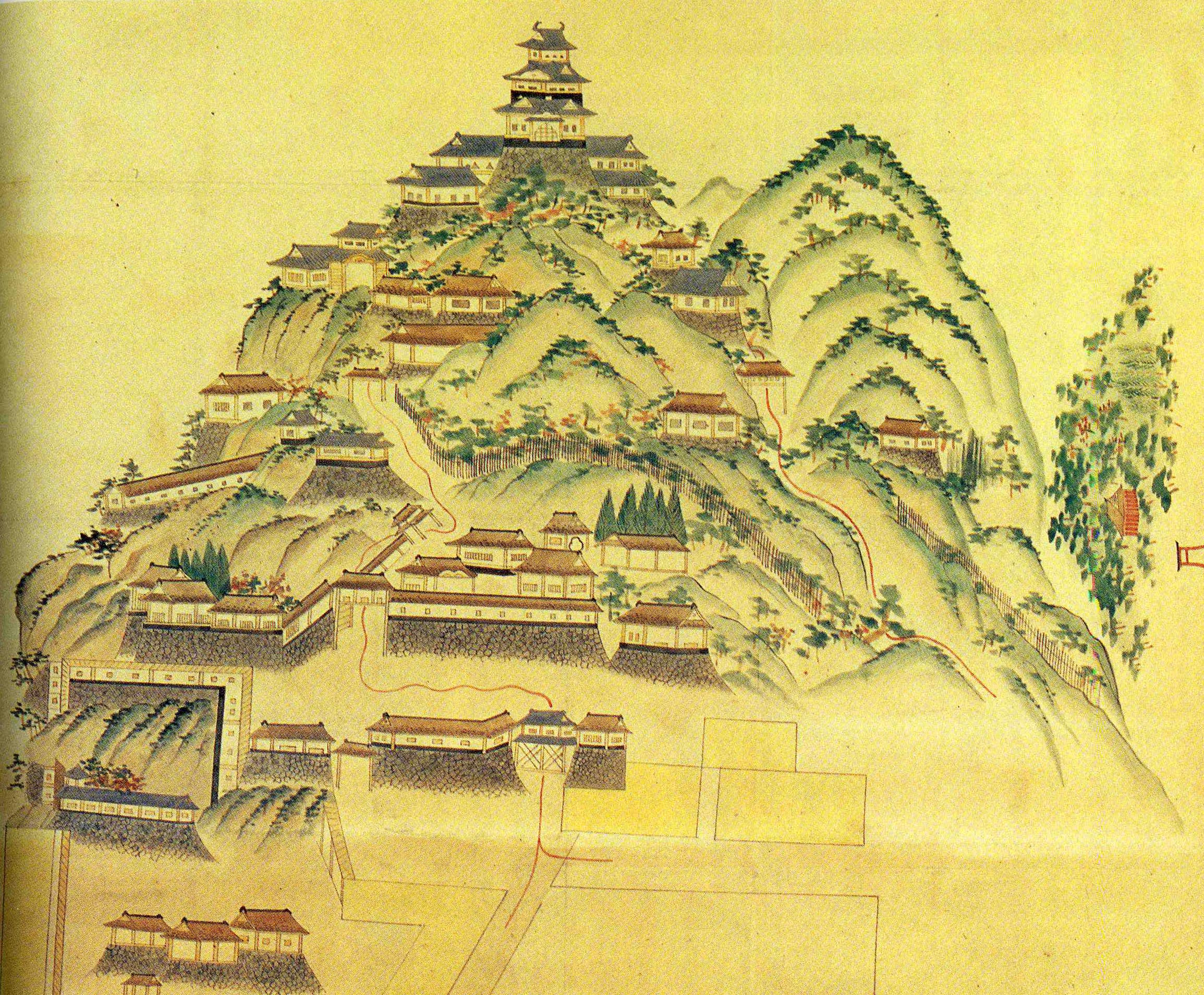
- View of Gifu Castle (painting from the Edo period)
Date	September 29–30, 1600
Location	Gifu, Mino Province 35°26′02″N 136°46′56″E
Result	Tokugawa victory
Territorial changes	Castle falls to Eastern army

Belligerents
Western Army: Forces loyal to Ishida Mitsunari	Eastern Army: Forces loyal to Tokugawa Ieyasu

Commanders and leaders
Oda Hidenobu; Oda Hidenori; Tsuda Tōsaburō; Kozukuri Tomoyasu; Dodo Tsunaie; Sugiura Shigekatsu; Mōri Hiromori; Mori Samon; Date Heiemon; Takenaka Sankuro; Saitō Tokugen	Ikeda Terumasa; Fukushima Masanori; Yamauchi Kazutoyo; Arima Toyōji; Togawa Tatsuyasu; Horio Tadauji; Tanaka Yoshimasa; Tōdō Takatora; Kuroda Nagamasa; Asano Yoshinaga; Ii Naomasa

Strength
6,000	35,000

Casualties and losses
Unclear	Unclear
- Location within Japan

The Battle of Gifu Castle (岐阜城の戦い, Gifu-jō no Tatakai) took place in September 1600 that led to the destruction of Gifu Castle in Gifu, Mino Province (modern-day Gifu Prefecture), Japan. The battle served as a prelude to the Battle of Sekigahara the following month. It pitted Oda Hidenobu of the Ishida Mitsunari western forces against Ikeda Terumasa, Ikeda Sen, and Fukushima Masanori of the eastern forces and loyal to Tokugawa Ieyasu. The castle was destroyed as a result of the battle.

== History of Castle ==
Gifu castle is located in Gifu Park in Gifu City, on the top of the 300m-high Mount Kinki and was formally known as Inabayama Castle. This castle was earlier built in the 13th century. During the years (1494–1556) of Saitō Dōsan, who was a ruthless adventurer, lived in the castle. Then, in the 1567, a warlord by the name Oda Nobunaga overtook the castle from the deceased Dōsan's grandson, Saito Tatsuoki. The Oda clan remained in the castle ever since until the battle in 1600.

== Prelude ==
As the eastern forces progressed up the Tōkaidō, Oda Hidenobu was not able to predict where the eastern forces would cross the Kiso River and continue their westward march. To defend against all possibilities, Hidenobu set up fortifications throughout the area, with Gifu Castle at the center, dividing his forces and weakening their total strength.

=== Terumasa's forces ===
Early in the morning of September 29, the combined eastern forces moved from Haguri District's Kōda (present-day city of Ichinomiya, Aichi Prefecture) in Owari Province to the neighboring Haguri District's Kōdajima (present-day city of Kakamigahara, Gifu Prefecture) in Mino Province. (The two Haguri Districts had previously been one district in Owari Province, hence their same names and proximity.) During their march, they crossed the Kiso River. While crossing the river, a contingent of Hidenobu's musketeers fought their advance in the Battle of Kōda Kisogawa Tokō (河田木曽川渡河の戦い Kōda Kisogawa Tokō no Tatakai) against Ikeda Terumasa's forces.

After defeating the musketeers, Terumasa's forces continued their march. On the afternoon of September 29, they arrived in the village of Komeno (present-day town of Kasamatsu) and fought a force of 3,000 men under Dodo Tsunaie (百々綱家) at the Battle of Komeno (米野の戦い Komeno no Tatakai) and defeated them.

At the time of the defeat, Hidenobu was in the nearby village of Injiki (present-day Ginan) and decided to remove his forces to Gifu Castle, instead of attacking the eastern forces where they were.

=== Masanori's forces ===
Around the same time, Masanori's forces tried to cross the Kiso River near Owari Province's Nakashima District (present-day Ichinomiya), but they found western forces deeply entrenched on the opposite banks and decided to head further south to cross the river. They eventually crossed at Higashikaganoi and traveled by Kaganoi Castle (加賀野井城 Kaganoi-jō) (in present-day Hashima, Gifu Prefecture) before they turned north and surrounded Takegahana Castle.

Sugiura Shigekatsu (杉浦重勝) initially resisted Masanori's forces, but Mōri Hiromori (毛利広盛), the leader of his supporting forces, capitulated to Masanori's, and Shigekatsu had no choice but to do the same and Takegahana Castle fell.

After the victories by Terumasa and Masanori, the two forces joined at the Arata River (荒田川, Arata-gawa) south of Gifu Castle to begin their final advance.

== Battle ==
On the evening of September 29, the combined eastern forces continued their pursuit of Hidenobu. To strengthen his own forces, Hidenobu sent out requests for help to nearby Ōgaki and Inuyama castles. While waiting for the forces to arrive, Hidenobu stayed in Gifu Castle thinking that they would be able to trap the opposing forces between his castle and the supporting forces from Ōgaki and Inuyama. The Toyotomi clan also sent some forces to Gifu Castle to help with the defense.

Even though Hidenobu thought that Gifu Castle could withstand any attack, he still put forces at mountain passes around the castle, protecting each route to it. Hidenobu and his brother Oda Hidenori (織田秀則) were put in charge of the men at Gifu Castle, with Tsuda Tōsaburō (津田藤三郎), Kozukuri Tomoyasu (木造具康), and Dodo Tsunaie in charge of the remaining men, again dividing and weakening Hidenobu's forces.

At dawn on September 30, the eastern forces received warning of the buildup of forces from Ōgaki and Inuyama castles. To prepare for battle by placing the forces of Yamauchi Kazutoyo, Arima Toyōji (有馬豊氏), Togawa Tatsuyasu (戸川達安), and Horio Tadauji in villages to the southeast of Gifu Castle and the forces of Tanaka Yoshimasa (田中吉政), Tōdō Takatora, and Kuroda Nagamasa to the southwest.

Later in the morning, Hidenobu forces began to move towards Zuiryū-ji, where they encountered Asano Yoshinaga and the fighting began. As Ii Naomasa fought through other mountains on the way to Gifu Castle, Masanori joined him and threw all of his forces into the battle, completely surrounding the castle.

During the battle, no supporting forces from Inuyama Castle arrived. The lord of the castle, Ishikawa Sadakiyo (石川貞清), remained in his castle with other leaders after he made an agreement with Naomasa not to join in the battle. Ōgaki Castle did send supporting forces; however, they were too late to help with the battle.

On September 30, all of Gifu Castle, other than the donjon, fell to the eastern forces. Hidenobu kept fighting until the end, but his army was reduced to just tens of men. Hidenobu was prepared to commit seppuku, but was persuaded by Ikeda Terumasa and others to surrender to the eastern forces. In the end, Gifu Castle fell in just one day.

== Aftermath ==
Hidenobu continued fighting in support of Hideyori; however, after Hideyori's forces lost the Battle of Sekigahara the following month, Hidenobu moved to Mount Kōya and became a monk. He died there five years later.

== See also ==
- List of Japanese battles
